= Outline of U.S. biological weapons =

The following outline is provided as an overview of and topical guide to United States biological weapons:

The United States had an offensive biological weapons program from 1943 until 1969. Today, the nation is a member of the Biological Weapons Convention and has renounced biological warfare.

== Agencies and organizations ==
=== Military and government agencies and schools ===
- United States Army Biological Warfare Laboratories (USBWL)
- United States Army Chemical Corps
- War Bureau of Consultants
- War Research Service

=== Biological weapons program locations ===
- United States biological weapons program

- Dugway Proving Ground

- Granite Peak Range

- Edgewood Arsenal
- Fort Detrick and the U.S. Army Biological Warfare Laboratories

- Building 470
- One-Million-Liter Test Sphere

- Fort Douglas, Utah

- Deseret Test Center

- Fort Terry/Plum Island Animal Disease Center

- Building 101
- Building 257

- Horn Island Testing Station
- Pine Bluff Arsenal
- Rocky Mountain Arsenal
- Vigo Ordnance Plant

== Treaties, laws and policies ==
- Biological Weapons Convention
- Geneva Protocol
- Statement on Chemical and Biological Defense Policies and Programs

== Weapons ==
=== Canceled weapons ===
- E77 balloon bomb
- E99 bomblet
- Flettner rotor, an experimental biological cluster bomb sub-munition
- Project St. Jo
- SPD Mk I, 4 lb. World War II-era biological bomb

=== Other weapons ===
- 20 mm particulate projectile
- E120 bomblet
- [50 lb. cluster bomb, held 544 bomblets
- E14 munition, sub-munition for E86 cluster bomb
- E23 munition, sub-munition for E77 cluster bomb
- E48 particulate bomb (E48R2), sub-munition for E96 cluster
- E61 bomb (E61R4)
- E86 cluster bomb
- E95 bomblet
- E96 cluster bomb
- M114 bomb, 4 lb. biological anti-personnel bomb, sub-munition for the M33 cluster bomb
- M115 bomb, a 500 lb. anti-crop bomb
- M143 bomblet
- M33 cluster bomb
- SUU-24/A dispenser

=== Weaponized biological agents ===
- anthrax, caused by Bacillus anthracis

- Ames strain

- tularemia, caused by Francisella tularensis
- brucellosis, caused by Brucella suis
- Q-fever, caused by Coxiella burnetii
- botulism
- Staphylococcal Enterotoxin B (SEB), toxin produced by Staphylococcus aureus, used as an incapacitating agent
- Stem rust, both wheat and rye stem rust, fungal anticrop agent
- Rice blast, fungal anticrop agent

=== Researched biological agents ===
- Argentinian hemorrhagic fever (AHF)
- Bird flu
- Bolivian hemorrhagic fever (BHF)
- Chikungunya virus (CHIKV)
- Dengue fever
- Eastern equine encephalitis (EEE)
- Hantavirus
- Lassa fever
- Late blight of potato
- glanders
- melioidosis
- Newcastle disease
- Plague
- Psittacosis
- Smallpox
- Ricin (technically a chemical weapon)
- Rift Valley fever (RVF)
- Rinderpest
- Typhus
- Western equine encephalitis (WEE)
- Yellow fever

== Operations and exercises ==
- Edgewood Arsenal experiments
- Operation Big Buzz
- Operation Big Itch
- Operation Blue Skies
- Operation Dark Winter
- Operation Dew
- Operation Drop Kick
- Operation LAC
- Operation Magic Sword
- Operation May Day
- Operation Polka Dot
- Operation Top Off
- Operation Whitecoat
- Project 112
- Project Bacchus
- Project Clear Vision
- Project Jefferson

== Biological attacks ==
- 1984 Rajneeshee bioterror attack
- 1989 California medfly attack
- 2001 anthrax attacks
- 2003 ricin letters

== See also ==
- Outline of U.S. chemical weapons
- United States and weapons of mass destruction
