= History of biological warfare =

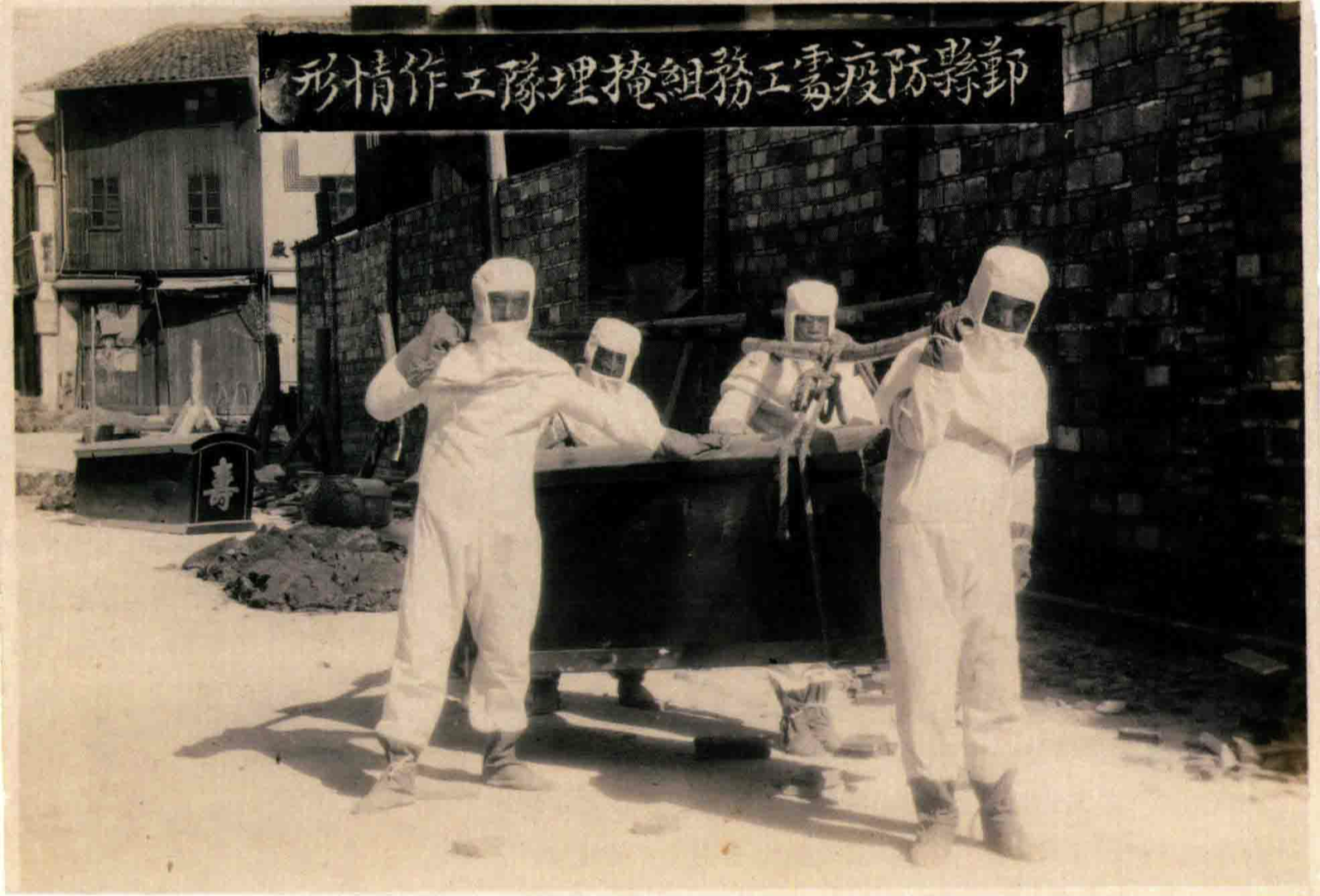
Chinese workers wearing hazmat suits bury a victim of the Ningbo plague attack, 1940. The Empire of Japan's Unit 731 led this biological warfare in the Second Sino-Japanese War.

The modern concept of biological warfare involves the use of biological agents, of which there are pathogens, typically bacteria or viruses, and toxins, which are biologically produced poisons. The history of biological warfare begins in antiquity but was transformed in the 20th century via industrial warfare and advances in microbiology such as genetic engineering.

In the ancient and medieval period, biological warfare commonly overlapped with chemical warfare. This included contamination of food, water, animals, weapons systems, fabrics. In the European Middle Ages, common weapons were poisoned arrows and catapults to launch cadavers or animal corpses. European colonization exposed native populations in the Americas and Australia to smallpox outbreaks, although evidence of successful intentional uses is limited.

In World War I, the German Empire targeted horses and livestock with anthrax and glanders while France used burkholderia. The use of biological weapons in international warfare was theoretically prohibited by the 1925 Geneva Protocol, but research continued, and Japan and the United States did not ratify it until the 1970s. During World War II, many countries initiated large biological weapons programs as part of total war. The Empire of Japan became the first country to use enhanced pathogens. Its Unit 731 and other units, led by Shirō Ishii, dispersed pathogens throughout China during the Second Sino-Japanese War. Plague, cholera, typhoid, anthrax, glanders, and others were used, primarily from air-dropped bomblets filled with infected fleas, a form of entomological warfare. Research was furthered by forced human experimentation on civilians and prisoners of war. The United Kingdom, at Porton Down, and the United States developed advanced biological programs including anthrax bombs.

After the war, an American cover-up gave immunity to biological warfare leaders, from prosecution for Japanese war crimes, in exchange for information to further the United States biological weapons program. Scrutiny during the Vietnam War forced the United States to renounce biological weapons in 1969. This contributed to the 1972 Biological and Toxin Weapons Convention, which comprehensively prohibited their development, production, stockpiling, and use. However, due to its weak inspection measures stemming from the Cold War, an advanced Soviet biological weapons program flourished. Genetic engineering was used to enhance pathogens' climate and antimicrobial resistance. Stockpiled weapons were envisioned for intercontinental attacks against cities, battlefield employment, and anti-agriculture attacks. The 1979 Sverdlovsk anthrax leak, which killed at least 68 people, was the first indication to the world of a continued offensive program.

Ba'athist Iraq also developed a biological weapons program, weaponizing anthrax and toxins, before its disarmament post-Gulf War by the United Nations Special Commission. The unsolved 2001 anthrax attacks in the United States, a week after the September 11 attacks, heightened public fear of biological warfare as a weapon of mass destruction. False allegations by a US-led coalition that Iraq was maintaining its weapons of mass destruction programs played a major role in justifying the 2003 invasion of Iraq.

== Antiquity ==
The earliest documented incident of the intention to use biological weapons is possibly recorded in Hittite texts of 1500–1200 BC, in which victims of tularemia were driven into enemy lands, causing an epidemic. Although the Assyrians knew of ergot, a parasitic fungus of rye which produces ergotism when ingested, there is no evidence that they poisoned enemy wells with the fungus, as has been claimed.

According to Homer's epic poems about the legendary Trojan War, the Iliad and the Odyssey, spears and arrows were tipped with poison. During the First Sacred War in Greece, in about 590 BC, Athens and the Amphictionic League poisoned the water supply of the besieged town of Kirrha (near Delphi) with the toxic plant hellebore. According to Herodotus, during the 4th century BC Scythian archers dipped their arrow tips into decomposing cadavers of humans and snakes or in blood mixed with manure, supposedly making them contaminated with dangerous bacterial agents like Clostridium perfringens and Clostridium tetani, and snake venom.

In a naval battle against King Eumenes of Pergamon in 184 BC, Hannibal of Carthage had clay pots filled with venomous snakes and instructed his sailors to throw them onto the decks of enemy ships. The Roman commander Manius Aquillius poisoned the wells of besieged enemy cities in about 130 BC. In about AD 198, the Parthian city of Hatra (near Mosul, Iraq) repulsed the Roman army led by Septimius Severus by hurling clay pots filled with live scorpions at them. Like Scythian archers, Roman soldiers dipped their swords into excrements and cadavers too — victims were commonly infected by tetanus as result.

The use of bees as guided biological weapons was described in Byzantine written sources, such as Tactica of Emperor Leo VI the Wise in the chapter On Naval Warfare.

There are numerous other instances of the use of plant toxins, venoms, and other poisonous substances to create biological weapons in antiquity.

== Post-classical ages ==
The Mongol Empire established commercial and political connections between the Eastern and Western areas of the world, through the most mobile army ever seen. The armies, composed of the most rapidly moving travelers who had ever moved between the steppes of East Asia (where bubonic plague was and remains endemic among small rodents), managed to keep the chain of infection without a break until they reached, and infected, peoples and rodents who had never encountered it. The Black Death of the following century, caused by Yersinia pestis strains perhaps spread by Mongol movements, may have killed up to 50 million total — roughly a third of the population of Europe, with unknown casualty counts in the Middle East and North Africa, changing the course of Asian and European history.

Biologicals were extensively used in many parts of Africa from the sixteenth century AD, most of the time in the form of poisoned arrows, or powder spread on the war front as well as poisoning of horses and water supply of the enemy forces. In Borgu, there were specific mixtures to kill, hypnotize, make the enemy bold, and to act as an antidote against the poison of the enemy as well. The creation of biologicals was reserved for a specific and professional class of medicine men. In South Sudan, the people of the Koalit Hills kept their country free of Arab invasions by using tsetse flies as a weapon of war. Several accounts can give an idea of the efficiency of the biologicals. For example, Mockley-Ferryman in 1892 commented on the Dahomean invasion of Borgu, stating that "their (Borgawa) poisoned arrows enabled them to hold their own with the forces of Dahomey notwithstanding the latter's muskets." The same scenario happened to Portuguese raiders in Senegambia when they were defeated by Mali's Gambian forces, and to John Hawkins in Sierra Leone where he lost a number of his men to poisoned arrows.

During the Middle Ages, victims of the bubonic plague were used for biological attacks, often by flinging fomites such as infected corpses and excrement over castle walls using catapults. Bodies would be tied along with cannonballs and shot towards the city area. In 1346, during the siege of Caffa (now Feodossia, Crimea) the attacking Tartar Forces (subjugated by the Mongol Empire under Genghis Khan more than a century earlier), used the bodies of Mongol warriors of the Golden Horde who had died of plague, as weapons. It has been speculated that this operation may have been responsible for the advent of the Black Death in Europe. At the time, the attackers thought that the stench was enough to kill them, though it was the disease that was deadly. (However, in recent years, some scholarship and research has cast doubt on the use of trebuchets to hurl corpses due to factors such as the size of trebuchets and how close they would have to be constructed due to the hilly landscape in Caffa.)

At the siege of Thun-l'Évêque in 1340, during the Hundred Years' War, the attackers catapulted decomposing animals into the besieged area.

In 1422, during the siege of Karlstein Castle in Bohemia, Hussite attackers used catapults to throw dead (but not plague-infected) bodies and 2,000 carriage-loads of dung over the walls.

English Longbowmen usually did not draw their arrows from a quiver; rather, they stuck their arrows into the ground in front of them. This allowed them to nock the arrows faster and the dirt and soil was likely to stick to the arrowheads, thus making the wounds much more likely to become infected.

== 17th and 18th century ==
=== Europe ===
The last known incident of using plague corpses for biological warfare may have occurred in 1710, when Russian forces attacked Swedish troops by flinging plague-infected corpses over the city walls of Reval (Tallinn) (although this is disputed). However, during the 1785 siege of La Calle, Tunisian forces flung diseased clothing into the city.

=== North America ===
During Pontiac's Rebellion, in June 1763 a group of Native Americans laid siege to British-held Fort Pitt. During a parley in the middle of the siege on June 24, Captain Simeon Ecuyer gave representatives of the besieging Delawares, including Turtleheart, two blankets and a handkerchief enclosed in small metal boxes that had been exposed to smallpox, in an attempt to spread the disease to the besieging Native warriors in order to end the siege. William Trent, the trader turned militia commander who had come up with the plan, sent an invoice to the British colonial authorities in North America indicating that the purpose of giving the blankets was "to Convey the Smallpox to the Indians." The invoice was approved by General Thomas Gage, then serving as Commander-in-Chief, North America. A reported outbreak that began the spring before left as many as one hundred Native Americans dead in Ohio Country from 1763 to 1764. It is not clear whether the smallpox was a result of the Fort Pitt incident or whether the virus was already present among the Delaware people, as outbreaks happened on their own every dozen or so years and the delegates were met again later and seemingly had not contracted smallpox. Trade and combat also provided ample opportunity for transmission of the disease.

A month later, Colonel Henry Bouquet, who was leading a relief attempt towards Fort Pitt, wrote to his superior Sir Jeffery Amherst to discuss the possibility of using smallpox-infested blankets to spread smallpox amongst Natives. Amherst wrote to Bouquet that: "Could it not be contrived to send the small pox among the disaffected tribes of Indians? We must on this occasion use every stratagem in our power to reduce them." Bouquet replied in a latter, writing that "I will try to inocculate [sic] the Indians by means of Blankets that may fall in their hands, taking care however not to get the disease myself. As it is pity to oppose good men against them, I wish we could make use of the Spaniard's Method, and hunt them with English Dogs. Supported by Rangers, and some Light Horse, who would I think effectively extirpate or remove that Vermine." After receiving Bouquet's response, Amherst wrote back to him, stating that "You will Do well to try to Innoculate [sic] the Indians by means of Blankets, as well as to try Every other method that can serve to Extirpate this Execrable Race. I should be very glad your Scheme for Hunting them Down by Dogs could take Effect, but England is at too great a Distance to think of that at present."

=== New South Wales ===
Many Aboriginal Australians have claimed that smallpox outbreaks in Australia were a deliberate result of European colonisation, though this possibility has only been raised by historians from the 1980s onwards, when Noel Butlin suggested "there are some possibilities that... disease could have been used deliberately as an exterminating agent."

In 1997, scholar David Day claimed there "remains considerable circumstantial evidence to suggest that officers other than Phillip, or perhaps convicts or soldiers... deliberately spread smallpox among aborigines", and in 2000, John Lambert argued that "strong circumstantial evidence suggests the smallpox epidemic which ravaged Aborigines in 1789, may have resulted from deliberate infection."

Judy Campbell argued in 2002 that it is highly improbable that the First Fleet was the source of the epidemic, as "smallpox had not occurred in any members of the First Fleet"; the only possible source of infection from the Fleet being exposure to variolous matter imported for the purposes of inoculation against smallpox. Campbell argued that, while there has been considerable speculation about a hypothetical exposure to the First Fleet's variolous matter, there was no evidence that Aboriginal people were ever actually exposed to it. She pointed to regular contact between fishing fleets from the Indonesia archipelago, where smallpox was always present, and Aboriginal people in Australia's North as a more likely source for the introduction of smallpox. She notes that while these fishermen are generally referred to as 'Macassans', referring to the port of Macassar on the island of Sulawesi from which most of the fishermen originated, "some travelled from islands as distant as New Guinea". She noted that there is little disagreement that the smallpox epidemic of the 1860s was contracted from Macassan fishermen and spread through the Aboriginal population by Aborigines fleeing outbreaks and also via their traditional social, kinship and trading networks. She argued that the 1789–90 epidemic followed the same pattern.

These claims are controversial, as it is argued that any smallpox virus brought to New South Wales probably would have been sterilised by heat and humidity encountered during the voyage of the First Fleet from England and incapable of biological warfare. However, in 2007, Christopher Warren demonstrated that any smallpox which might have been carried on board the First Fleet may have been still viable upon landing in Australia. Since them, some scholars have argued that smallpox in Australia was deliberately spread by the inhabitants of the British penal colony at Port Jackson in 1789.

In 2013, Warren reviewed the issue and argued that smallpox did not spread across Australia before 1824 and showed that there was no smallpox at Macassar that could have caused the outbreak at Sydney. Warren, however, did not address the issue of persons who joined the Macassan fleet from other islands and from parts of Sulawesi other than the port of Macassar. Warren concluded that the British were "the most likely candidates to have released smallpox" near Sydney Cove in 1789. Warren proposed that the British had no choice as they were confronted with dire circumstances when, among other factors, they ran out of ammunition for their muskets; he also used Aboriginal oral tradition and archaeological records from indigenous gravesites to analyse the cause and effect of the spread of smallpox in 1789.

Prior to the publication of Warren's article (2013), a professor of physiology John Carmody argued that the epidemic was an outbreak of chickenpox which took a drastic toll on an Aboriginal population without immunological resistance. With regard to how smallpox might have reached the Sydney region, Carmody said: "There is absolutely no evidence to support any of the theories and some of them are fanciful and far-fetched." Warren argued against the chickenpox theory at endnote 3 of Smallpox at Sydney Cove – Who, When, Why?. However, in a 2014 joint paper on historic Aboriginal demography, Carmody and the Australian National University's Boyd Hunter argued that the recorded behavior of the epidemic ruled out smallpox and indicated chickenpox.

== 20th century ==
By the turn of the 20th century, advances in microbiology had made thinking about "germ warfare" part of the zeitgeist. Jack London, in his short story '"Yah! Yah! Yah!"' (1909), described a punitive European expedition to a South Pacific island deliberately exposing the Polynesian population to measles, of which many of them died. London wrote another science fiction tale the following year, "The Unparalleled Invasion" (1910), in which the Western nations wipe out all of China with a biological attack.

=== First World War ===
During the First World War (1914–1918), the German Empire made some early attempts at anti-agriculture biological warfare. Those attempts were made by a special sabotage group headed by Rudolf Nadolny. Using diplomatic pouches and couriers, the German General Staff supplied small teams of saboteurs in Russia's Grand Duchy of Finland, and in the then neutral countries of Romania, the United States, and Argentina. In Finland, saboteurs mounted on reindeer placed ampoules of anthrax in stables of Russian horses in 1916. Anthrax was also supplied to the German military attaché in Bucharest, as was glanders, which was employed against livestock destined for Allied service. German intelligence officer and U.S. citizen Anton Casimir Dilger established a secret lab in the basement of his sister's home in Chevy Chase, Maryland, that produced glanders which was used to infect livestock in ports and inland collection points including, at least, Newport News, Norfolk, Baltimore, and New York City, and probably St. Louis and Covington, Kentucky. In Argentina, German agents also employed glanders in the port of Buenos Aires and also tried to ruin wheat harvests with a destructive fungus. Also, Germany itself became a victim of similar attacks — horses bound for Germany were infected with Burkholderia by French operatives in Switzerland.

The Geneva Protocol of 1925 prohibited the use of chemical weapons and biological weapons among signatory states in international armed conflicts, but said nothing about experimentation, production, storage, or transfer; later treaties did cover these aspects. Twentieth-century advances in microbiology enabled the first pure-culture biological agents to be developed by World War II.

=== Interwar period and WWII ===
In the interwar period, little research was done in biological warfare in both Britain and the United States at first. In the United Kingdom, the preoccupation was mainly in withstanding the anticipated conventional bombing attacks that would be unleashed in the event of war with Germany. As tensions increased, Sir Frederick Banting began lobbying the British government to establish a research program into the research and development of biological weapons to effectively deter the Germans from launching a biological attack. Banting proposed a number of innovative schemes for the dissemination of pathogens, including aerial-spray attacks and germs distributed through the mail system.

==== Japan ====
The most notorious program of the period was run by the secret Imperial Japanese Army Unit 731 during the war, based at Pingfan in Manchuria and commanded by Lieutenant General Shirō Ishii. This unit did research on BW, conducted often fatal human experiments on prisoners, and produced biological weapons for combat use. Although the Japanese effort lacked the technological sophistication of the American or British programs, it far outstripped them in its widespread application and indiscriminate brutality. Biological weapons were used against both Chinese soldiers and civilians in several military campaigns. Three veterans of Unit 731 testified in a 1989 interview to the Asahi Shimbun that they contaminated the Horustein river with typhoid near the Soviet troops during the Battle of Khalkhin Gol. In 1940, the Imperial Japanese Army Air Force bombed Ningbo with ceramic bombs full of fleas carrying the bubonic plague. A film showing this operation was seen by the imperial princes Tsuneyoshi Takeda and Takahito Mikasa during a screening made by mastermind Shirō Ishii. During the Khabarovsk War Crime Trials the accused, such as Major General Kiyashi Kawashima, testified that as early as 1941 some 40 members of Unit 731 air-dropped plague-contaminated fleas on Changde. These operations caused epidemic plague outbreaks.

Many of these operations were ineffective due to inefficient delivery systems, using disease-bearing insects rather than dispersing the agent as a bioaerosol cloud. Nevertheless, some modern Chinese historians estimate that 400,000 Chinese died as a direct result of Japanese field testing and operational use of biological weapons.

Ban Shigeo, a technician at the Japanese Army's 9th Technical Research Institute, left an account of the activities at the Institute which was published in "The Truth About the Army Noborito Institute". Ban included an account of his trip to Nanking in 1941 to participate in the testing of poisons on Chinese prisoners. His testimony tied the Noborito Institute to the infamous Unit 731, which participated in biomedical research.

During the final months of World War II, Japan planned to utilize plague as a biological weapon against U.S. civilians in San Diego, California, during Operation Cherry Blossoms at Night. They hoped that it would kill tens of thousands of U.S. civilians and thereby dissuade America from attacking Japan. The plan was finalized on March 26, 1945, but shelved shortly thereafter due to the strong opposition of Chief of General Staff Yoshijirō Umezu. Umezu later explained his decision as such: "If bacteriological warfare is conducted, it will grow from the dimension of war between Japan and America to an endless battle of humanity against bacteria. Japan will earn the derision of the world."

When the war ended, the U.S. Army quietly enlisted certain members of Noborito in its efforts against the communist camp in the early years of the Cold War. The head of Unit 731, Shirō Ishii, was granted immunity from war crimes prosecution in exchange for providing information to the United States on the Unit's activities. Allegations were made that a "chemical section" of a U.S. clandestine unit hidden within Yokosuka naval base was operational during the Korean War, and then worked on unspecified projects inside the United States from 1955 to 1959, before returning to Japan to enter the private sector.

Some of the Unit 731 personnel were imprisoned by the Soviets, and may have been a potential source of information on Japanese weaponization.

==== United Kingdom ====
With the onset of hostilities, the Ministry of Supply finally established a biological weapons programme at Porton Down, headed by the microbiologist Paul Fildes. The research was championed by Winston Churchill and soon tularemia, anthrax, brucellosis, and botulism toxins had been effectively weaponized. In particular, Gruinard Island in Scotland, during a series of extensive tests, was contaminated with anthrax for the next 48 years. Although Britain never used the biological weapons it developed, its program was the first to successfully weaponize a variety of deadly pathogens and put them into industrial production—notably for a never-used plan to attack Germany with anthrax: Operation Vegetarian. Other nations, notably France and Japan, had begun their own biological weapons programs.

==== United States ====
When the United States entered the war, mounting British pressure for the creation of a similar research program for an Allied pooling of resources led to the creation of a large industrial complex at Fort Detrick, Maryland, in 1942 under the direction of George W. Merck. The biological and chemical weapons developed during that period were tested at the Dugway Proving Grounds in Utah. Soon, there were facilities for the mass production of anthrax spores, brucellosis, and botulism toxins, although the war was over before these weapons could be of much operational use.

=== Postwar period ===
Considerable research into BW was undertaken throughout the Cold War era by the U.S., UK and USSR, and probably other major nations as well, although it is generally believed that such weapons were never used.

In Britain, the 1950s saw the weaponization of plague, brucellosis, tularemia and later equine encephalomyelitis and vaccinia viruses. Trial tests at sea were carried out including Operation Cauldron off Stornoway in 1952. The programme was cancelled in 1956, when the British government unilaterally renounced the use of biological and chemical weapons.

The United States initiated its weaponization efforts with disease vectors in 1953, focused on Plague-fleas, EEE-mosquitoes, and yellow fever – mosquitoes (OJ-AP). However, U.S. medical scientists in occupied Japan undertook extensive research on insect vectors, with the assistance of former Unit 731 staff, as early as 1946.

The United States Army Chemical Corps then initiated a crash program to weaponize anthrax (N) in the E61 1/2-lb hour-glass bomblet. Though the program was successful in meeting its development goals, the lack of validation on the infectivity of anthrax stalled standardization. The United States Air Force was also unsatisfied with the operational qualities of the M114/US bursting bomblet and labeled it an interim item until the Chemical Corps could deliver a superior weapon.

Around 1950, the Chemical Corps also initiated a program to weaponize tularemia (UL). Shortly after the E61/N failed to make standardization, tularemia was standardized in the 3.4" M143 bursting spherical bomblet. This was intended for delivery by the MGM-29 Sergeant missile warhead and could produce 50% infection over a 7-square-mile (18 km^{2}) area. Although tularemia is treatable by antibiotics, treatment does not shorten the course of the disease. U.S. conscientious objectors were used as consenting test subjects for tularemia in a program known as Operation Whitecoat. There were also many unpublicized tests carried out in public places with bioagent simulants during the Cold War.

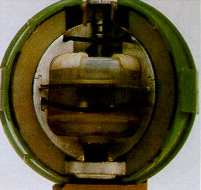
E120 biological bomblet, developed before the U.S. signed the Biological and Toxic Weapons Convention.

In addition to the use of bursting bomblets for creating biological aerosols, the Chemical Corps started investigating aerosol-generating bomblets in the 1950s. The E99 was the first workable design but was too complex to be manufactured. By the late 1950s, the 4.5" E120 spraying spherical bomblet was developed; a B-47 bomber with a SUU-24/A dispenser could infect 50% or more of the population of a 16-square-mile (41 km^{2}) area with tularemia with the E120. The E120 was later superseded by dry-type agents.

Dry-type biologicals resemble talcum powder, and can be disseminated as aerosols using gas expulsion devices instead of a burster or complex sprayer. The Chemical Corps developed Flettner rotor bomblets and later triangular bomblets for wider coverage due to improved glide angles over Magnus-lift spherical bomblets. Weapons of this type were in advanced development by the time the program ended.

From January 1962, Rocky Mountain Arsenal "grew, purified and biodemilitarized" plant pathogen Wheat Stem Rust (Agent TX), Puccinia graminis, var. tritici, for the Air Force biological anti-crop program. TX-treated grain was grown at the Arsenal from 1962–1968 in Sections 23–26. Unprocessed TX was also transported from Beale AFB for purification, storage, and disposal. Trichothecenes mycotoxin is a toxin that can be extracted from Wheat Stem Rust and Rice Blast and can kill or incapacitate depending on the concentration used. The "red mold disease" of wheat and barley in Japan is prevalent in the region that faces the Pacific Ocean. Toxic trichothecenes, including nivalenol, deoxynivalenol, and monoace tylnivalenol (fusarenon- X) from Fusarium nivale, can be isolated from moldy grains. In the suburbs of Tokyo, an illness similar to "red mold disease" was described in an outbreak of a foodborne disease, as a result of the consumption of Fusarium-infected rice. Ingestion of moldy grains that are contaminated with trichothecenes has been associated with mycotoxicosis.

China and North Korea accused the U.S. of large-scale field testing of BW against them during the Korean War (1950–1953), allegedly with the assistance of Japanese biologists from Unit 731. Hundreds of Chinese and North Korean soldiers as well as civilians were infected with a variety of diseases, such as meningitis and bubonic plague, with dozens dying as a result. The Communist governments instituted a broad vaccination campaign among citizens and soldiers as a response to the attacks. At the time of the Korean War, the United States had only weaponized one agent, brucellosis ("Agent US"), which is caused by Brucella suis. The original weaponized form used the M114 bursting bomblet in M33 cluster bombs. While the specific form of the biological bomb was classified until some years after the Korean War, in the various exhibits of biological weapons that Korea alleged were dropped on their country, nothing resembled an M114 bomblet. There were ceramic containers that had some similarity to Japanese weapons used against the Chinese in World War II, developed by Unit 731.

Cuba also accused the United States of spreading human and animal disease on their island nation.

During the 1948 Palestine war, the Israeli Haganah militia and Israel Defense Forces carried out Operation Cast Thy Bread, releasing Salmonella typhi bacteria into the water supply for the city of Acre, causing an outbreak of typhoid among the inhabitants. Egyptian troops later claimed to have captured disguised Haganah soldiers near wells in Gaza, whom they executed for allegedly attempting another attack. Israel denies these allegations.

=== Biological and Toxin Weapons Convention ===
In mid-1969, the United Kingdom and the Warsaw Pact, separately, introduced proposals to the United Nations to ban biological weapons, which would lead to the signing of the Biological and Toxin Weapons Convention in 1972. United States President Richard Nixon signed an executive order in November 1969, which stopped production of biological weapons in the United States and allowed only scientific research of lethal biological agents and defensive measures such as immunization and biosafety. The biological munition stockpiles were destroyed, and approximately 2,200 researchers became redundant.

Special munitions for the United States Special Forces and the CIA and the Big Five Weapons for the military were destroyed in accordance with Nixon's executive order to end the offensive program. The CIA maintained its collection of biologicals well into 1975 when it became the subject of the senate Church Committee.

The Biological and Toxin Weapons Convention was signed by the U.S., UK, USSR and other nations, as a ban on "development, production and stockpiling of microbes or their poisonous products except in amounts necessary for protective and peaceful research" in 1972. The convention bound its signatories to a far more stringent set of regulations than had been envisioned by the 1925 Geneva Protocols. By 1996, 137 countries had signed the treaty; however, it is believed that since the signing of the Convention, the number of countries capable of producing such weapons has increased.

The Soviet Union continued research and production of offensive biological weapons in a program called Biopreparat, despite having signed the convention. The United States had no solid proof of this program until Vladimir Pasechnik defected in 1989, and Kanatjan Alibekov, the first deputy director of Biopreparat, defected in 1992. Pathogens developed by the organization would be used in open-air trials. It is known that Vozrozhdeniye Island, located in the Aral Sea, was used as a testing site. In 1971, such testing led to the accidental aerosol release of smallpox over the Aral Sea and a subsequent smallpox epidemic.

During the closing stages of the Rhodesian Bush War, the Rhodesian government resorted to use chemical and biological warfare agents. Watercourses at several sites inside the Mozambique border were deliberately contaminated with cholera. These biological attacks had little overall impact on the fighting capability of ZANLA, but resulted in at least 809 recorded deaths of insurgents. It also caused considerable distress to the local population. The Rhodesians also experimented with several other pathogens and toxins for use in their counterinsurgency.

After the 1991 Persian Gulf War, Iraq admitted to the United Nations inspection team to having produced 19,000 liters of concentrated botulinum toxin, of which approximately 10,000 L were loaded into military weapons; the 19,000 liters have never been fully accounted for. This is approximately three times the amount needed to kill the entire current human population by inhalation, although, in practice, it would be impossible to distribute it so efficiently, and, unless it is protected from oxygen, it deteriorates in storage.

According to the U.S. Congress Office of Technology Assessment, eight countries were generally reported as having undeclared offensive biological warfare programs in 1995: China, Iran, Iraq, Israel, Libya, North Korea, Syria and Taiwan. Five countries had admitted to having had offensive weapon or development programs in the past: United States, Russia, France, the United Kingdom, and Canada. Offensive BW programs in Iraq were dismantled by Coalition Forces and the UN after the first Gulf War (1990–91), although an Iraqi military BW program was covertly maintained in defiance of international agreements until it was apparently abandoned during 1995 and 1996.

== 21st century ==
On September 18, 2001, and for a few days thereafter, several letters were received by members of the U.S. Congress and American media outlets which contained intentionally prepared anthrax spores; the attack sickened at least 22 people, of whom five died. The identity of the bioterrorist remains unknown, although in 2008, authorities stated that Bruce Ivins was likely the perpetrator. (See 2001 anthrax attacks.)

Suspicions of an ongoing Iraqi biological warfare program were not substantiated in the wake of the March 2003 invasion of that country. Later that year, however, Muammar Gaddafi was persuaded to terminate Libya's biological warfare program. In 2008, according to a U.S. Congressional Research Service report, China, Cuba, Egypt, Iran, Israel, North Korea, Russia, Syria and Taiwan are considered, with varying degrees of certainty, to have some biological warfare capability. According to the same 2008 report by the U.S. Congressional Research Service, "Developments in biotechnology, including genetic engineering, may produce a wide variety of live agents and toxins that are difficult to detect and counter; and new chemical warfare agents and mixtures of chemical weapons and biowarfare agents are being developed . . . Countries are using the natural overlap between weapons and civilian applications of chemical and biological materials to conceal chemical weapon and bioweapon production." By 2011, 165 countries had officially joined the BWC and pledged to disavow biological weapons.

== List of historical biological weapons programs by country ==
- United States biological weapons program
- United Kingdom and weapons of mass destruction § Biological weapons
- Soviet biological weapons program
- Japanese Unit 731
- Iraqi biological weapons program (see also Iraq and weapons of mass destruction)
- South Africa and weapons of mass destruction § Biological and chemical weapons
- Rhodesia and weapons of mass destruction

== See also ==
- Biological warfare in popular culture
