= E61 anthrax bomblet =

Biological cluster bomb sub-munition

The E61 anthrax bomblet was an American biological sub-munition for the E133 cluster bomb. This anti-personnel weapon was developed in the early 1950s and carried 35 milliliters of anthrax spores or another pathogen.

== History ==
Around October 1953 the United States Air Force reoriented its biological warfare program. One result of this, in anti-personnel weaponry, was a move away from weapons such as the M33 cluster bomb to the lethal E61 anthrax bomb. The E61 was first developed in January 1951 as both an anti-personnel and anti-animal weapon capable of being clustered and dropped from a medium height. On March 5, 1954, a directive from the U.S. Department of Defense altered the course of the U.S. biological weapons program. The program shifted focus to developing munitions that were not only improved but those that could be delivered by high speed aircraft and balloon. The weapons referred to included the E61 bomblet.

== Specifications ==
The E61 bomblet was a 1/2-pound (230 g) anti-personnel bomb designed to be carried in the E133 cluster bomb. The cluster bomb was designed to hold about 540 of the E61 anthrax bomblets. The E61 held about 35 milliliters (1.2 U.S. fl oz) of agent and a variety of pathogens could be used, generally anthrax spores. The E61 was perceived as superior to its predecessors, the M33 cluster bomb and its payload of M114 bombs. In fact, four of the smaller E61 bomblets produced twice the coverage area of the larger M114 bomb. Upon impact the E61 would detonate releasing an aerosol of its anthrax spore laden slurry into the air of its target area.

== See also ==
- E120 bomblet
- E14 munition
- Flettner rotor bomblet
- M143 bomblet
