= E14 munition =

Cardboard submunition

The E14 munition was a cardboard sub-munition (air-dropped or ground-launched munitions that eject smaller submunitions) developed by the United States biological weapons program as an anti-crop weapon. In a series of field tests in 1955, the E14 was loaded with fleas and air-dropped.

== History ==
The E14 munition was developed by the United States for use in its offensive biological warfare arsenal as an anti-crop weapon. After the Korean War U.S. interest in large-scale entomological warfare increased. The E14 was one of two sub-munitions used in large-scale testing aimed at learning the feasibility and result of an air-dropped insect attack.

In September 1954, at Dugway Proving Ground in Utah, the E14 was again used in a series of tests known as "Operation Big Itch". During Big Itch, uninfected rat fleas (Xenopsylla cheopis) were loaded into the E14 and air-dropped over the proving ground.

The E14 used cardboard and sponge inserts to hold the fleas inside the cardboard container. With the sponge inserts in place, the E14 could hold about 100,000 fleas. Eighty cardboard inserts, or "loop tubes", could be carried in the E14 as well. The munition could hold 80 loop tubes, each one capable of holding 3,000 fleas. The testing in Utah was ultimately successful.

In May 1955 the U.S. utilized the E14 in field test, this time in the U.S. state of Georgia. The E14 was packed with "aircomb waffles" or loop tubes, instead of fleas these tests used uninfected yellow fever mosquitoes (Aedes aegypti). The successful Georgia trials were known as "Operation Big Buzz".

== Specifications ==
The E14 munition was a sub-munition that can be clustered in the E86 cluster bomb. It was a 9 3/4-inch (248 mm) long, 13-inch (330 mm) wide cardboard container. Internally the bomb contained an actuator powered by pressurized carbon dioxide, a piston that would expel the bomb's contents, and a small parachute, to be deployed when the weapon was dropped from the E86 cluster bomb. The weapons were designed to release their payload of biological agent, be it a vector or anti-crop agent, at 1,000–2,000 feet (300–610 m) above the ground, after it was released from the cluster munition.

== See also ==
- E120 bomblet
- E23 munition
- E61 anthrax bomblet
- Flettner rotor bomblet
- M143 bomblet
