= E23 munition =

American-developed anti-crop weapon

The E23 munition was a cardboard sub-munition developed by the United States biological weapons program for use as an anti-crop weapon. The E23 underwent a conversion for use as a vector weapon and was briefly used in large-scale entomological warfare trial but technical issues forced it from the tests.

== History ==
The E23 munition was originally conceived as an anti-crop weapon. When, following the Korean War, U.S. interest in large-scale entomological warfare increased, the E23 was one of two munitions involved in field testing the potential of insect vectors as weapons.

== Specifications ==
The E23 was made of cardboard and had a diameter of 9.75 inches (24.8 cm) and a length of 18 inches (46 cm). Essentially a cardboard container, the E23 consisted of an internal actuator which simply reversed a plastic bag, expelling its contents. The E23 sub-munition also included a small parachute for use when dropped from the E77 cluster bomb. The weapon was deployed between 2,000 and 1,000 feet in altitude after its release from the cluster bomb. Once converted for use as a vector weapon the E23 could hold 200,000 rat fleas in its interior among small pieces of sponge.

== Issues ==
Initially, the E23 was involved in "Operation Big Itch". In September 1954 Big Itch aimed to determine coverage patterns and survivability of uninfected tropical rat fleas (Xenopsylla cheopis) for use in biological warfare as disease vector. In preliminary Big Itch tests approximately half of the E23 munitions failed to properly function. In one instance, the problems with the E23 led uninfected fleas to escape into the aircraft where they bit the pilot, bombardier and an observer. These problems led to the E23 being pulled off of Operation Big Itch. Despite the problems with the E23, the Big Itch field trials ultimately proved successful.

== See also ==
- E14 munition
- E86 cluster bomb
