= E133 cluster bomb =

American biological weapon

The E133 cluster bomb was a U.S. biological weapon developed during the Cold War.

== History ==
The U.S. E133 cluster bomb was developed prior to Richard M. Nixon's 1969 declaration that ended the U.S. biological weapons program. At the time of Nixon's declaration the E133 was considered the most likely candidate in the U.S. biological arsenal to actually be used in a combat situation.

== Specifications ==
The E133 cluster weighed 750 pounds. It held between 536 and 544 E61 bomblets, which when dropped would detonate on impact dispersing an aerosol of biological agent, usually anthrax.

== See also ==
- Operation Polka Dot
