= United States and weapons of mass destruction =

United States of America
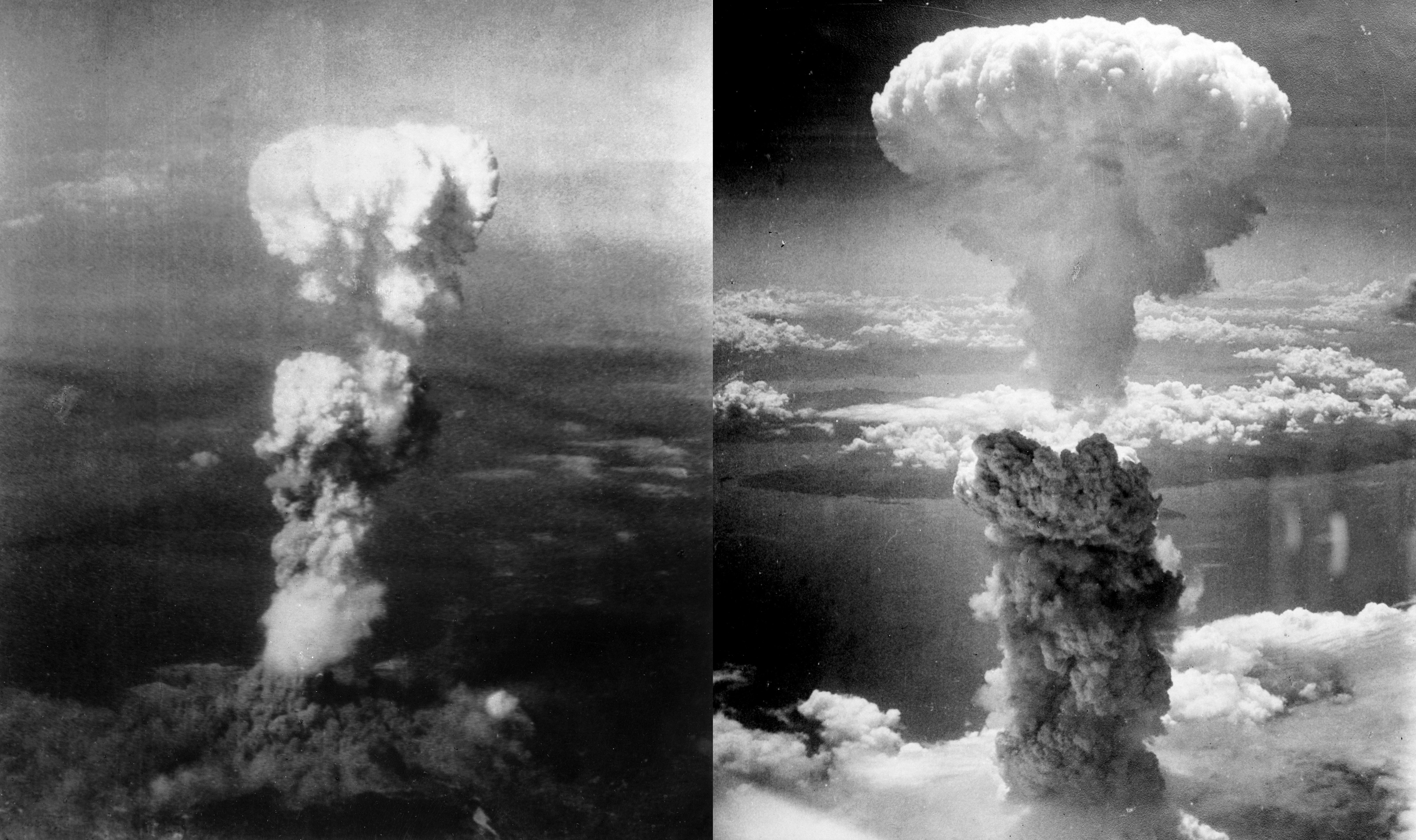
- Atomic bombings of Hiroshima and Nagasaki, 1945. The US is the only country to have used nuclear weapons in war.

- Nuclear program start date: 21 October 1939
- First nuclear weapon test: 16 July 1945 (Gadget))
- First thermonuclear weapon test: 1 November 1952 (Ivy Mike)
- Last nuclear test: 23 September 1992
- Largest yield test: 15 Mt (Castle Bravo)
- Total tests: 1,054 detonations
- Peak stockpile: 32,040 warheads (1967)
- Current stockpile: 3,700 total (2026)
- Deployed warheads: 1,770 (2026)
- Total deployed warhead megatonnage: ≈403.21 (2026)
- Maximum missile range: 13,000 km (8,078 mi) (land); 12,000 km (7,456 mi) (submarine
- NPT party: Yes (1968, one of five recognized powers)

The nuclear weapons of the United States comprise the second-largest arsenal in the world, behind Russia. The US is only country to have used nuclear weapons in warfare, in the atomic bombings of Hiroshima and Nagasaki at the end of World War II. The Manhattan Project, begun in 1942, made the US the first nuclear-armed country. The US operates a nuclear triad. The US previously possessed chemical and biological weapons. It is a ratifier of the nuclear Non-Proliferation Treaty, Biological Weapons Convention, and Chemical Weapons Convention.

As of 2025, the United States actively deploys approximately 1,770 warheads, mostly under Strategic Command, (Note: B61 nuclear bombs stored in European NATO countries under nuclear sharing are under the command of United States Air Forces in Europe via munitions squadrons.) to its nuclear triad. Of these, 970 warheads on Trident II submarine-launched ballistic missiles aboard to Ohio-class submarines, with 400 warheads to silo-based Minuteman III intercontinental ballistic missiles, and 300 bombs and cruise missiles to B-2 Spirit and B-52 Stratofortress bombers. The US also forward deploys nuclear weapons in the form of approximately 100 B61 bombs in six European NATO countries: Belgium, Germany, Italy, the Netherlands, Turkey, and United Kingdom. The US warhead inventory totals 5,177 warheads, with 1,930 warheads for reserve use, and another 1,477 awaiting dismantlement.

The US carried out the first nuclear test, Trinity, three weeks prior to the atomic bombings. The Cold War's nuclear arms race began; in 1949 the Soviet Union carried out its first nuclear test, prompting the US to develop and test the first thermonuclear weapon, Ivy Mike. From the 1950s, the US stationed nuclear weapons overseas in Europe and East Asia. The 1962 Cuban Missile Crisis is regarded as a close call with World War III.

The US carried out 1,054 nuclear tests from 1945 to 1992, primarily at the Nevada Test Site and Pacific Proving Grounds. It signed the Comprehensive Nuclear-Test-Ban Treaty in 1996.

The US chemical weapons program began during World War I, and during the Cold War stockpiled primarily sarin, VX, and mustard gas. These were deployed abroad, including in Okinawa and West Germany, and withdrawn in 1971 and in 1990 respectively. Under the Central Intelligence Agency's MKUltra, psychochemical warfare was also investigated, weaponizing the BZ incapacitating agent. The US committed to destroying its chemical weapons arsenal in 1991, which was accomplished by 2023 at a total cost of US$40 billion.

The US biological weapons program ran from 1943 to 1969. It weaponized and stockpiled the biological agents that cause anthrax, botulism, brucellosis, Q-fever, toxic shock syndrome, and Venezuelan equine encephalitis virus. In 1969 the program was renounced, alongside the first use of chemical weapons.

== Nuclear weapons ==
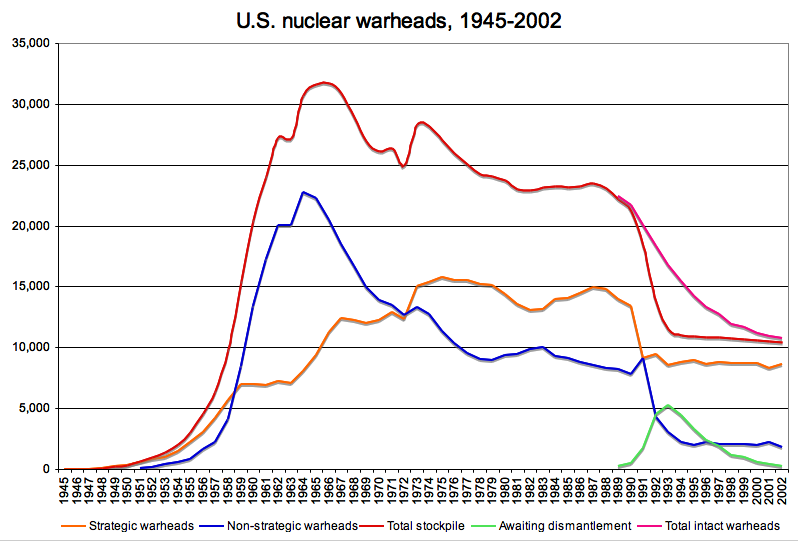
U.S. nuclear warhead stockpiles, 1945–2002.

Nuclear weapons have been used twice in combat: two nuclear weapons were used by the United States against Japan during World War II in the atomic bombings of Hiroshima and Nagasaki. Altogether, the two bombings killed 105,000 people and injured thousands more while devastating hundreds or thousands of military bases, factories, and cottage industries.

The U.S. conducted an extensive nuclear testing program. 1054 tests were conducted between 1945 and 1992. The exact number of nuclear devices detonated is unclear because some tests involved multiple devices while a few failed to explode or were designed not to create a nuclear explosion. The last nuclear test by the United States was on September 23, 1992; the U.S. has signed but not ratified the Comprehensive Nuclear-Test-Ban Treaty.

Currently, the United States nuclear arsenal is deployed in three areas:

- Land-based intercontinental ballistic missiles, or ICBMs;
- Sea-based, nuclear submarine-launched ballistic missiles, or SLBMs; and
- Air-based nuclear weapons of the U.S. Air Force's heavy bomber group

The United States is one of the five "Nuclear Weapons States" under the Treaty on the Non-Proliferation of Nuclear Weapons, which the U.S. ratified in 1968. On October 13, 1999, the U.S. Senate rejected ratification of the Comprehensive Test Ban Treaty, having previously ratified the Partial Test Ban Treaty in 1963. The U.S. has not, however, tested a nuclear weapon since 1992, though it has tested many non-nuclear components and has developed powerful supercomputers to duplicate the knowledge gained from testing without conducting the actual tests themselves.

In the early 1990s, the U.S. stopped developing new nuclear weapons and now devotes most of its nuclear efforts into stockpile stewardship, maintaining and dismantling its now-aging arsenal. The administration of George W. Bush decided in 2003 to engage in research towards a new generation of small nuclear weapons, especially "earth penetrators". The budget passed by the United States Congress in 2004 eliminated funding for some of this research including the "bunker-busting or earth-penetrating" weapons.

The exact number of nuclear weapons possessed by the United States is difficult to determine. Different treaties and organizations have different criteria for reporting nuclear weapons, especially those held in reserve, and those being dismantled or rebuilt:

- In its Strategic Arms Reduction Treaty (START) declaration for 2003, the U.S. listed 5968 deployed warheads as defined by START rules.
- The exact number as of September 30, 2009, was 5,113 warheads, according to a U.S. fact sheet released May 3, 2010.

In 2002, the United States and Russia agreed in the SORT treaty to reduce their deployed stockpiles to not more than 2,200 warheads each. In 2003, the U.S. rejected Russian proposals to further reduce both nation's nuclear stockpiles to 1,500 each. In 2007, for the first time in 15 years, the United States built new warheads. These replaced some older warheads as part of the Minuteman III upgrade program. 2007 also saw the first Minuteman III missiles removed from service as part of the drawdown. Overall, stockpiles and deployment systems continue to decline in number under the terms of the New START treaty.

In 2014, Bulletin of the Atomic Scientists released a report, stating that there are a total of 2,530 warheads kept in reserve, and 2,120 actively deployed. Of the warheads actively deployed, the number of strategic warheads rests at 1,920 (subtracting 200 tactical B61s as part of Nato nuclear weapon sharing arrangements). The amount of warheads being actively disabled rests at about 2,700 warheads, which brings the total United States inventory to about 7,400 warheads.

The U.S. government decided not to sign the UN treaty on the Prohibition of Nuclear Weapons, a binding agreement for negotiations for the total elimination of nuclear weapons, supported by more than 120 nations.

As of early 2019, more than 90% of world's 13,865 nuclear weapons were owned by the United States and Russia. Russia has the most nuclear warheads sitting at 5,977, while the United States has 5,428 warheads.

=== Land-based ICBMs ===
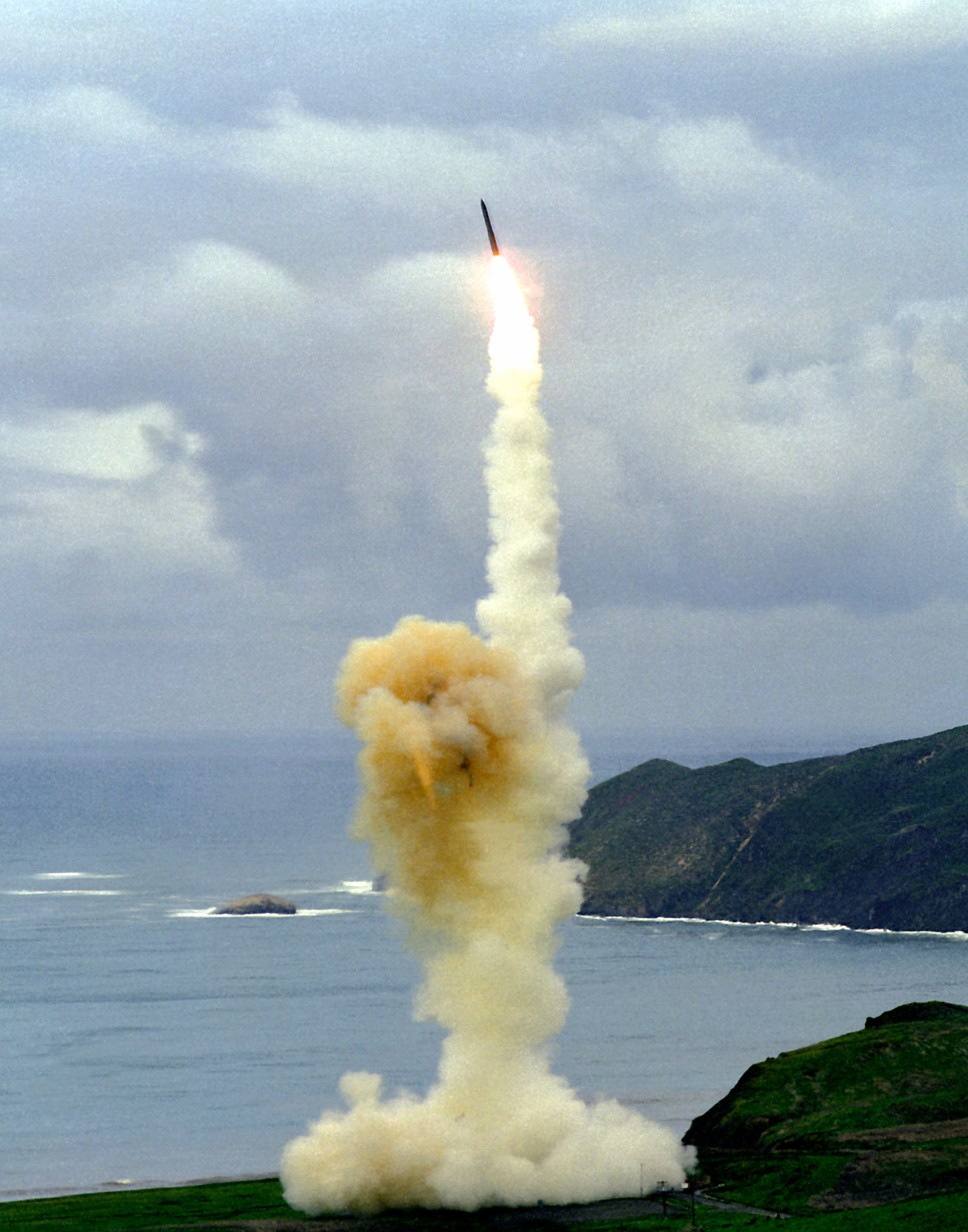
A Minuteman III ICBM test launch.

The U.S. Air Force currently operates 400 Minuteman III ICBMs, located primarily in the northern Rocky Mountain states and the Dakotas. Peacekeeper missiles were phased out of the Air Force inventory in 2005. All USAF Minuteman II missiles were destroyed in accordance with the START treaty and their launch silos imploded and buried then sold to the public under the START II. The U.S. goal under the SORT treaty was to reduce from 1,600 warheads deployed on over 500 missiles in 2003 to 500 warheads on 450 missiles in 2012. The first Minuteman III were removed under this plan in 2007 while, at the same time, the warheads deployed on Minuteman IIIs began to be upgraded from smaller W62s to larger W87s from decommissioned Peacekeeper missiles.

=== Air-based delivery systems ===
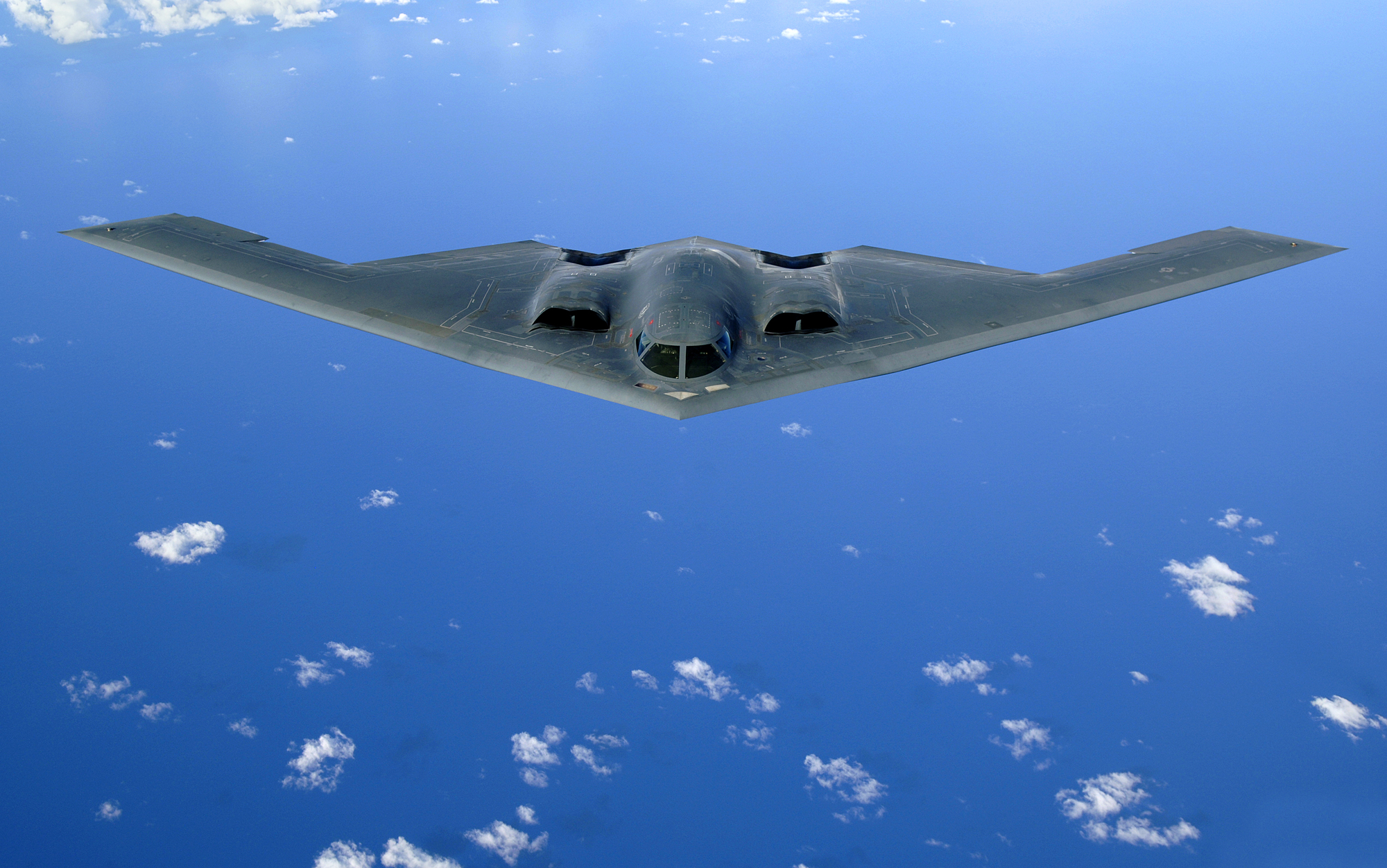
B-2 Spirit stealth strategic bomber.

The U.S. Air Force also operates a strategic nuclear bomber fleet. The bomber force consists of 51 nuclear-armed B-52 Stratofortresses, and 20 B-2 Spirits. All 64 B-1s were retrofitted to operate in a solely conventional mode by 2007 and thus don't count as nuclear platforms.

In addition to this, the U.S. military can also deploy smaller tactical nuclear weapons with conventional fighter-bombers. The U.S. maintains about 400 nuclear gravity bombs capable of use by the F/A-18 Hornet, F-15E, F-16, F-22 and F-35. Some 350 of these bombs are deployed at seven airbases in six European NATO countries; of these, 180 tactical B61 nuclear bombs fall under a nuclear sharing arrangement.

=== Submarine-based ballistic missiles ===
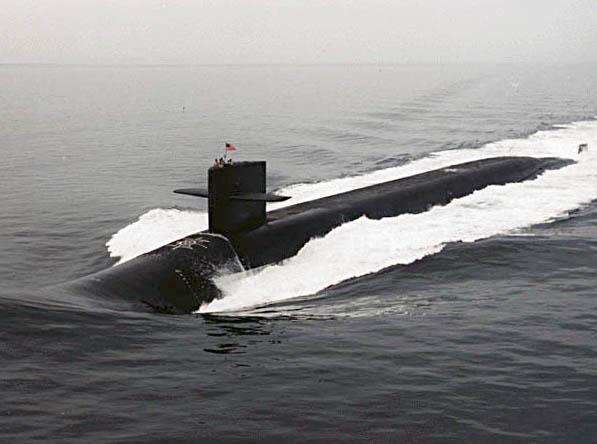
USS Kentucky, an Ohio-class ballistic missile submarine.

The U.S. Navy currently has 18 Ohio-class submarines deployed, of which 14 are ballistic missile submarines. Each submarine is equipped with a maximum complement of 24 Trident II missiles. Approximately 12 U.S. attack submarines were equipped to launch nuclear Tomahawk missiles, but these weapons were removed from service by 2013.

The number of Deployed and Non-Deployed SLBMs on the Ohio-Class SSBNs as of 2018 is 280, of which 203 SLBMs are deployed.

== Biological weapons ==
The United States offensive biological weapons program was instigated by President Franklin Roosevelt and the U.S. Secretary of War in October 1941. Research occurred at several sites. A production facility was built at Terre Haute, Indiana, but testing with a benign agent demonstrated contamination of the facility so no production occurred during World War II.

The US government and military is known for using civilian populations to test the effects of bioweapons. In 1950, the US Navy conducted a secret experiment on the civilian population of the San Francisco Bay Area during operation Operation Sea-Spray, in which over 800,000 residents were unknowingly sprayed with pathogens. This led to at least one death and claims that the ecology had been changed irreversibly.

In 1951, the US military also released fungal spores at the Norfolk Naval Supply Center on African-American workers to see if they are more susceptible to the pathogen than Caucasians. In 1966, the US government released Bacillus globigii on the New York Subway to research how a civilian population can be used to spread pathogens. It is claimed many of those exposed were later found to exhibit long-term medical conditions of which the military has denied causation.

The US government continued similar experiments on civilian populations in other cities across the country until the early 1970s.

The Dugway Proving Ground facility in Utah, opened in 1942, to this day tests and stores biological weapons. The 800,000 acre facility has reportedly weaponized fleas, mosquitoes, as well as conducted experiments on both animal and human subjects.

A more advanced production facility was constructed in Pine Bluff, Arkansas, which began producing biological agents in 1954. Fort Detrick, Maryland, later became a production facility as well as a research site. The U.S. developed anti-personnel and anti-crop biological weapons. Several deployment systems were developed including aerial spray tanks, aerosol spray canisters, grenades, rocket warheads and cluster bombs. (See also U.S. Biological Weapon Testing)

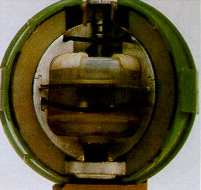
E120 biological bomblet, developed before the U.S. ratified the Biological Weapons Convention.

In mid-1969, the UK and the Warsaw Pact, separately, introduced proposals to the UN to ban biological weapons, which would lead to a treaty in 1972. The U.S. cancelled its offensive biological weapons program by executive order in November 1969 (microorganisms) and February 1970 (toxins) and ordered the destruction of all offensive biological weapons, which occurred between May 1971 and February 1973. The U.S. ratified the Geneva Protocol on January 22, 1975. The U.S. ratified the Biological Weapons Convention (BWC) which came into effect in March 1975.^{[Kissinger 1969]}

Negotiations for a legally binding verification protocol to the BWC proceeded for years. In 2001, negotiations ended when the Bush administration rejected an effort by other signatories to create a protocol for verification, arguing that it could be abused to interfere with legitimate biological research.

The U.S. Army Medical Research Institute of Infectious Diseases, located in Fort Detrick, produces small quantities of biological agents, for use in biological weapons defense research. According to the U.S. government, this research is performed in full accordance with the BWC.

In September 2001, shortly after the September 11 attacks on the United States, there was a series of anthrax attacks aimed at U.S. media offices and the U.S. Senate which killed five people. The anthrax used in the attacks was the Ames strain, which was first studied at Fort Detrick and then distributed to other labs around the world.

== Chemical weapons ==
In World War I, the U.S. had its own chemical weapons program, which produced its own chemical munitions, including phosgene and mustard gas. The U.S. only created about 4% of the total chemical weapons produced for that war and just over 1% of the era's most effective weapon, mustard gas. (U.S. troops suffered less than 6% of gas casualties.) Although the U.S. had begun a large-scale production of Lewisite, for use in an offensive planned for early 1919, Lewisite was not deployed during World War I. The United States also created a special unit, the 1st Gas Regiment, which used phosgene in attacks after being deployed to France.

Chemical weapons were not used by the Allies or Germany during World War II for military purposes, but such weapons were deployed to Europe from the United States. In 1943, German bombers attacked the port of Bari in Southern Italy, sinking several American ships – among them John Harvey, which was carrying mustard gas. The presence of the gas was highly classified, and, according to the U.S. military account, "Sixty-nine deaths were attributed in whole or in part to the mustard gas, most of them American merchant seamen" out of 628 mustard gas military casualties.^{[Navy 2006]}^{[Niderost]} The affair was kept secret at the time and for many years. After the war, the U.S. both participated in arms control talks involving chemical weapons and continued to stockpile them, eventually exceeding 30,000 tons of material.

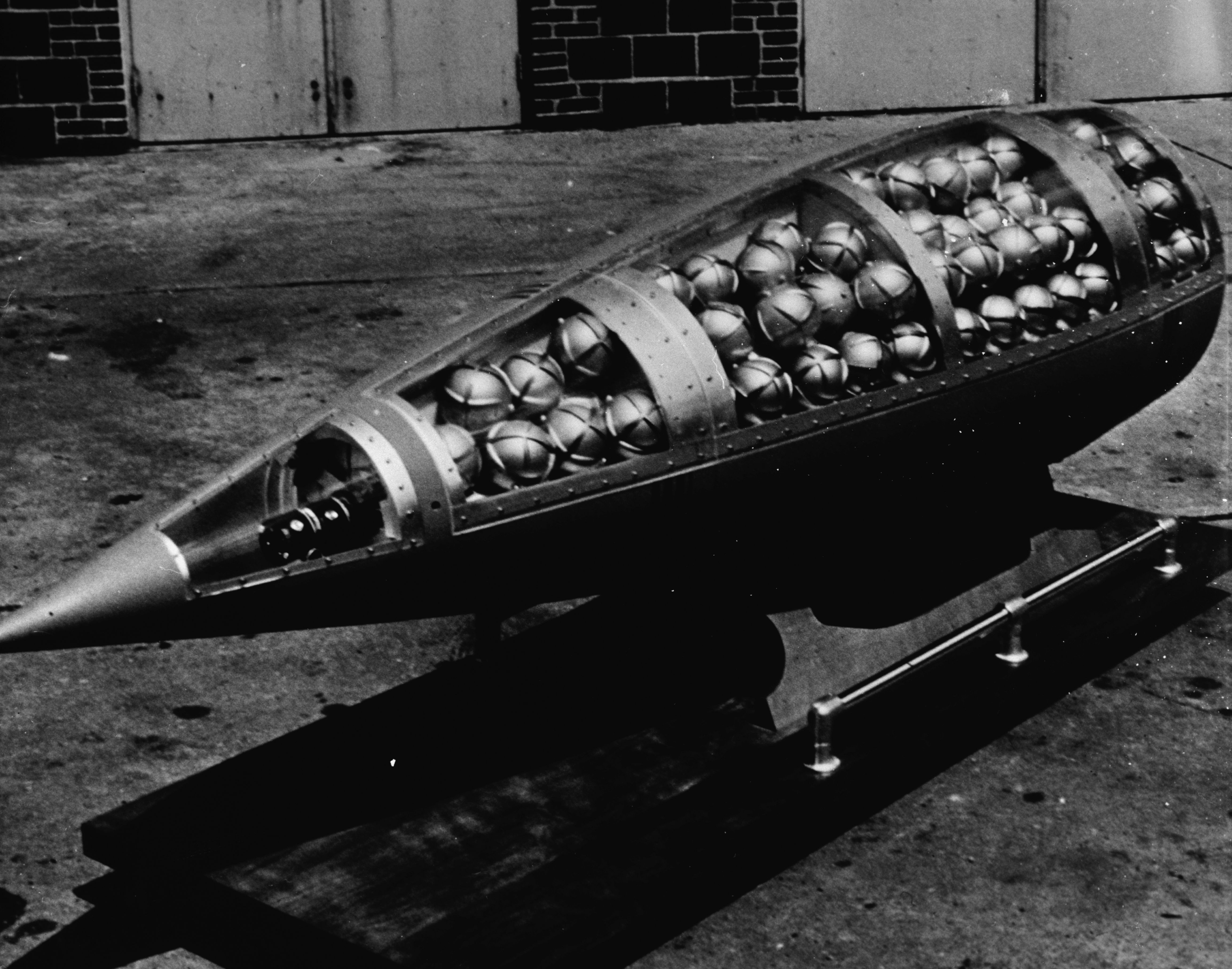
Honest John missile warhead cutaway, showing M134 Sarin bomblets (photo c. 1960)

After the war, all of the former Allies pursued further research on the three new nerve agents developed by the Nazis: tabun, sarin, and soman. Over the following decades, thousands of American military volunteers were exposed to chemical agents during Cold War testing programs, as well as in accidents. (In 1968, one such accident killed approximately 6,400 sheep when an agent drifted out of Dugway Proving Ground during a test.) The U.S. also investigated a wide range of possible nonlethal, psychobehavioral chemical incapacitating agents including psychedelic indoles such as LSD and marijuana derivatives, as well as several glycolate anticholinergics. One of the anticholinergic compounds, 3-quinuclidinyl benzilate, was assigned the NATO code BZ and was weaponized at the beginning of the 1960s for possible battlefield use. Alleged use of chemical agents by the U.S. in the Korean War (1950–53) has never been substantiated.

In late 1969, President Richard Nixon unilaterally renounced the first use of chemical weapons (as well as all methods of biological warfare). He issued a unilateral decree halting production and transport of chemical weapons which remains in effect. From 1967 to 1970 in Operation CHASE, the U.S. disposed of chemical weapons by sinking ships laden with the weapons in the deep Atlantic. The U.S. began to research safer disposal methods for chemical weapons in the 1970s, destroying several thousand tons of mustard gas by incineration and nearly 4,200 tons of nerve agent by chemical neutralization.

The U.S. entered the Geneva Protocol in 1975 (the same time it ratified the Biological Weapons Convention). This was the first operative international treaty on chemical weapons to which the U.S. was party. Stockpile reductions began in the 1980s, with the removal of some outdated munitions and destruction of the entire stock of BZ beginning in 1988. In 1990, destruction of chemical agents stored on Johnston Atoll in the Pacific began, seven years before the Chemical Weapons Convention (CWC) came into effect. In 1986, President Ronald Reagan began removal of the U.S. stockpile of chemical weapons from Germany (see Operation Steel Box). In 1991, President George H. W. Bush unilaterally committed the U.S. to destroying all chemical weapons and renounced the right to chemical weapon retaliation.

In 1993, the U.S. signed the CWC, which required the destruction of all chemical weapon agents, dispersal systems, chemical weapons production facilities by 2012. Both Russia and U.S. missed the CWC's extended deadline of April 2012 to destroy all of their chemical weapons. The United States destroyed 89.75% of the original stockpile of nearly 31,100 metric tons (30,609 long tons) of nerve and mustard agents under the terms of the treaty. Chemical weapons destruction resumed in 2015. The country's last stockpile was at the Blue Grass Army Depot in Kentucky. The U.S. destroyed its final chemical weapon on July 7, 2023. The final weapon to be destroyed was a sarin nerve agent-filled M55 rocket. The total cost for the program to destroy chemical weapons was $40 billion.

== See also ==
- Defense Threat Reduction Agency – The U.S. Department of Defense's official Combat Support Agency for countering weapons of mass destruction.
- Dugway sheep incident
- Enduring Stockpile – the name of the United States's remaining arsenal of nuclear weapons following the end of the Cold War.
- List of U.S. biological weapons topics
- Nuclear weapons and the United States
- Operation Paperclip – the codename under which the U.S. intelligence and military services extricated scientists from Germany, during and after the final stages of World War II.
- Russia and weapons of mass destruction
- Nuclear weapons of the United Kingdom
- United States Army Chemical Corps
- United States missile defense
