= United States biological weapons program =

1943–1973 military research program

The United States biological weapons program officially began in spring 1943 on orders from U.S. president Franklin D. Roosevelt. Research continued following World War II as the U.S. built up a large stockpile of biological agents and weapons. Over the course of its 27-year history, the program weaponized and stockpiled seven bio-agents — Bacillus anthracis (anthrax), Francisella tularensis (tularemia), Brucella spp (brucellosis), Coxiella burnetii (Q-fever), Venezuelan equine encephalitis virus, Botulinum toxin (botulism), and Staphylococcal enterotoxin B. The U.S. also pursued basic research on many more bio-agents. Throughout its history, the U.S. bioweapons program was secret. It was later revealed that laboratory and field testing (some of the latter using simulants on non-consenting individuals) had been common. The official policy of the United States was first to deter the use of bio-weapons against U.S. forces and secondarily to retaliate if deterrence failed.

In 1969, President Richard Nixon ended all offensive (i.e., non-defensive) aspects of the U.S. bio-weapons program. In 1975 the U.S. ratified both the 1925 Geneva Protocol and the 1972 Biological Weapons Convention (BWC)—international treaties outlawing biological warfare.

== History ==
=== Early history (1918–1941) ===
Initial interest in any form of biological warfare came at the close of World War I. The only agent the U.S. tested was the toxin ricin, a product of the castor plant. The U.S. conducted tests concerning two methods of ricin dissemination: the first, which involved adhering the toxin to shrapnel for delivery by artillery shell, was successful; the second, delivering an aerosol cloud of ricin, was proven less successful in these tests. Neither delivery method was perfected before the war in Europe ended.

In the early 1920s suggestions that the U.S. began a biological weapons program were coming from within the Chemical Warfare Service (CWS). Chief of the CWS, Amos Fries, decided that such a program would not be "profitable" for the U.S. Japan's Shirō Ishii, who later served as the director of the infamous Unit 731, began promoting biological weapons during the 1920s and toured biological research facilities worldwide, including in the United States. Though Ishii concluded that the U.S. was developing a bio-weapons program, he was incorrect. In fact, Ishii concluded that each major power he visited was developing a bio-weapons program. As the interwar period continued, the United States did not emphasize biological weapons development or research. While the U.S. was spending very little time on biological weapons research, its future allies and enemies in the upcoming second World War were researching the potential of biological weapons as early as 1933.

=== World War II (1941–45) ===
Despite the World War I-era interest in ricin, as World War II erupted, the United States Army still maintained the position that biological weapons were, for the most part, impractical. Other nations, notably France, Japan and the United Kingdom, thought otherwise and had begun their own biological weapons programs. Thus, as late as 1942 the U.S. had no biological weapons capabilities. Initial interest in biological weapons by the Chemical Warfare Service began in 1941. That fall, U.S. Secretary of War Henry L. Stimson requested that the National Academy of Sciences (NAS) undertake consideration of U.S. biological warfare. He wrote to Dr. Frank B. Jewett, then president of the NAS:

Because of the dangers that might confront this country from potential enemies employing what may be broadly described as biological warfare, it seems advisable that investigations be initiated to survey the present situation and the future possibilities. I am therefore, asking if you will undertake the appointment of an appropriate committee to survey all phases of this matter. Your organization already has before it a request from The Surgeon General for the appointment of a committee by the Division of Medical Sciences of the National Research Council to examine one phase of the matter.

In response the NAS formed a committee, the War Bureau of Consultants (WBC), which issued a report on the subject in February 1942. The report, among other items, recommended the research and development of an offensive biological weapons program.

The British, and the research undertaken by the WBC, pressured the U.S. to begin biological weapons research and development and in November 1942 U.S. President Franklin Roosevelt officially approved an American biological weapons program. In response to the information provided by the WBC, Roosevelt ordered Stimson to form the War Research Service (WRS). Established within the Federal Security Agency, the WRS' stated purpose was to promote "public security and health", but, in reality, the WRS was tasked with coordinating and supervising the U.S. biological warfare program. In the spring of 1943 the U.S. Army Biological Warfare Laboratories were established at Camp Detrick (now Fort Detrick) in Frederick, Maryland.

Though initially, under George Merck, the WRS contracted several universities to participate in the U.S. biological weapons program, the program became large quickly and before long it was under the full control of the CWS. By November 1943 the biological weapons facility at Detrick was completed, in addition, the United States constructed three other facilities - a biological agent production plant at Vigo County near Terre Haute, Indiana (Vigo Ordnance Plant), a field-testing site on Horn Island in Mississippi (Horn Island Testing Station), and another field site near Granite Peak in Utah (Granite Peak Installation). According to an official history of the period, "the elaborate security precautions taken [at Camp Detrick] were so effective that it was not until January 1946, 4 months after VJ Day, that the public learned of the wartime research in biological weapons".

=== Cold War (1947–1969) ===
Following World War II, the United States biological warfare program progressed into an effective, military-driven research and production program, covered in controversy and secrecy. Production of U.S. biological warfare agents went from "factory-level to laboratory-level". By 1950 the principal U.S. bio-weapons facility was located at Camp Detrick in Maryland under the auspices of the Research and Engineering Division of the U.S. Army Chemical Corps. Most of the research and development was done there, while production and testing occurred at Pine Bluff, Arkansas, and Dugway Proving Ground, Utah. Pine Bluff Arsenal began production of weapons-grade agents by 1954. From 1952 to 1954 the Chemical Corps maintained a biological weapons research and development facility at Fort Terry on Plum Island, New York. Fort Terry's focus was on anti-animal biological weapon research and development; the facility researched more than a dozen potential BW agents. From the end of World War II through the Korean War, the U.S. Army, the Chemical Corps and the U.S. Air Force all expanded their biological warfare programs significantly, especially concerning delivery systems. Throughout the Cold War, the United States and the Soviet Union would combine to produce enough biological weapons to kill everyone on Earth.

At the trial of John W. Powell and two other defendants for sedition for reporting that the U.S. used biological weapons during the Korean War, the U.S. Attorney in the case, Robert H. Schnacke and the former Chief of the Special Operations Division at Ft. Detrick during the Korean War (and long-time U.S. Chemical Corps officer), John L. Schwab, entered sworn affidavits that the U.S. Army had the capability to use both offensive and defensive biological and chemical weapons "during the period from January 1, 1949 through July 27, 1953.... based upon resources available and retained only within the continental limits of the United States."

Another substantive expansion phase was during the Kennedy-Johnson years, after McNamara initiated Project 112 as a comprehensive initiative, starting in 1961. Despite an increase in testing, the readiness for biological warfare remained limited after this program. A 10 November 1969 report by the Interdepartmental Political-Military Group submitted its findings to the Nixon administration that the American BW capability was limited:

No large inventory of dry (powdered) anti-personnel lethal or incapacitating biological agents is maintained and only eight aircraft spray disseminators are in the inventory. No missile delivery capabilities are currently maintained for delivery of biological agents, although a bomblet containing warhead for the sergeant missile has been standardized, but not produced in quantity. Small quantities of both lethal and incapacitating biological agents are maintained in special warfare devices.

Field testing of the biological weapons was completed covertly and successfully with simulants and agents dispersed over wide, open areas. The first American large-scale aerosol vulnerability test, code-named Operation Sea-Spray, occurred in the San Francisco Bay Area in September 1950, using two types of bacteria, Bacillus globigii and Serratia marcescens, and fluorescent particles. Bacillus species were chosen in these tests because of their spore-forming abilities and their similarities to Bacillus anthracis, a causing agent of anthrax. S. marcescens was used because it is easily identifiable from its red pigment. In 1966, the New York City Subway was contaminated with Bacillus globigii in an attempt to simulate the spreading of anthrax in a large urban population. More field tests involving pathogenic species were conducted at Dugway Proving Ground, Utah and anti-animal studies were conducted at Eglin Air Force Base, Florida.

At the time, many scientists disagreed with the creation of biological weapons. Theodor Rosebury, who previously worked as a supervisor at Camp Detrick, issued a warning against the development of biological weapons during the Cold War. In 1945, Rosebury left Camp Detrick during a period of time when scientists could publish the results of their research. Rosebury published Peace or Pestilence? in 1949, which explained his views on why biological weapons should be banned by world powers. By the time his book was available, publications were becoming more restricted and the extent of the Soviet threat of biological weapons was being overstated by Congress and the media. In 1969, Harvard biologist Matthew Meselson argued that the biological warfare programs would eventually hurt US security because potential enemy nations could easily emulate these weapons.

The general population remained uninformed of any breakthroughs concerning biological warfare. This included new production plants for anthrax, brucellosis, and anti-crop agents, as well as the development of the cluster bomb. The U.S. public was also unaware of ongoing studies, particularly the environmental and open-air experiments that were taking place. One of the more controversial experiments was conducted in 1951, when a disproportionate number of African Americans were exposed to the fungus Aspergillus fumigatus, to see if they were more susceptible to infection. Some scientists reasoned that such knowledge would help them prepare a defense against a more deadly form of the fungus. The same year, workers at the Norfolk Supply Center in Norfolk, Virginia, were unknowingly exposed to Aspergillus fumigatus spores. Another case of human research was the biodefense medical research program, Operation Whitecoat. This decade-long experiment on volunteer Seventh Day Adventist servicemen exposed them to tularaemia via aerosols. They were then treated with antibiotics. The goal of the experiment, unknown to the volunteers, was to standardize tularaemia bomb-fill for attacks on civilian populations.

In the 1960s, the U.S. changed its main approach from biological agents aimed to kill to those that would incapacitate. In 1964, research programs studied Enterotoxin type B, which can cause food poisoning. New research initiatives also included prophylaxis, the preventive treatment of diseases. Pathogens studied included the biological agents causing a myriad of diseases such as anthrax, glanders, brucellosis, melioidosis, Venezuelan equine encephalitis, Q fever, coccidioidomycosis, and other plant and animal pathogens.

The Vietnam War brought public awareness to the U.S. biological weapons program. The use of chemicals, riot-control agents, and herbicides like Agent Orange drew international criticism, and negatively affected the U.S. public opinion on the development of biological weapons. Highly controversial human research programs and open air experiments were discovered. Jeanne Guillemin, wife of biologist Matthew Meselson, summarized the controversy:

The entire experimental legacy is dismaying, from the hundreds of dead monkeys at Fort Detrick to the spectacle of Seventh Day Adventist soldiers, the vaccinated volunteers in Project Whitecoat, strapped to chairs amid cages of animals in the Utah sunlight as Q fever aerosols are blown over them. Most chilling are the mock scenarios played out in urban areas: light bulbs filled with simulated BW agents being dropped in New York subways, men in Washington National Airport spraying pseudo-BW from briefcases, and similar tests in California and Texas and over the Florida Keys.

The Nixon administration felt an urgent need to respond to the growing negative perception of biological weapons. The realization that biological weapons may become the poor man's atom bomb also contributed to the end of the U.S. biological weapons program. Subsequently, President Nixon announced that the U.S. was unilaterally renouncing its biological warfare program, ultimately signing the Biological and Toxin Weapons Convention in 1972.

=== End of the program (1969–1973) ===
President Richard M. Nixon issued his "Statement on Chemical and Biological Defense Policies and Programs" on November 25, 1969, in a speech from Fort Detrick. The statement officially ended all U.S. offensive biological weapons programs. Nixon noted that biological weapons were unreliable and stated:

The United States shall renounce the use of lethal biological agents and weapons, and all other methods of biological warfare. The United States will confine its biological research to defensive measures such as immunization and safety measures.

In his speech Nixon called his move "unprecedented"; and it was in fact the first review of the U.S. biological warfare program since 1954. Despite the lack of review, the biological warfare program had increased in cost and size since 1961. From the onset of the U.S. biological weapons program in 1943 through the end of World War II the United States spent $400 million on biological weapons, mostly on research and development. The budget for fiscal year 1966 was $38 million. When Nixon ended the program the budget was $300 million annually. Nixon's statement confined all biological weapons research to defensive-only and ordered the destruction of the existing U.S. biological arsenal.

U.S. biological weapons stocks were destroyed over the next few years. A $12 million disposal plan was undertaken at Pine Bluff Arsenal, where all U.S. anti-personnel biological agents were stored. That plan was completed in May 1972 and included decontamination of facilities at Pine Bluff. Other agents, including anti-crop agents such as wheat stem rust, were stored at Beale Air Force Base and Rocky Mountain Arsenal. These anti-crop agents, along with agents at Fort Detrick used for research purposes were destroyed in March 1973.

== Geneva Protocol and BWC ==
The 1925 Geneva Protocol, ratified by most major powers in the 1920s and 30s, had still not been ratified by the United States at the dawn of World War II. Among the Protocol's provisions was a ban on bacteriological warfare. The Geneva Protocol had encountered opposition in the U.S. Senate, in part due to strong lobbying against it by the Chemical Warfare Service, and it was never brought to the floor for a vote when originally introduced. Regardless, on June 8, 1943, President Roosevelt affirmed a no-first-use policy for the United States concerning biological weapons. Even with Roosevelt's declaration opposition to the Protocol remained strong; in 1949 the Protocol was among several old treaties returned to President Harry S. Truman unratified.

When Nixon ended the U.S. bio-weapons program in 1969 he also announced that he would resubmit the Geneva Protocol to the U.S. Senate. This was a move Nixon was considering as early as July 1969. The announcement included language that indicated the Nixon administration was moving toward an international agreement on an outright ban on bio-weapons. Thus, the Nixon administration became the world's leading anti-biological weapons voice calling for an international treaty. The Eighteen Nation Disarmament Committee was discussing a British draft of a biological weapons treaty which the United Nations General Assembly approved in 1968 and that NATO supported. These arms control talks would eventually lead to the Biological Weapons Convention, the international treaty outlawing biological warfare. Prior to the Nixon announcement only Canada supported the British draft. Beginning in 1972, the Soviet Union, United States and more than 100 other countries signed the BWC. The United States ratified the Geneva Protocol in 1975.

== Agents studied and weaponized ==
When the U.S. biological warfare program ended in 1969 it had developed six mass-produced, battle-ready biological weapons in the form of agents that cause anthrax, tularemia, brucellosis, Q-fever, Venezuelan equine encephalitis virus, and botulism. In addition staphylococcal enterotoxin B was produced as an incapacitating agent. In addition to the agents that were ready to be used, the U.S. program conducted research into the weaponization of more than 20 other agents. They included: smallpox, EEE and WEE, AHF, Hantavirus, BHF, Lassa fever, melioidosis, plague, yellow fever, psittacosis, typhus, dengue fever, Rift Valley fever (RVF), CHIKV, late blight of potato, rinderpest, Newcastle disease, bird flu, and the toxin ricin.

Besides the numerous pathogens that afflict human beings, the U.S. had developed an arsenal of anti-agriculture biological agents. These included rye stem rust spores (stored at Edgewood Arsenal, 1951–1957), wheat stem rust spores (stored at the same facility 1962–1969), and the causative agent of rice blast (stored at Fort Detrick 1965–1966).

A U.S. facility at Fort Terry focused primarily on anti-animal biological agents. The first agent that was a candidate for development was foot and mouth disease (FMD). Besides FMD, five other top-secret biological weapons projects were commissioned on Plum Island. The other four programs researched included RVF, rinderpest, African swine fever, plus eleven miscellaneous exotic animal diseases. The eleven miscellaneous pathogens were: Blue tongue virus, bovine influenza, bovine virus diarrhea (BVD), fowl plague, goat pneumonitis, mycobacteria, "N" virus, Newcastle disease, sheep pox, Teschers disease, and vesicular stomatitis.

Work on delivery systems for the U.S. bioweapons arsenal led to the first mass-produced biological weapon in 1952, the M33 cluster bomb. The M33's sub-munition, the pipe-bomb-like cylindrical M114 bomb, was also completed and battle-ready by 1952. Other delivery systems researched and at least partially developed during the 1950s included the E77 balloon bomb and the E86 cluster bomb. The peak of U.S. biological weapons delivery system development came during the 1960s. Production of cluster bomb submunitions began to shift from cylindrical to spherical bomblets, which had a larger coverage area. Development of the spherical E120 bomblet took place in the early 1960s as did development of the M143 bomblet, similar to the chemical M139 bomblet. The experimental Flettner rotor bomblet was also developed during this time period. The Flettner rotor was called, "probably one of the better devices for disseminating microorganisms", by William C. Patrick III.

== Alleged uses ==
=== Korean War ===
In 1952, during the Korean War, the Chinese and North Koreans insinuated that mysterious outbreaks of disease in North Korea and China were due to U.S. biological attacks. Despite contrary assertions from the International Red Cross and World Health Organization, whom the Chinese denounced as being dominated by US influence and thus biased, the Chinese government pursued an investigation by the World Peace Council. A committee led by Joseph Needham gathered evidence for a report that included testimony from eyewitnesses, doctors, and four American Korean War prisoners who confirmed use of biological weapons by the U.S. In eastern Europe, China, and North Korea it was widely believed that the accusations were true. A 1988 book Korea: The Unknown War, by Western historians Jon Halliday and Bruce Cumings, also suggested the claims might be true.

In 1998, Canadian researchers and historians Stephen Endicott and Edward Hagerman of York University made the case that the accusations were true in their book, The United States and Biological Warfare: Secrets from the Early Cold War and Korea. The book received mostly positive reviews. A negative review called it "bad history" and "appalling", while other positive reviews praised the authors, "Endicott and Hagerman is far and away the most authoritative work on the subject" and "the most impressive, expertly researched and, as far as the official files allow, the best-documented case for the prosecution yet made". In the same year Endicott's book was published, Kathryn Weathersby and Milton Leitenberg of the Cold War International History Project at the Woodrow Wilson Center in Washington released a cache of Soviet and Chinese documents that revealed that the biowarfare allegation was an elaborate disinformation campaign by the communists. In addition, a Japanese journalist stated that he saw similar evidence of a Soviet disinformation campaign and that the evidence supporting its occurrence was faked. In 2001, anti-communist historian Herbert Romerstein supported Weathersby and Leitenberg, criticizing Endicott's research for using evidence provided by the Chinese government. Investigative journalist Simon Winchester concluded in 2008 that Soviet intelligence was sceptical of the allegation, but that North Korean leader Kim Il Sung believed the allegation.

In March 2010, the allegations were investigated by the Al Jazeera English news program People & Power. In this program, Professor Mori Masataka investigated historical artifacts in the form of bomb casings from US biological weapons, contemporary documentary evidence and eyewitness testimonies. He concluded that the United States did, in fact, test biological weapons on North Korea during the Korean War.

In September 2020, U.S. author Jeffrey Kaye published a set of declassified CIA communications reports (COMINT) that documented the responses of military units for the Korean People's Army and the Chinese People's Volunteer Army as they were apparently under attack by biological weapons, particularly the dropping of bacteria-laden insects. Some of these COMINT reports were also published a few months previously in Nicholson Baker's book, Baseless. One report from an identified Chinese military unit on February 26, 1952, said, "yesterday it was discovered that in our bivouac area there was a real flood of bacteria and germs from a plane by the enemy. Please supply us immediately with an issue of DDT that we may combat this menace, stop the spread of this plague, and eliminate all bacteria." In another example, on March 6, 1952, the 23rd Brigade of the Korean People's Army sent a "long detailed ... message to one of its subordinate battalions" suggesting preventive measures be taken against "bacteria" dropped by UN aircraft, apparently in the area around Sariwon. The report stated that "three persons ... became suddenly feverish", presumably in their unit. Their nervous systems were said to have become "benumbed".

=== Cuba ===
It has been rumored that the U.S. employed biological weapons against the Communist island nation of Cuba. Noam Chomsky claimed that evidence exists implicating the U.S. in biological warfare in Cuba. These claims are disputed.

Allegations in 1962 held that CIA operatives had contaminated a shipment of sugar while it was in storage in Cuba. Also in 1962, a Canadian agricultural technician assisting the Cuban government claimed he was paid $5,000 to infect Cuban turkeys with the deadly Newcastle disease. Though the technician later claimed he had just pocketed the money, many Cubans and some US citizens believed a clandestinely administered biological weapons agent was responsible for a subsequent outbreak of the disease in Cuban turkeys.

In 1971 the first serious outbreak of African Swine Fever in the Western Hemisphere occurred in Cuba. The Cuban government alleged that U.S. covert biological warfare was responsible for this outbreak, which led to the preemptive slaughter of 500,000 pigs. The outbreak was labeled the "most alarming event" of 1971 by the United Nations Food and Agricultural Organization. Six years after the event, the newspaper Newsday, citing an anonymous former CIA agent, claimed that anti-Castro saboteurs with at least the tacit backing of U.S. Central Intelligence Agency officials introduced African swine fever virus into Cuba six weeks before the outbreak in 1971 to destabilize the Cuban economy and encourage domestic opposition to Fidel Castro. According to the Newsday report, the virus was allegedly delivered to the operatives from an army base in the Panama Canal Zone by an unnamed U.S. intelligence source. Evidence linking these incidents to biological warfare has not been confirmed, however, according to Kieth Bolender, a French scientist analyzing the situation concluded that it was not possible that the outbreak had occurred naturally.

Accusations have continued to come out of Havana alleging continued U.S. use of bio-weapons on the island after the official end of the U.S. biological weapons program in 1973. The Cuban government blamed the U.S. for a 1981 outbreak of dengue fever that sickened more than 300,000. Dengue is a vector-borne disease usually carried by mosquitoes, the same species of yellow-fever mosquitoes (Aedes aegypti) utilized in Operation Big Buzz in 1955. Dengue 2 killed 158 people that year in Cuba, including 101 children under 15. Hemorrhagic Dengue 2 had not appeared in the Caribbean until this point and the two closest islands, Jamaica and Bahamas, reported no cases during this time. According to Ariel Alonso Pérez, the fever appeared simultaneously in three separate areas (Havana, Cienfuegos, and Camagüey) hundreds of miles apart and that examination of visitors from areas known to have Dengue found that none had brought the virus with them and none of the original victims had made contact with foreigners or exited the country. Tensions between the two countries, coupled with confirmed U.S. research into entomological warfare during the 1950s, made these charges seem not implausible to some scientists and historians.

Since July 1981, Cuba has had widespread sugar cane rust, African Swine Fever, tobacco blue mold, Dengue 2, meningitis, hemorrhagic conjunctivitis, and several parasites targeting staple crops such as rice, corn, and potatoes. None of these had been present in the region before 1960.

== Experimentation and testing ==
=== Entomological testing ===
The United States seriously researched the potential of entomological warfare (EW) during the Cold War. EW is a specific type of biological warfare which aims to use insects as weapon, either directly or through their potential to act as vectors. During the 1950s the United States conducted a series of field tests using entomological weapons. Operation Big Itch, in 1954, was designed to test munitions loaded with uninfected fleas (Xenopsylla cheopis). In May 1955 over 300,000 yellow fever mosquitoes (Aedes aegypti) were dropped over parts of the U.S. state of Georgia to determine if the air-dropped mosquitoes could survive to take meals from humans. The mosquito tests were known as Operation Big Buzz. The U.S. engaged in at least two other EW testing programs, Operation Drop Kick and Operation May Day. A 1981 Army report outlined these tests as well as multiple cost-associated issues that occurred with EW.

=== Clinical trials ===
Operation Whitecoat involved the controlled testing of many serious agents on military personnel who had consented to experimentation, and who understood the risks involved. No deaths are known to have resulted from this program.

=== Vulnerability field tests ===
==== In military venues ====
In August 1949 a U.S. Army Special Operations Division, operating out of Fort Detrick in Maryland, set up its first test at The Pentagon in Washington, D.C. Operatives sprayed harmless bacteria into the building's air conditioning system and observed as the microbes spread throughout the Pentagon.

The U.S. military acknowledges that it tested several chemical and biological weapons on US military personnel in the desert facility, including the East Demilitarization Area near Deseret Chemical Depot/Deseret Chemical Test Center at Fort Douglas, Utah, but takes the position that the tests have contributed to long-term illnesses in only a handful of exposed personnel. Veterans who took part believe they were also exposed to Agent Orange. The Department of Veterans Affairs denies almost all claims for care and compensation made by veterans who believe they got sick as a result of the tests. The U.S. military for decades remained silent about "Project 112" and its victims, a slew of tests overseen by the Army's Deseret Test Center in Salt Lake City. Project 112 starting in the 1960s tested chemical and biological agents, including VX, sarin and E. coli, on military personnel who did not know they were being tested. After the Defense Department finally acknowledged conducting the tests on unwitting human subjects, it agreed to help the Veterans' Affairs Department track down those who were exposed, but a Government Accountability Office report in 2008 scolded the military for ceasing the effort.

==== In civilian venues ====
Between 1941 and the mid-1960s, some medical experiments were conducted on a large scale on civilians who had not consented to participate. Often, these experiments took place in urban areas in order to test dispersion methods. Questions were raised about detrimental health effects after experiments in San Francisco, California, were followed by a spike in hospital visits. The San Francisco test involved a U.S. Navy ship that in 1951 sprayed Serratia marcescens from the bay; it traveled more than 30 miles. In 1977, however, the Centers for Disease Control and Prevention reported that there was no association between the testing and the occurrence of pneumonia or influenza.

Scientists tested biological agents, including Bacillus globigii, which were thought to be harmless, at public places such as subways. Light bulbs containing Bacillus globigii were dropped in New York City's subway system; the result was strong enough to affect people prone to illness (also known as Subway Experiment). Based on the circulation measurements, thousands of people would have been killed if a dangerous microbe was released in the same manner. Another dispersion test involved laboratory personnel disguised as passengers spraying harmless bacteria in Washington National Airport.

A jet aircraft released material over Victoria, Texas, that was monitored in the Florida Keys.

=== GAO Report ===
In February 2008, the Government Accountability Office (GAO) released report GAO-08-366 titled, "Chemical and Biological Defense, DOD and VA Need to Improve Efforts to Identify and Notify Individuals Potentially Exposed during Chemical and Biological Tests." The report stated that tens of thousands of military personnel and civilians may have been exposed to biological and chemical substances through DOD tests. In 2003, the DOD reported it had identified 5,842 military personnel and estimated 350 civilians as being potentially exposed during the testing, known as Project 112.

The GAO scolded the U.S. Department of Defense's (DOD) 2003 decision to stop searching for people affected by the tests as premature. The GAO report also found that the DoD made no effort to inform civilians of exposure, and that the United States Department of Veterans Affairs (VA) is failing to use available resources to inform veterans of possible exposure or to determine if they were deceased. After the DoD halted efforts to find those who may have been affected by the tests, veteran health activists and others identified approximately 600 additional individuals who were potentially exposed during Project 112. Some of the individuals were identified after the GAO reviewed records stored at the Dugway Proving Ground, others were identified by the Institute of Medicine. Many of the newly identified suffer from long-term illnesses that may have been caused by the biological or chemical testing.

== Current (post-1969) bio-defense program ==
Both the U.S. bio-weapons ban and the Biological Weapons Convention restricted any work in the area of biological warfare to defensive in nature. In reality, this gives BWC member-states wide latitude to conduct biological weapons research because the BWC contains no provisions for monitoring or enforcement. The treaty, essentially, is a gentlemen's agreement amongst members backed by the long-prevailing thought that biological warfare should not be used in battle.

After Nixon declared an end to the U.S. bio-weapons program, debate in the Army centered around whether or not toxin weapons were included in the president's declaration. Following Nixon's November 1969 order, scientists at Fort Detrick worked on one toxin, Staphylococcus enterotoxin type B (SEB), for several more months. Nixon ended the debate when he added toxins to the bio-weapons ban in February 1970. The U.S. also ran a series of experiments with anthrax, code named Project Bacchus, Project Clear Vision and Project Jefferson in the late 1990s and early 2000s.

In recent years certain critics have claimed the U.S. stance on biological warfare and the use of biological agents has differed from historical interpretations of the BWC. For example, it is said that the U.S. now maintains that the Article I of the BWC (which explicitly bans bio-weapons), does not apply to "non-lethal" biological agents. Previous interpretation was stated to be in line with a definition laid out in Public Law 101-298, the Biological Weapons Anti-Terrorism Act of 1989. That law defined a biological agent as:

any micro-organism, virus, infectious substance, or biological product that may be engineered as a result of biotechnology, or any naturally occurring or bioengineered component of any such microorganism, virus, infectious substance, or biological product, capable of causing death, disease, or other biological malfunction in a human, an animal, a plant, or another living organism; deterioration of food, water, equipment, supplies, or material of any kind ...

According to the Federation of American Scientists, U.S. work on non-lethal agents exceeds limitations in the BWC.

During the 2022 Russian invasion of Ukraine, the Russians claimed that they had come across "US military-run biolabs in Ukraine" supposedly developing biological weapons. The Ukraine biolabs conspiracy theory was rejected as without evidence by the US, Ukraine, the United Nations, Russian scientists, and Reuters. who stated the labs are performing public health research. The US dismissed the allegations as propaganda and disinformation, stating the labs focused on preventing the outbreak of infectious diseases and developing vaccines. The laboratories were first established following the Nunn–Lugar Cooperative Threat Reduction to secure and dismantle the remnants of the Soviet biological weapons program, and since then have been used to monitor and prevent new epidemics. The laboratories are publicly listed, not secret, and are operated by their own countries, such as Ukraine, not by the US. According to PolitiFact, as part of a continuation of international agreements to reduce biological threats, the Department of Defense does provide "technical support to the Ukrainian Ministry of Health since 2005 to improve public health laboratories," but does not control or provide personnel to the public health facilities.

According to the 2008 report by the U.S. Congressional Research Service, "Developments in biotechnology, including genetic engineering, may produce a wide variety of live agents and toxins that are difficult to detect and counter; and new chemical warfare agents and mixtures of chemical weapons and biowarfare agents are being developed... Countries are using the natural overlap between weapons and civilian applications of chemical and biological materials to conceal chemical weapon and bioweapon production."

== See also ==
- History of biological warfare
- Human experimentation in the United States
- Iraqi biological weapons program
- Operation Sea-Spray
- Frank Olson
- Project SHAD
- Soviet biological weapons program
- United States Army Biological Warfare Laboratories
- United States and weapons of mass destruction
- United States chemical weapons program
- Allegations of biological warfare in the Korean War
- 2001 anthrax attacks
