= M143 (disambiguation) =

M143 or M-143 may refer to:

- M143 bomblet, a biological cluster bomb sub-munition developed by the United States during the 1960s
- M-143 (Michigan highway), a highway in south central Michigan, U.S
- Malaysia Federal Route 143
- M143 Mercedes-Benz engine
- M143 Air Data Subsystem on the AH1-F variant of the Bell AH-1 Cobra helicopter
- M-143 variant of the Tupolev Tu-143 Soviet unmanned reconnaissance aircraft
- M-143 pipeline of the Rincon Oil Field, southern California, U.S.
