= Anthrax weaponization =

Development and deployment of Bacillus anthracis (anthrax) as a biological weapon

Anthrax weaponization is the development and deployment of the bacterium Bacillus anthracis or, more commonly, its spore (referred to as anthrax), as a biological weapon. As a biological weapon, anthrax has been used in biowarfare and bioterrorism since 1914. However, in 1975, the Biological Weapons Convention prohibited the "development, production and stockpiling" of biological weapons. It has since been used in bioterrorism.

Anthrax spores can cause infection from inhalation, skin contact, ingestion or injection and when untreated can lead to death. Likely delivery methods of weaponized anthrax include aerial dispersal or dispersal through livestock. Notable bioterrorism uses include the 2001 anthrax attacks and an incident in 1993 by the Aum Shinrikyo group in Japan.

== Biological overview ==
Concentrated anthrax spores, and not necessarily the bacterium Bacillus anthracis, pose the biggest risk as a biological weapons to humans. When airborne, anthrax spores are not easily detectable, and are several microns in diameter. They are able to reach deep into the lungs when inhaled. Once the spores are in the lungs they are then able to replicate in blood, travel to the lymph nodes, and produce toxins which lead to death. Post exposure symptoms resemble flu-like illness followed by a fulminant phase of severe acute respiratory distress, shock and, ultimately death.

== Potential threats ==
Anthrax spores are able to be dispersed via multiple methods and infect humans with ease. The symptoms present as a common cold or flu, and may take weeks before appearing. The destructive effects of an anthrax attack on a large city may have the destructive capacity of a nuclear weapon.

=== Population ===
A mathematical model of a simulated large-scale airborne anthrax attack in a large city (1 kg anthrax spores in a city of 10 million people) was created, which takes into account the dispersion of spores, the age-dependent dose-response, the dynamics of disease progression and the timing and organization of medical intervention. The results of this model with the most efficient medical response resulted in more than 100000 deaths, which increases by a factor of 7 with slower antibiotic distribution.

=== Economy ===
Outside of the initial threat to individuals there are the costs of economic disruption, decontamination and treatment from such an event. The economic costs of the 2001 anthrax attacks resulted in over 100 million dollars being spent to decontaminate postal plants. The contamination is thought to have been less than 1 gram of anthrax spores in the facilities. The cost to decontaminate the Hart Senate Office Building after the 2001 anthrax attacks cost approximately 23 million dollars, with approximately 2 grams of anthrax spores present.

== Containment treatment and avoidance ==
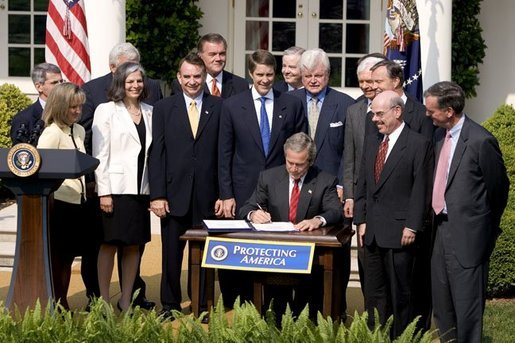
President George W. Bush Signs Project Bioshield Act

Detection of airborne anthrax requires 24–48 hours. Rapid detection in the atmosphere is not yet technologically effective. The system put in place on 22 January 2003 to assist in detecting an airborne anthrax attack by the United States is the U.S. Bio-watch Surveillance Network, which is able to detect airborne anthrax within 24–48 hours, however with some false positives and false negatives, leading to severe lag in detection and critical time lost for prevention and treatment.

Vaccination to anthrax is available, requiring 6 shots over an 18-month period and annual booster shots for full immunity. Vaccination of military personnel and first responders is vital to sustain a post attack response. The complete vaccination of an entire population can be achieved over a period of years, resulting in the reduction of risk from anthrax comparable to the reduction of risk of nuclear weapons by anti-ballistic missile systems.

Once exposure occurs and before the fulminant stage, antibiotic treatment of ciprofloxacin 400 mg or doxycycline 100 mg intravenously twice daily as well as two other antibiotics (clindamycin, vancomycin, imipenem, meropenem, chloramphenicol, penicillin, rifampicin, clarithromycin) and close clinical observation for a 60-100 day period is recommended.

== Methods of dispersal ==
=== Aerial ===
The passive dispersal of anthrax spores aerially has occurred from rooftops (Aum Shinrikyo), from aircraft (Operation Cherry Blossoms at Night) or potentially, as suggested in 2002, by United States' President George W. Bush, "a small container and one terrorist."

=== Missile ===
An intercontinental ballistic missile warhead containing anthrax may be able to effectively disperse anthrax spores. North Korea is believed to be conducting tests on anthrax filled warheads which may be deployed on Hwasong-15 missiles, which could be used to contaminate areas, such as military bases, in a time of war for periods of months. The concerns of reentry temperatures and pressure of the anthrax filled warhead are able to be overcome by thermal insulation of the payload.

=== Bomb ===
Similar to a warhead, an anthrax filled bomb, such as the E61 Anthrax Bomblet or other N-bomb cluster munition filled with anthrax spores could allow an area to be contaminated for months, or decades. In the case of Gruinard Island testing N-bomb cluster munition containing anthrax spores contaminated the island from 1942 until a decontamination effort in 1986.

=== Livestock ===
Anthrax spores are not only able to be used as a weapon to directly infect humans. They are also able to target livestock, which may lead to transmission of anthrax between both animals and humans. This method may use another mechanism to infect livestock, where inevitably the livestock become a mechanism to disperse anthrax themselves and also result in the loss of the livestock. However, it can also be achieved with direct feeding, such as the "cattle cakes" containing anthrax spores, which were kept on hand by the Royal Air Force for aerial dispersal during the second World War. This was to be used in retaliation to any biological warfare by Nazi Germany.

==== 1978–1984 Rhodesian anthrax epidemic ====
The largest anthrax epidemic in the last 200 years occurred in Rhodesia (now Zimbabwe) in the 1980s, where there may be evidence of deliberate anthrax releases by Rhodesian and South African forces, and is the progenitor of South Africa's biological weapons program (Project Coast). This epidemic is responsible for 10738 cattle and 200 human fatalities.

== History of diplomacy ==
=== 1925 Geneva Protocol ===
As a response to the biological and chemical atrocities of the First World War, the Geneva Protocol was created. This prevented "Asphyxiating, Poisonous, or other Gasses or Bacteriological Methods of Warfare" being used. However this treaty did not prohibit the production or the research of biological agents - amendments were made to allow the use of biological weapons in retaliation.

=== 1969 Nixon terminates United States biological weapons program ===
An executive order by United States president Richard Nixon in 1969 terminated the United States' biological weapons program. This led to the destruction of the biological weapons arsenal and the termination of research and production of biological weapons. This change lead to increased resources for the research and creation of methods such as "vaccines, treatments and diagnostic tests", to defend against biological weapons.

=== 1972–1975 Biological Weapons Convention ===
Participation in the Biological Weapons Convention Signed and ratified Acceded or succeeded Unrecognized state, abiding by treaty Only signed Non-signatory

The Biological Weapons Convention is a treaty that prohibits the "Development, Production and Stockpiling of Biological and Toxin Weapons" and the destruction of those which were already in existence, including anthrax. This treaty was created based on proposals by Great Britain and the Warsaw Pact nations, where it was ratified in April 1972 and went into force in 1975. Over 100 nations signed the treaty, including the Soviet Union, the United Kingdom, the United States of America, Brazil and Iraq.

== History of use and development ==
=== 1914–1918 First use as an act of aggression ===
During the first World War, evidence suggests that the German army used anthrax to infect the livestock of Allied Nations, resulting in the death of many livestock intended for trade between allied forces.

=== 1932–1945 Japanese testing and attacks ===
In 1932 Japan tested anthrax as a weapon by infecting prisoners held in Manchuria as a part of Japan's biological weapons program "Operation Cherry Blossoms at Night". During this program the Japanese used aircraft to attack at least 11 Chinese cities by spraying homes directly with anthrax.

=== 1942 International biological weapons Programs ===
As a response to possible attacks from Germany, the United States, Great Britain and Canada started biological weapons programs. Experimentation of these bombs occurred in Mississippi, Utah and Gruinard Island in Scotland.

==== Gruinard Island ====
In 1942 and 1943 n-bomb cluster munition, containing anthrax spores were detonated over Gruinard Island, as a joint research program between the United States, Canada and Great Britain. 80 sheep were placed on the island prior to the dispersal of aerosol anthrax; all of them died. More interest in Gruinard Island came in the early 1980s when a survey discovered that there was still anthrax contamination in the environment, showing the long term effects of anthrax use as a biological weapon. In 1986 Great Britain decontaminated the island with a mixture of formaldehyde and seawater, and was passed as safe by a group of scientists led by the secretary of the Agricultural and Food Research Council in 1988 after 40 sheep were raised on the island for several months without symptoms of anthrax infection.

==== Vigo Ordnance Plant ====
In 1944, the US converted the Vigo Ordnance Plant, Terre Haute, Indiana, to mass produce biological agents for the U.S. bio-weapons program. Specifically, the intention was to use the plant to produce anthrax bombs at industrial scale. Although the Vigo plant never actually produced bio-weapons before the end of World War II, based on preliminary studies performed at Camp Detrick (now Fort Detrick), it did produce 8000 pounds of the anthrax simulant, Bacillus atrophaeus (then termed Bacillus globigii), which was used in weapons development testing.

=== 1950 United States biological weapons program expansion ===
Programs were expanded during the Korean War in order to protect US troops against biological agents, where a program was added for the development of vaccines and other treatments.

=== 1979 Accidental outbreak in Sverdlovsk USSR ===
In April and May 1979 in the city of Sverdlovsk (population of 1.2 million), an anthrax outbreak was reported. 96 cases of anthrax infection were reported where 79 were gastrointestinal anthrax and 17 were cutaneous, of these cases 64 out of the 96 infected people died in a period of weeks. Soviet reports in 1979 denied the manufacture of biological weapons and reported that the anthrax outbreak originated from livestock, but in 1992 it was confirmed by the president of Russia, Boris Yeltsin, that the outbreak originated from a Soviet military microbiological facility within 4 kilometers of the city, and occurred from improper installation of air filters at the facility.

=== 1993 Aum Shinrikyo unsuccessful attempt in Tokyo ===
1993 the Aum Shinrikyo cult released anthrax spores from the roof of an eight-story building in downtown Tokyo. Upon investigation, the spores used were from the 'Sterne strain' of anthrax, which is an attenuated bacterium that is used to vaccinate animals.

=== 1995 Iraq biological weapons program ===
In 1995 UNSCOM inspectors discovered that Iraq had a biological warfare program, despite an agreement ending the Gulf War in 1991, that all programs involving weapons of mass destruction are accounted for and ended.

In July 1995 documents were confirmed by defectors who ran Iraq's biological warfare program; that the biological weapons program produced a large variety of biological weapons, including anthrax, which was able to be delivered by missiles, bombs and aerosols. It was also discovered that there was an arsenal of these weapons in 1991.

=== 2001 Anthrax letters ===
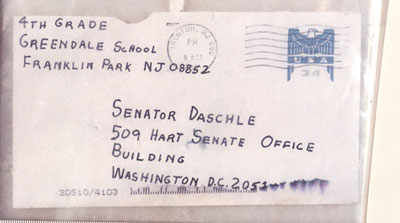
Envelope containing anthrax spores, sent to South Dakota Senator Tom Daschle, from the 2001 Anthrax attacks.

After the attacks of September 11 on the United States, letters were delivered to two U.S. Senators' offices and several media agencies containing a powdered form of anthrax. The process of delivering these letters led to the postal facilities and buildings that they passed through being contaminated.

The powdered anthrax was able to disperse into the air without being detected and eventually inhaled. 43 people tested positive to anthrax exposure and 22 cases of anthrax illness were diagnosed, where 11 were inhalation anthrax and 11 were cutaneous anthrax. Five people from this group died.

== See also ==
- Smallpox
- Plague
- Botulism
- Viral hemorrhagic fever
