= The Unparalleled Invasion =

1910 short story by Jack London

- Short story by Jack London
- Country: United States
- Language: English
- Genre: Short story

Publication
- Published in: McClure's
- Publication type: Magazine
- Publication date: 1910

"The Unparalleled Invasion" is a science fiction story written by American author Jack London. It was first published in McClure's in 1910.

== Plot summary ==
Under the influence of Japan, China modernizes and undergoes its own version of the Meiji Reforms in the 1910s. In 1922, China breaks away from Japan and fights a brief war that culminates in the Chinese annexation of the Japanese possessions of Korea, Formosa, and Manchuria. Enraged over the loss of Indochina to Chinese migrants and invading armies, France attempts to blockade China, but is thwarted by China's economic self-sufficiency. In a last-ditch attempt, France assembles a large military force to invade China, but the entire force is quickly defeated by China's vast army. Over the next half century, China's population steadily grows, and eventually migration overwhelms every other European colony in Asia.

By 1975, the population of China is double that of the Western world combined, and China's government is confident that the nation's high birth rate and population will result in Chinese world domination. The United States enlists the help of other Western powers and amasses an invasion force on China's borders. America then launches a biological warfare campaign against China, resulting in the total destruction of China's population, with the few survivors of the plague being killed out of hand by European and American troops. Some German soldiers are exposed to "a sort of hybridization between plague-germs" in China and are studied by German scientists, but the infection is safely kept from spreading. China is then colonized by the Western powers, opening the way to a joyous epoch of "splendid mechanical, intellectual, and art output". In the 1980s, war clouds once more gather between Germany and France over Alsace–Lorraine. The story ends with the nations of the world solemnly pledging not to use the same techniques that they had used against China.

== Background and context ==
London wrote the story in 1907 and it was published in McClure's in 1910

== Analysis ==
"The Unparalleled Invasion" was included in The Strength of the Strong, a collection of stories by London published by Macmillan in 1914, which also included "The Dream of Debs", a critique of capitalist society in the US, and "The Strength of the Strong", which used a primitive background as metaphor of social injustice among men.

Many academics take the text at face value. "The Unparalleled Invasion" has been used to support claims of racism in London's work. Academics pointed out that the premise, themes, and even some passages were borrowed directly from London's 1904 "Yellow Peril" essay, where London warns that "the menace to the Western World lies, not in the [Japanese] little brown man, but in the four hundred millions of [Chinese] yellow men". Academic H. Bruce Franklin described the story as celebrating superweapons and the genocide of Asians.

However, other academics have also claimed that this story is a "strident warning against race hatred and its paranoia", due to its focus on the danger posed to China by the West. Some academics argue that the story represents a warning of what happens when racial hatred is allowed to develop or an ironic criticism of imperialism. The story has also been viewed as a prescient political prediction of the rise of China as a world political power triggered in part by Japan's imperial aspirations.

== See also ==
- History of biological warfare
- Yellow Peril
