= Operation Polka Dot =

1950s US biological warfare test

Operation Polka Dot was a U.S. Army test of a biological cluster bomb during the early 1950s.

== Operation ==
Operation Polka Dot was a field test of the E133 cluster bomb undertaken at Dugway Proving Ground in Utah during the early 1950s. The operation was detailed in a July 18, 1955 U.S. Army report that also detailed Operation Trouble Maker. The operation was classified "secret" and involved filling the munitions with the biological agent simulant, Bacillus globigii.

== See also ==
- Operation Dew
- Operation LAC
