= E120 bomblet =

U.S. Cold War biological cluster bomb sub-munition

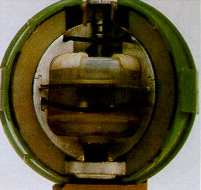
The E120 biological bomblet

The E120 bomblet was a biological cluster bomb sub-munition developed to disseminate a liquid biological agent. The E120 was developed by the United States in the early 1960s.

== History ==
The E120 bomblet was one of several biological weapons that were developed before the United States abandoned its offensive biological warfare program in 1969–1970. The E120 was developed in the early 1960s. The Schu S-4 strain of the tularemia bacterium was standardized as Agent UL for use in the E120 bomblet.

== Specifications ==
The E120 was a spherical bomblet with a diameter of 11.4 centimeters. It was designed to hold 0.1 kilograms of liquid biological agent. Much like the M139 bomblet, the E120 had exterior "vanes". However, the vanes' function on the E120 was to cause the bomblet to rotate as it fell, thus shattering and rolling around upon impact while spraying the agent from a nozzle.

== See also ==
- E14 munition
- E61 anthrax bomblet
- Flettner rotor bomblet
- M143 bomblet
