= Tularemia =

Infectious disease caused by bacteria

- Other names: Tularaemia, Pahvant Valley plague, rabbit fever, deer fly fever, Ohara's fever
- A tularemia lesion on the back of the right hand
- Specialty: Infectious disease
- Symptoms: Fever, skin ulcer, large lymph nodes
- Causes: bacterium Francisella tularensis (spread by ticks, deer flies, contact with infected animals)
- Diagnostic method: Blood tests, microbial culture
- Prevention: Insect repellent, wearing long pants, rapidly removing ticks, not disturbing dead animals
- Medication: Aminoglycosides (Streptomycin, Gentamicin), doxycycline, ciprofloxacin
- Prognosis: Generally good with treatment
- Frequency: ~200 cases per year (US)

Tularemia, also known as rabbit fever, is an infectious disease caused by the bacterium Francisella tularensis. Symptoms may include fever, skin ulcers, and enlarged lymph nodes. Occasionally, a form that results in pneumonia or a throat and nasal sinus infection may occur.

The bacterium is typically spread by ticks, deer flies, or contact with infected animals. It may also be spread by drinking contaminated water or breathing in contaminated dust. It does not spread directly between people. Diagnosis is by blood tests or cultures of the infected site.

Prevention includes the use of insect repellent and long pants, rapidly removing ticks, and not disturbing dead animals. Treatment is typically with the antibiotic streptomycin. Gentamicin, doxycycline, or ciprofloxacin may also be used.

Between the 1970s and 2015, around 200 cases were reported in the United States each year. Males are affected more often than females. It occurs most frequently in the young and the middle-aged. In the United States, most cases occur in the summer. The disease is named after Tulare County, California, where the disease was discovered in 1911. Several other animals, such as rabbits, may also be infected.

== Signs and symptoms ==
Depending on the site of infection, tularemia has six characteristic clinical variants: ulceroglandular (the most common type representing 75% of all forms), glandular, oropharyngeal, pneumonic, oculoglandular, and typhoidal.

The incubation period for tularemia is 1 to 14 days; most human infections become apparent after three to five days. In most susceptible mammals, the clinical signs include fever, lethargy, loss of appetite, signs of sepsis, and possibly death. Nonhuman mammals rarely develop the skin lesions seen in people. Subclinical infections are common, and animals often develop specific antibodies to the organism. Fever is moderate or very high, and tularemia bacilli can be isolated from blood cultures at this stage. The face and eyes redden and become inflamed. Inflammation spreads to the lymph nodes, which enlarge and may suppurate (mimicking bubonic plague). A high fever accompanies lymph node involvement.

== Cause ==
Tularemia is caused by the bacterium Francisella tularensis which is typically spread by ticks, deer flies, and contact with infected animals.

=== Bacteria ===
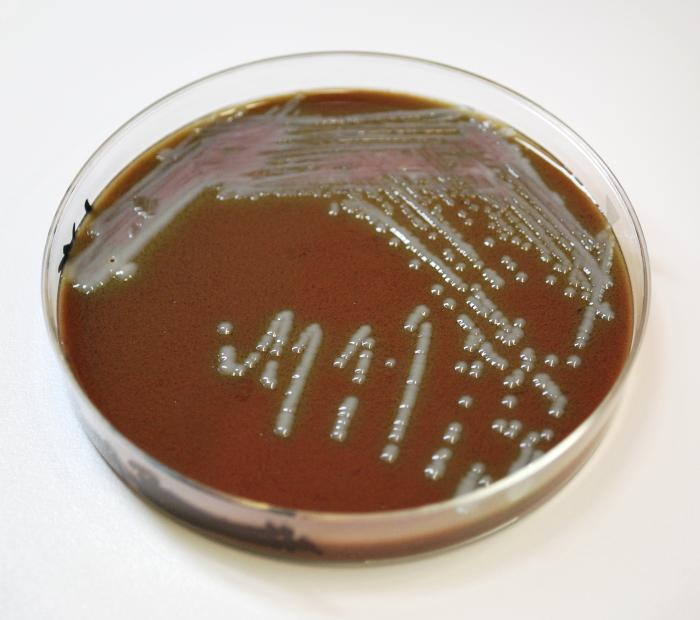
Chocolate agar culture showing Francisella tularensis colonies

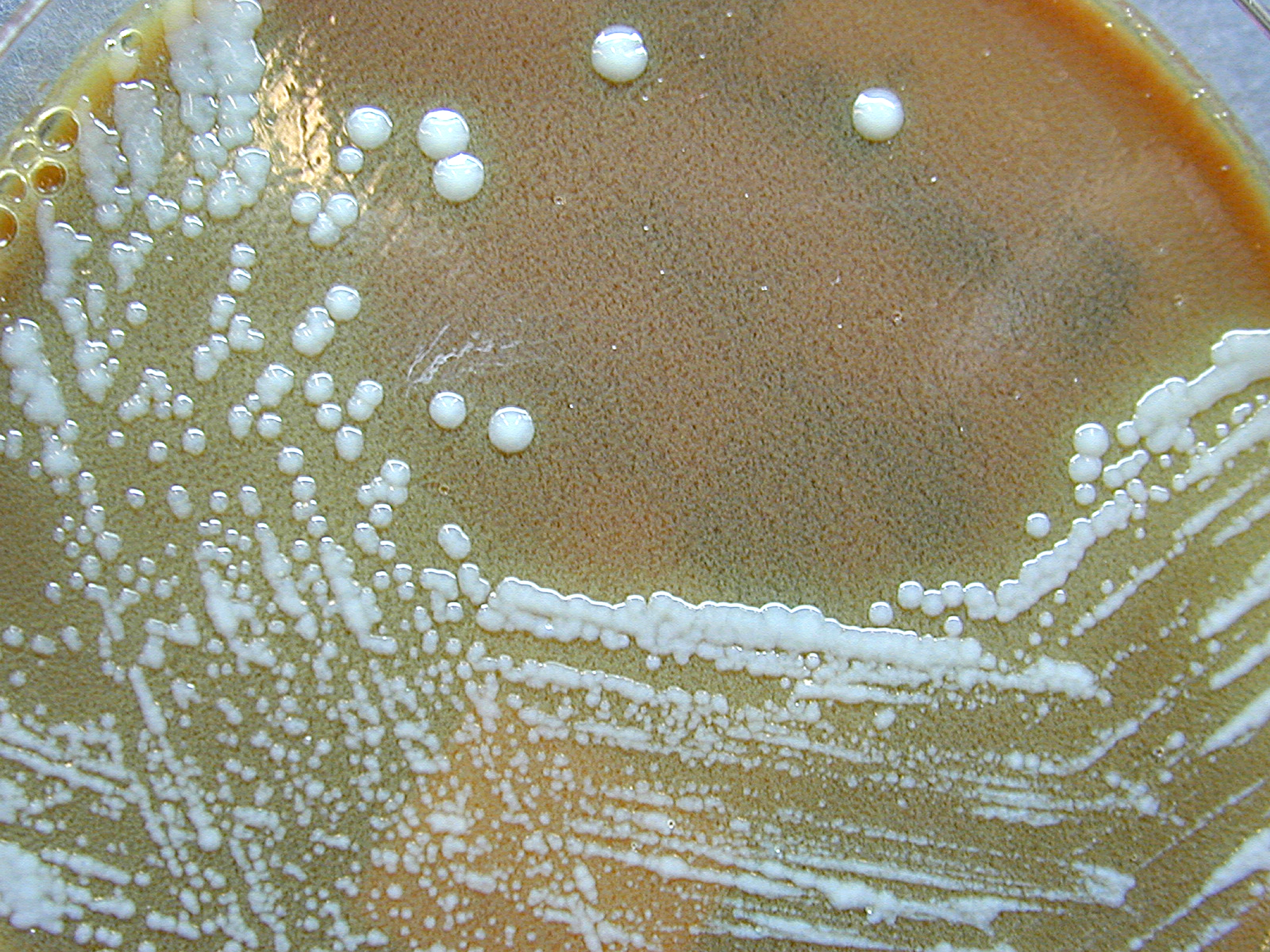
Another culture of Francisella tularensis

The bacteria can penetrate into the body through damaged skin, mucous membranes, and inhalation. Humans are most often infected by a tick/deer fly bite or through handling an infected animal. Ingesting infected water, soil, or food can also cause infection. Hunters are at a higher risk of this disease because of the potential of inhaling the bacteria during the skinning process. It has been contracted from inhaling particles from an infected rabbit ground up in a lawnmower (see below). Tularemia is not spread directly from person to person. Humans can also be infected through bioterrorism attempts.

Francisella tularensis can live both within and outside the cells of the animal it infects, meaning it is a facultative intracellular bacterium. It primarily infects macrophages, a type of white blood cell, and thus can evade the immune system. The course of disease involves the spread of the organism to multiple organ systems, including the lungs, liver, spleen, and lymphatic system. The course of the disease is different depending on the route of exposure. Mortality in untreated (before the antibiotic era) patients has been as high as 50% in the pneumonic and typhoidal forms of the disease, which, however, account for less than 10% of cases.

=== Spread ===
The most common way the disease is spread is via arthropod vectors. Ticks involved include Amblyomma, Dermacentor, Haemaphysalis, and Ixodes. Rodents, rabbits, and hares often serve as reservoir hosts, but waterborne infection accounts for 5–10% of all tularemia in the United States, including from aquatic animals such as seals. Tularemia can also be transmitted by biting flies, particularly the deer fly Chrysops discalis. Individual flies can remain infectious for 14 days and ticks for over two years. Tularemia may also be spread by direct contact with contaminated animals or material, by ingestion of poorly cooked flesh of infected animals or contaminated water, or by inhalation of contaminated dust.

== Diagnosis ==
=== Pathology ===
In lymph node biopsies, the typical histopathologic pattern is characterized by geographic areas of necrosis with neutrophils and necrotizing granulomas. The pattern is non-specific and similar to other infectious lymphadenopathies.

The laboratory isolation of F. tularensis requires special media such as buffered charcoal yeast extract agar. It cannot be isolated in the routine culture media because of its need for sulfhydryl group donors (such as cysteine). The microbiologist must be informed when tularemia is suspected, not only to include the special media for appropriate isolation, but also to ensure that safety precautions are taken to avoid contamination of laboratory personnel. Serological tests (detection of antibodies in the serum of the patients) are available and widely used. Cross reactivity with Brucella can confuse interpretation of the results, so diagnosis should not rely only on serology. Molecular methods such as PCR are available in reference laboratories.

== Prevention ==
There are no safe, available, approved vaccines against tularemia. However, vaccination research and development continue, with live attenuated vaccines being the most thoroughly researched and most likely candidate for approval. Sub-unit vaccine candidates, such as killed-whole cell vaccines, are also under investigation, however research has not reached a state of public use.

Optimal preventative practices include limiting direct exposure when handling potentially infected animals by wearing gloves and face masks (importantly, when skinning deceased animals). It is therefore crucial to alert the laboratory personnel when handling samples from patients suspected with tularemia. In addition, other preventive strategies include chlorination of drinking water, control of water sources and surveillance of surface waters, vectors and rodents.

== Treatment ==
If infection occurs or is suspected, treatment is generally with the antibiotics streptomycin or gentamicin. Doxycycline was previously used. Gentamicin may be easier to obtain than streptomycin. There is also tentative evidence to support the use of quinolone antibiotics. Combination therapy including gentamicin is recommended in case of severe infections.

== Prognosis ==
Since the discovery of antibiotics, the rate of death associated with tularemia has decreased from 60% to less than 4%.

== Epidemiology ==
Tularemia is most common in the Northern Hemisphere, including North America and parts of Europe and Asia. It occurs between 30° and 71° north latitude.

In the United States, although records show that tularemia was never particularly common, incidence rates continued to drop over the course of the 20th century. Between 1990 and 2000, the rate dropped to less than 1 per one million, meaning the disease is extremely rare in the United States today.

In Europe, tularemia is generally rare, though outbreaks with hundreds of cases occur every few years in neighboring Finland and Sweden. In Sweden over a period from 1984 to 2012 a total of 4,830 cases of tularemia occurred (most of the infections were acquired within the country). About 1.86 cases per 100,000 persons occur each year with higher rates in those between 55 and 70.

=== Outbreaks ===
In the 14th century BC, a disease believed to probably be Tularemia spread throughout the Hittite Empire, known as the Hittite plague, and its use in repelling an invasion was the first use of biological warfare recorded.

From May to October 2000, an outbreak of tularemia in Martha's Vineyard, Massachusetts, resulted in one fatality, and brought the interest of the United States Centers for Disease Control and Prevention (CDC) as a potential investigative ground for aerosolised Francisella tularensis. For a time, Martha's Vineyard was identified as the only place in the world where documented cases of tularemia resulted from lawn mowing. However, in May 2015 a resident of Lafayette, Colorado, died from aerosolised F. tularensis, which was also connected to lawn mowing, highlighting this new vector of risk.

An outbreak of tularemia occurred in Kosovo in 1999–2000.

In 2004, three researchers at Boston Medical Center, in Massachusetts, were accidentally infected with F. tularensis, after apparently failing to follow safety procedures.

In 2005, small amounts of F. tularensis were detected in the National Mall area of Washington, D.C., the morning after an antiwar demonstration on September 24, 2005. Biohazard sensors were triggered at six locations surrounding the Mall. While thousands of people were potentially exposed, no infections were reported. The detected bacteria likely originated from a natural source, not from a bioterror attempt.

In 2005, an outbreak occurred in Germany amongst participants in a hare hunt. About 27 people came into contact with contaminated blood and meat after the hunt. Ten of the exposed, aged 11 to 73, developed tularemia. One of these died due to complications caused by chronic heart disease.

Tularemia is endemic in the Gori region of the Eurasian country of Georgia. The last outbreak was in 2006. The disease is also endemic on the uninhabited Pakri Islands off the northern coast of Estonia. Used for bombing practice by Soviet forces, chemical and bacteriological weapons may have been dropped on these islands.

In July 2007, an outbreak was reported in the Spanish autonomous region of Castile and León and traced to the plague of voles infesting the region. Another outbreak had taken place ten years before in the same area.

In January 2011, researchers searching for brucellosis among feral pig populations in Texas discovered widespread tularemia infection or evidence of past infection in feral hog populations of at least two Texas counties, even though tularemia is not normally associated with pigs at all. Precautions were recommended for those who hunt, dress, or prepare feral hogs. Since feral hogs roam over large distances, concern exists that tularemia may spread or already be present in feral hogs over a wide geographic area.

In November 2011, it was found in Tasmania. Reports claimed it to be the first in the Southern Hemisphere. However, the causative organism was documented to have been isolated from a foot wound in the Northern Territory in 2003.

In 2014, at least five cases of tularemia were reported in Colorado and at least three more cases in early 2015, including one death as a result of lawn mowing, as noted above. In the summer of 2015, a popular hiking area just north of Boulder was identified as a site of animal infection, and signs were posted to warn hikers.

== History ==
Tularemia was first described by Homma Soken in 1837, who called it "hare meat poisoning". The tularemia bacterium was first isolated by G.W. McCoy of the United States Public Health Service plague lab and reported in 1912. Scientists determined that tularemia could be dangerous to humans; a human being may catch the infection after contacting an infected animal. The ailment soon became associated with hunters, cooks, and agricultural workers.

== Use as a biological weapon ==
Assuming its identification with the Hittite plague of the 14th century BCE is correct, tularemia is among the first weaponized biological agents used in human history.

The Centers for Disease Control and Prevention (CDC) regards F. tularensis as a viable biological warfare agent, and it has been included in the biological warfare programs of the United States, Soviet Union, and Japan at various times. A former Soviet biological weapons scientist, Ken Alibek, has alleged that an outbreak of tularemia among German soldiers shortly before the Battle of Stalingrad was due to the release of F. tularensis by Soviet forces. Others who have studied the pathogen "propose that an outbreak resulting from natural causes is more likely". In the United States, practical research into using rabbit fever as a biological warfare agent took place in 1954 at Pine Bluff Arsenal, Arkansas, an extension of the Fort Detrick program. It was viewed as an attractive agent because:

- it is easy to aerosolize
- it is highly infective; between 10 and 50 bacteria are sufficient to infect victims
- it is fast-acting: symptoms usually appear after three to five days.
- it is nonpersistent and easy to decontaminate (unlike anthrax endospores)
- it is highly incapacitating to infected persons
- it has comparatively low lethality (compared to anthrax), which is useful where enemy soldiers are in proximity to noncombatants, e.g., civilians

The Schu S4 strain was standardized as "Agent UL" for use in the United States M143 bursting spherical bomblet. It was a lethal biological warfare agent with an anticipated fatality rate of 40–60%. The rate of action was around three days, with a duration of action of one to three weeks (treated) and two to three months (untreated), with frequent relapses. UL was a aminoglycoside resistant strain. The aerobiological stability of UL was a major concern, being sensitive to sunlight and losing virulence over time after release. When the 425 strain was standardized as "agent JT" (an incapacitant rather than lethal agent), the Schu S4 strain's symbol was changed again to SR.

Both wet and dry types of F. tularensis (identified by the codes TT and ZZ) were examined during the "Red Cloud" tests, which took place from November 1966 to February 1967 in the Tanana Valley, Alaska.

== Other animals ==
Cats and dogs can acquire the disease from the bite of a tick or flea that has fed on an infected host, such as a rabbit or rodent. For treatment of infected cats, antibiotics are the preferred treatment, including tetracycline, chloramphenicol or streptomycin. Long treatment courses may be necessary as relapses are common.
