= M114 bomb =

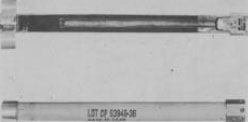
The M114 bomb resembled a pipe bomb

The M114 bomb was a four-pound U.S. anti-personnel bomb and biological cluster bomb sub-munition. The M114 was used in the M33 cluster bomb.

== History ==
The M114 was a sub-munition for the M33 cluster bomb, as such, it was the first standardized U.S. biological weapon in 1952. The M114 was an improved version of a British World War II-era bomblet that was designed to disperse anthrax.

== Specifications ==
The M114 was similar to a pipe bomb: it had a 530-millimetre (21 in) tube with a diameter of 41 mm (1 5/8 in). 108 M114s were clustered into the M33 cluster bomb; each had its own detonator and was ejected from the M33 while the bomb was still aloft. Each M114 held 320 milliliters of Brucella suis.
