= M33 cluster bomb =

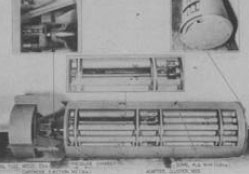
The M33 cluster bomb; the M114 bomblets are visible inside it.

The M33 cluster bomb, also known as the (M33) Brucella cluster bomb, was a U.S. biological cluster bomb developed in the early 1950s and deployed in 1952. It was the first standardized biological weapon in the U.S. arsenal.

== History ==
The U.S. Army Chemical Corps selected Brucella suis as its first mass-produced biological agent in 1949. Tests at Dugway Proving Ground followed in 1950 and 1951. These tests paved the way for the first mass-produced biological weapon in the U.S. arsenal in 1952.

== Specifications ==
The M33 cluster bomb was a 500-pound (227 kg) biological munition that initially carried the biological agent Brucella suis. The M33 held 108 M114 4-pound (1.8 kg) anti-personnel bombs; each M114 held about 320 milliliters of B. suis culture. Besides B. suis the M33 was tested with other agents throughout the 1950s. The M33 was an air-released munition: released at high altitude, it would eject its bomblets while still aloft. Each bomblet would then explode using its own detonator.

== Issues ==
The M33 presented a special logistical problem. The agent used, B. suis, required refrigeration which created a logistical "nightmare". In addition, experts calculated that to attain a proper infection rate over an area of one square mile up to 16 separate M33s were required; around 1,500 individual bomblets. The large number of biological weapons made transport of the weapons for 1952 tests more difficult. The M33 cluster bomb was never used in battle.

== Tests involving the M33 ==
The M33 cluster bomb was used in a series of tests from August-October 1952. At Dugway Proving Ground, Utah, the Army Chemical Corps exposed over 11,000 guinea pigs to B. suis via air-dropped M33s. Although the guinea pig trials caused one Chemical Corps general to remark, "Now we know what to do if we ever go to war against guinea pigs", the tests resulted in the realization that the M33 could not compete with the casualty volume caused by atomic weapons.
