= Flettner rotor bomblet =

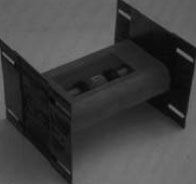
The Flettner rotor bomblet was never standardized by the U.S. military

The Flettner rotor bomblet was a U.S. biological sub-munition that was never mass-produced. Based on the vertical Flettner rotor which takes advantage of the Magnus effect, a force acting on a spinning body in a moving airstream, it was developed toward the end of the U.S. biological weapons program in the 1960s.

== History ==
The Flettner rotor biological bomblet was an experimental cluster bomb sub-munition developed by the U.S. Army during the 1960s, as the U.S. biological weapons program neared its end. The weapon was never standardized or mass-produced. William C. Patrick III said, in 1995, that the Flettner rotor was "probably one of the better devices for disseminating microorganisms."

== Specifications ==
The Flettner rotor was seven inches long (18 cm) and winged. It could carry a liquid or dry biological agent and was designed to be used as a sub-munition in a missile warhead, cluster bomb or dispenser. The fins, or wings, were designed to extend by centrifugal force, thus stabilizing the bomblet as it flew to the target area. The Flettner rotor has a glide angle of 44 degrees. The Flettner rotor made it possible for a single B-52 to cover an area of 20,000 square kilometers with biological agent.

The Flettner rotor utilized the delayed action dissemination technique (DADT) fuse. This type of fuse has two functions. The first is that the internal fuse can initiate the gas expulsion system in the event of tampering, or certain environmental conditions. This DADT fuse also self-destructs after three days if the munition fails to dispense its agent on impact as designed. Fuses incorporating self-destruct mechanisms are considerably more expensive than traditional fuses.

== See also ==
- Rotor ship
