= M143 bomblet =

Biological munition

The M143 bomblet was a biological cluster bomb sub-munition developed by the United States during the 1960s. The spherical bomblet was the biological version of the Sarin-filled M139 chemical bomblet.

== History ==
The M143 bomblet was produced at the peak of U.S. biological delivery systems development during the 1960s. Essentially a biological version of the M139 bomblet, the M143 was smaller than the M139. The Sergeant missile system used the M143 in its M210 warhead, which could hold 720 individual bomblets. If that system released the bomblets at an altitude of 50,000 feet (15,000 m), the weapon could attain a coverage area of 60 square miles (160 km^{2}).

== Specifications ==
The M143 was a spherical bomblet that had a diameter of 3.4 inches (8.6 cm). Designed to carry a liquid biological agent, the M143 carried a 0.02-ounce (0.5 g) explosive charge meant to disseminate the agent upon impact. Eight percent of the liquid released from the M143 was in the form of an inhalable aerosol. When filled, the bomblet had a mass of 0.75 pounds (0.34 kg) and 6.4 US fluid ounces (190 ml) of liquid agent could contain 6 trillion anthrax spores. Given the lethality of even a small amount of biological agent, the amount of anthrax contained in the bomblet would be the equivalent of 300 million lethal doses.

== Tests involving the M143 ==
The M143 bomblet was used in multiple biological weapons effectiveness tests by the U.S. Army. Two tests, collectively dubbed "Yellow Leaf", sought to test the M143 and biological agents in a jungle environment. Tests planned for the Panama Canal Zone using tiara as a simulant could not be completed because of "international considerations", and an alternate test site was found in Hawaii at the Ōlaʻa Forest, southwest of Hilo. The goals of the Yellow Leaf tests were to learn the effectiveness of the M143 in a jungle environment and the area of coverage for a U.S. Navy MISTEYE I weapons system Sergeant missile biological warhead over a jungle. The Panama tests took place in February 1964 and the Hawaii tests, using the simulant Bacillus globigii, took place from April-May 1966.

Other tests, known as "Red Cloud", took place from November 1966-February 1967 in the Tanana Valley near Fort Greely, Alaska. The main goal of Red Cloud was to obtain data on Francisella tularensis and its decay rate as well as its animal infectivity data. The tests involved M143 bomblets being dropped from a tower-mounted gun into a wintertime spruce forest. E26 and M32 dissemination devices were also used. The tests disseminated the following biological agents or simulants: F. tularensis (both wet and dry variants), B. globigii, Serratia marcescens, and Escherichia coli. Both Red Cloud and Yellow Leaf were overseen by the U.S. Army's Deseret Test Center, and were part of Project 112.

== See also ==
- E120 bomblet
- M134 bomblet
