= List of acronyms: W =

This list contains acronyms, initialisms, and pseudo-blends that begin with the letter W.

For the purposes of this list:

- acronym = an abbreviation pronounced as if it were a word, e.g., SARS = severe acute respiratory syndrome, pronounced to rhyme with cars
- initialism = an abbreviation pronounced wholly or partly using the names of its constituent letters, e.g., CD = compact disc, pronounced cee dee
- pseudo-blend = an abbreviation whose extra or omitted letters mean that it cannot stand as a true acronym, initialism, or portmanteau (a word formed by combining two or more words).

(a) = acronym, e.g.: SARS – (a) severe acute respiratory syndrome
(i) = initialism, e.g.: CD – (i) compact disc
(p) = pseudo-blend, e.g.: UNIFEM – (p) United Nations Development Fund for Women
(s) = symbol (none of the above, representing and pronounced as something else; for example: MHz – megahertz)

Some terms are spoken as either acronym or initialism, e.g., VoIP, pronounced both as voyp and V-O-I-P.

(Main list of acronyms)

- W
  - (s) Tungsten (from German Wolfram)
  - (i) Watt
  - (i) Wednesday
  - (i) West
  - (i) Games Won in sporting competitions

== W0–9 ==
- W3C – (i) World Wide Web Consortium
- w/ – (p) With: Software w/Documentation. Typically used in advertising or to abbreviate headings. Never used in formal body text.

== WA ==
- wa – (s) Walloon language (ISO 639-1 code)
- WA
  - (s) Namibia (FIPS 10-4 country code; from West Africa)
  - Washington state (postal symbol)
  - Western Australia (postal symbol)
  - (i) World Archery (Federation)
  - World Athletics
- WAAC – (i) Women's Army Auxiliary Corps (Britain) (World War I UK)
- WAAF – (i) Women's Auxiliary Air Force (World War II UK)
- WAC
  - (a) Western Athletic Conference
  - (i) Women's Auxiliary Corps (World War II Canada)
  - Women's Army Corps (World War II U.S.)
- WACC – (a) Weighted Average Cost of Capital (accounting)
- WACS – What-A-Cartoon! Show
- WAD – (a) Weapons Alert Designator
- WAGGGS – (a) World Association of Girl Guides and Girl Scouts
- WAGMI - (a) We're All Gonna Make It
- WAGs – (p) Wives And Girlfriends (most notably of England national football team players at the 2006 FIFA World Cup, although the term existed earlier)
- WAK – (s) Wake Island (ISO 3166 trigram, obsolete 1986)
- WAL – see entry
- WAN – (a) Wide area network
- WAP – (a) Wireless Application Protocol
- WAPIMA – (a) What a pain in my ass
- WAR – (a) With All Respect
- WAsP – (p) Short form of WAAAAP (Wind Atlas Analysis and Application Program)
- WASP
  - (a) White Anglo-Saxon Protestant
  - Wide Angle Search for Planets
  - Women Airforce Service Pilots
- WAYP – (a) White And Yellow Pages

== WB ==
- Wb – (s) Weber
- WB
  - (i) Warner Bros.
  - Welcome Back (Internet shorthand)
- WBA
  - (i) Warner Bros. Animation
  - West Bromwich Albion (F.C.)
  - World Boxing Association
- WBC – (i) World Boxing Council
- WBE – (i) Work Breakdown Element
- WBIT – (i) Women's Basketball Invitation Tournament
- WBO – (i) World Boxing Organization
- WbW
  - with best wishes
  - white boy wasted

== WC ==
- WC – (i) Water Closet – Winston Churchill – World Cup (sports)
- WCBO – (i) World Chess Boxing Organisation
- WCBP – (i) World Center for Birds of Prey
- WCCW – (i) World Class Championship Wrestling
- WCDay – (a/i) World Constitution Day
- WCL – (i) World Confederation of Labour
- WCPA – (p) World Constitution and Parliament Association
- WCS – (i) Weapon Control Status – Wildlife Conservation Society
- WCW – (i) World Championship Wrestling
- WCWCC – (p) World Committee for a World Constitutional Convention
- WCWS – (i) Women's College World Series, the final phase of the NCAA Division I softball tournament in the US

== WD ==
- WDC – (i) Western Design Center – World Data Center
- WDWR – Walt Disney World Resort
- WDIN – Wildlife Disease Information Node

== WE ==
- WEBS – (a) Weapon Effectiveness Battle Simulation
- WEC – (i) World Extreme Cagefighting
- WEEE – (i) Waste Electrical and Electronic Equipment
- WEF – (a) World Economic Forum
- WEIRD – (a) Western, educated, industrialized, rich, democratic (cultural identifier of a disproportionate number of psychology test subjects)
- WEM - (a) West Edmonton Mall
- WEU – (i) Western European Union
- WEZ – (a/i) Weapon Engagement Zone

== WF ==
- WF – (s) Wallis and Futuna Islands (ISO 3166 digram)
- WFC – (i) Women's Forage Corps (World War I UK)
- WFD – (i) Weapon(s) of Focused Destruction
- WFF – (i) Wallops Flight Facility
- WFI - Water for Injection
- WFP – (i) World Food Programme
- WFT – (i) Washington Football Team (former NFL franchise name)
- WFZ – (i) Weapons Free Zone

== WG ==
- WG – (i) Working Group – Wade–Giles
- WGS 84 – World Geodetic System 1984
- WGSRPD
  - World Geographical Scheme for Recording Plant Distributions
  - an international biogeography based standardized placename system for flora + floristics locations.

== WH ==
- WH – (i) Wehrmacht Heer (German World War II army vehicle licence plate code)
- WHAM – (a) Wisconsin Hydrogen-Alpha Mapping (telescope)
- WHI – (i) Women's Health Initiative
- WHIP – (a) Walks plus hits per inning pitched
- WHO – (a) World Health Organization
- WHS – (i) (U.S.) Washington Headquarters Services

== WI ==
- WI
  - (s) Western Sahara (FIPS 10-4 country code)
  - Wisconsin (postal symbol)
  - (i) Women's Institute
- WIA
  - (i) Wounded In Action
  - (a) Wireless Institute of Australia (Amateur Radio)
- WIC – (a/i) U.S. (Special Supplemental Nutrition Program for) Women, Infants and Children (often pronounced "wick")
- WIIFM - (i) What's in it for me?
- WIE- (a) Windows Internet Explorer
- WIMP
  - (a) Weakly Interacting Massive Particle
  - Windows, Icons, Menus, Pointers
- WIN-T – (i) Warfighter Information Network-Tactical
- WIPO – (a/i) World Intellectual Property Organization
- WIPP – (a) [Nuclear] Waste Isolation Pilot Plant
- WIYN – (i) Wisconsin Indiana Yale NOAO telescope consortium

== WJ ==
- WJKK WJKF – Waheguru Ji Ka Khalsa, Waheguru Ji Ke Fateh, a Sikh greeting

== WK ==
- WK – (s) Wake Island (ISO 3166 digram, obsolete 1986)
- WKYP – (a) Will Keep You Posted
- WKX – (a) World Kickboxing Xtrm

== WL ==
- WL – (i) Wehrmacht Luftwaffe (German World War II air force vehicle licence plate code)
- WLB – (i) Women's Land Brigade (World War II Canada)
- WLF – (s) Wallis and Futuna Islands (ISO 3166 trigram)
- wln – (s) Walloon language (ISO 639-2 code)
- WLOG – (i) Without Loss Of Generality (see WOLOG)

== WM ==
- WM – (i) Wehrmacht Marine (German World War II navy vehicle licence plate code)
- WMANUS – (a) West Midlands Area National Union of Students
- WMD
  - (i) Weapon[s] of Mass Destruction
  - World Movement for Democracy †
- WMI – (i) Wildlife Management Institute
- WMO – (i) World Meteorological Organization

== WN ==
- WNA – (i) World Nuclear Association
- WNBA – (i) Women's National Basketball Association
- WNF – (i) "Will Not Fix"
- WNL - (i) Medical initialism for "Within Normal Limits"
- WNIT – (i) Women's National Invitation Tournament
- WNSD – (i) What's New, Scooby-Doo?
- WNW – (s) West North-West

== WO ==
- wo – (s) Wolof language (ISO 639-1 code)
- WO – (i) Warrant Officer
- W/O – (p) Without: Software w/o Documentation
- w/o
  - Weight per cent
  - without
- WOF - Width of Fabric
- WOFT – (a) Waste Of F***ing Time
- WOFTAM – (a) Waste Of F***ing Time And Money
- WOI – (a/i) Wheels Of Italy
- wol – (s) Wolof language (ISO 639-2 code)
- WOLOG (or WLOG) – (a/i) WithOut Loss Of Generality
- WOM – (a) Write Only Memory
- WOS – (i) Wilson Ornithological Society
- WOSM
  - (i) World Organization of the Scout Movement
  - Worldwide Oil Spill Model
- WOT – (i) Waste Of Time
- WoW or WOW – (a) World of Warcraft

== WP ==
- WP
  - (i) White Phosphorus (ammunition)
  - (i) Workers' Party (Singapore)
- WPB – (i) War Production Board during World War II
- WPE – (i) World Pork Expo
- WPK – (p) Wider Peacekeeping
- WPN – (i) Wizards Play Network (sanctioning body for several games, most notably Magic: The Gathering)
- WPT
  - (i) World Poker Tour
  - World Premiere Toons
- WPP - (i) Witness Protection Program

== WQ ==
- WQS – World Qualifying series (surf)

== WR ==
- WR – (i) Wide receiver (gridiron football)
- WRAC – (a) Women's Royal Army Corps (World War II UK)
- WRAIR – (a) Walter Reed Army Institute of Research
- WRBWWRM – (i) "We Read Best What We Read Most"
- WRC – (i) World Rally Championship
- WRC - World Religions Conference
- WRNS – (i) Women's Royal Naval Service (World War II UK) (pronounced "wrens")
- WRVS – (i) Women's Royal Voluntary Service, now only known by the acronym (UK)
- WRS – (i) Worldwide Reference System
- wrt, also w.r.t. or w/r/t – (i) with respect to or with regard to, depending on context
- WRT
  - (i) Writer Response Theory
  - (i) WRT - "With respect to", especially in fields such as Mathematics.
  - (i) World Rally Team
  - (i) Wallace Roberts & Todd, LLC (Urban Planning and Design)
  - (i) Wireless Ronin Technologies (digital signage)
  - (i) NHS Workforce Review Team
  - The Linksys routers whose model name start with 'WRT'
  - (i) Wholesale, Trade, Retail sector, category in employment and economics statistics
  - (i) Wireless Receiver/Transmitter ( computer networks/IT )
  - Third party firmware for the Linksys WRT routers and compatible models from other vendors.
  - (i) Web Runtime (WRT) is a portable application framework developed by Nokia that allows the creation of widgets on the S60 Platform.

== WS ==
- WS
  - (s) Samoa (ISO 3166 and FIPS 10-4 country code digram; from the country's former name of Western Samoa)
  - (i) Writer to the Signet (a Scottish solicitor)
- WSC – (i) Weapon System Catalogue
- WSDL – (i) Web Services Description Language
- WSJ – (i) (The) Wall Street Journal
- WSL
  - (i) White Star Line (shipping company)
  - Women's Super League, currently used to describe England's top women's association football league and formerly to describe that country's top women's rugby union competition
  - Workers' Socialist League (UK political party)
- WSM
  - (s) Samoa (ISO 3166 trigram; from Western Samoa)
  - (i) Winchester Short Magnum (family of rifle cartridges)
- WSMR – (a/i) White Sands Missile Range ("whiz-murr")
- WSROC – (a) Western Sydney Regional Organisation of Councils
- WSSM – (i) Winchester Super Short Magnum (family of rifle cartridges)
- WST
  - (i) Water Soluble Tetrazolium (assay)
  - (s) Samoan tālā (ISO 4217 currency code)
- WSTC – (i) Women Signallers Territorial Corps (World War II UK)
- WSUS – Windows Server Update Services
- WSW – (s) West South-West

== WT ==
- WTA – (i) Women's Tennis Association (cf. WTA Tour, operated by this body)
- WTB
  - (i) Wales Tourism Board
  - Warenterminbörse Hannover
- WTB – (i) Want to Buy (a commonly used phrase in various online games and buy/sell messageboards)
- WTC – (i) World Trade Center
- WTF – (i) What the fuck?; also What a Terrible Failure (android)
- WTFH – (i) What The F**king Hell
- WTH – (i) What the Hell
- WTNWD – (i) Wait To Next Working Day (a commonly used phrase to maintain work life balance)
- WTO – (i) World Trade Organization
- WTS – (i) Want to Sell (a commonly used phrase in various online games and buy/sell messageboards)

== WU ==
- WU – (i) Wabash University – Washington University in St. Louis – Western Union – Windows Update – Work unit – WU Wien (German Wirtschaftsuniversität Wien, Vienna University of Economics and Business Administration)
- WUU2 – What you up to – Internet slang popular with teenagers.
- WUBU2 – What you been up to

== WV ==
- WV – (s) West Virginia (postal symbol)
- WVA – (i) World Veterinary Association
- WVIAC – (i) West Virginia Intercollegiate Athletic Conference
- WVR – (i) Women's Volunteer Reserve (World War II UK)
- WVSC – (i) Women's Volunteer Service Corps (World War II Canada)
- WVU – (i) West Virginia University
- WVUIT – (i) West Virginia University Institute of Technology (note, however, that the initialism is almost never used; the popular name of the school is "WVU Tech")

== WW ==
- WW – see entry
- WWE – (i) World Wrestling Entertainment
- WWF
  - (i) World Wide Fund for Nature, from its original name of World Wildlife Fund, which remains the legal name in the U.S. and Canada
  - World Wrestling Federation
- WWI – (i) World War I
- WWII – (i) World War II
- WWIII – (i) World War III
- WWJD – (i) "What would Jesus do?"
- WWS – (i) Wheaton Warrenville South High School
- WWV – (i) Wagner-Werk-Verzeichnis (catalog of the works of Richard Wagner, and callsign of NIST's shortwave radio station in Fort Collins, Colorado)
- WWW – (i) World Wide Web
- WWWF – (i) World Wide Wrestling Federation

== WX ==
- WXO – (i) Weather [Executive] Officer

== WY ==
- WY – (s) Wyoming (postal symbol)
- WYSIWYG – (a) What You See Is What You Get (pronounced "wizzy-wig". See entry for derived acronyms)
- WYSIWYP – (a) What You See Is What You Print / What You See Is What You Pay ("wizzy-whip")
- WYRFTTM – When You Are Free Talk To Me

== WZ ==
- WZ – (s) Eswatini (FIPS 10-4 country code)
