= Wo =

Wo or WO may refer to:

== Airlines ==
- World Airways (former IATA code: WO), a 1948–2014 US airline
- Swoop (airline) (former IATA code: WO), a former Canadian ultra low-cost airline

== Language ==
- Wo (kana), a Japanese kana
- Wolof language (ISO 639-1 code "wo")

== Sport ==
- Walk-off (disambiguation)
- Walkover, awarded if there are no opposing players available.

== People ==
- Zhang Wo, Chinese painter of the Yuan Dynasty
- Wo Weihan (1949–2008), an executed Chinese scientist and entrepreneur
- W. O. Bentley (1888–1971), British car designer
- Wo Ding, traditionally believed to be a king of the Shang Dynasty
- Wo Jia, a king of the Shang Dynasty

== Other uses ==
- Warrant officer, a military rank
- Wine of Origin, a designated area for South African wine production
- Wo' or Uo, a month of the Haab' in the Mayan calendar
- Wo, a chimpanzee deity of the Yaoundé people of the Cameroons; son of Zamba
- Wo Fat (disambiguation), several fictional characters
- "Wo" (song), by Olamide, 2017

== See also ==
- W0 (disambiguation)
- WOA (disambiguation)
- Woah (disambiguation)
- Woe (disambiguation)
- Woh, an Indian TV series
- Woo (disambiguation)
- Wu (disambiguation)
- VVO (disambiguation)
- OW (disambiguation)
- W/o (disambiguation)
