= WFC =

WFC may refer to:

== Association football clubs ==
- A women's football club (named with the acronym W.F.C.)
- Vancouver Whitecaps FC (MLS), Canada
- Wakefield F.C., Yorkshire, England
- Wakehurst F.C., Northern Ireland
- Walsall F.C., Midlands, England
- Walthamstow F.C., north-east London
- Warriors FC, Singapore
- Watford F.C., Hertfordshire, England
- Wealdstone F.C., south-west London
- Weymouth F.C., Dorset, England
- Willowbank F.C., Northern Ireland
- Willowfield F.C., Northern Ireland
- Wimbledon F.C., west London
- Windsor F.C. (disambiguation), several clubs
- Wishaw F.C., Scotland
- Woking F.C., Surrey, England
- Woodvale F.C., Belfast, Northern Ireland
- Woodvale F.C., Scotland
- Wrexham F.C., Wales

== Businesses ==
- Wall Financial Corporation, a Canadian real estate company
- Wells Fargo & Company, an American bank
- World Financial Center (disambiguation)
  - Brookfield Place (New York City), formerly World Financial Center
- World Finance Corporation, 1971–1980
- World's Finest Chocolate, United States, 1939

== Events ==
- World Fantasy Convention, United States, since 1975
- The World Fireworks Championship, Oman, 2010
- World Floorball Championships, since 1996
- World Football Challenge, Northern America, 2000–2012
- World Forestry Congress, held since 1926 by the UN

== Gaming ==
- Nintendo Wi-Fi Connection, a multiplayer service and store, 2005–2014
- Transformers: War for Cybertron, 2010

== Other organisations ==
- World Federation of Chiropractic
- World Fellowship Center, New Hampshire, United States
- WorldFish Center, Penang, Malaysia
- World Food Council, UN body, 1974–1993
- Women's Forage Corps, a branch of the UK military during WWI
- Women For Change, a South African civil society organisation
- World Future Council, Germany

== Science and technology ==
- Wave function collapse, in quantum physics
- Wide Field Camera (disambiguation), various astronomical instruments
- Woodfree coated paper
- Wi-Fi calling, in mobile telephony
- Windows Foundation Classes, in Visual J++ programming

== Transportation ==
- West Falls Church station, on the Washington Metro
