= WIAS =

WIAS may refer to:

- Weierstrass Institute, formally known as the Weierstrass Institute for Applied Analysis and Stochastics
- West Indies Associated States
- Windhoek Show, formally known as the Windhoek Industrial and Agricultural Show

== See also ==
- WIA (disambiguation)
