= World Trade Center attack =

World Trade Center attack may refer to one of two terrorist attacks on the original World Trade Center:

- 1993 World Trade Center bombing, in which the building complex was damaged
- September 11 attacks in 2001, in which the building complex was destroyed

== See also ==
- World Trade Center (disambiguation)
