= VVV =

VVV may refer to:

== Arts and entertainment ==
- VVV (magazine), a surrealist publication
- VVV-Venlo, a Dutch football team
- Venus Versus Virus (a.k.a. V.V.V.), a manga by Atsushi Suzumi
- Vereniging voor Vreemdelingenverkeer, the tourist board of the Netherlands
- Victoria Velasquez Vincent, a Filipino-New Zealand model and pageant titleholder
- Valvrave the Liberator, a Japanese mecha anime series
- Valhalla Vintage Verb, a computer program that creates reverberation effects for music production

== Other uses ==
- Valvoline, an American company which trades on the NYSE as VVV
- Varsity Victory Volunteers, a Japanese-American paramilitary unit in Hawaii
- Vereeniging voor Vrouwenkiesrecht, the Dutch Association for Women's Suffrage
- Vista Variables in the Via Lactea or the VVV Survey, an astronomical survey of the bulge and disk of our galaxy

== See also ==
- VV (disambiguation)
- vvvv, a general-purpose digital audio/video toolkit
- VVVVVV, a 2010 puzzle-platform video game created by Terry Cavanagh
- VVV-Avia, the manufacturer of the Elitar-202 and Elitar Sigma aircraft
- VVV-Spetstekhnika, a dredging factory in Kherson, Ukraine
- VVVVID, an Italian video on demand service
- Variable-voltage variable-frequency drive (VVVF drive), a type of system with a motor
- VVVtunia, AKA Neptunia Virtual Stars, a 2020 video game by Compile Heart

=== Airports in Vietnam ===
- Van Don International Airport (ICAO code VVVD)
- Vinh International Airport (ICAO code VVVH)
- Vung Tau Airport (ICAO code VVVT)
