= WIYN =

WIYN may refer to:

- WIYN Consortium
- WIYN Observatory, owned and operated by the WIYN Consortium
- WCEB (FM), a radio station (94.7 FM) licensed to Deposit, New York, United States, which held the call sign WIYN from 1989 to 2024
