= WWY =

WWY may refer to:

- West Wyalong Airport, with an IATA code of WWY
- Wefri Warsay Yika'alo, a war recovery project in Eritrea
- Queen's Own Warwickshire and Worcestershire Yeomanry (QOWWY or WWY), a British regiment
- Wong Wai Yin (born 1981), a Hong Kong artist
- The licence code for Wyszków County

== See also ==
- WY (disambiguation)
