= WSTS (disambiguation) =

WSTS is an American radio station broadcasting a southern gospel format.

WSTS may also stand for:

- Well-structured transition system in computer science.
- Wyoming State Training School, former facility of Wyoming Department of Health

== See also ==
- WST (disambiguation)
