= WV (disambiguation) =

WV is West Virginia, a U.S. state.

WV or wv may also refer to:

== Places ==
- Western Visayas, a region in the Philippines
- WV postcode area, England
- WV, a prefix for tombs found in the West Valley of the Valley of the Kings

== Transportation and military ==
- Swe Fly (IATA airline designator WV)
- Lockheed EC-121 Warning Star, designated WV-1, WV-2, WV-3 in US Navy service
- Weerodara Vibhushanaya, a military decoration in Sri Lanka

== Computing ==
- wv (software), software formerly known as MSWordView or wvware
- WavPack, software whose file extension is .wv
- Wireless Village, an instant messaging protocol and presence services

== Other uses ==
- WandaVision, a 2021 Disney+ miniseries
- Wikivoyage, a collaboratively edited, multilingual, free content Internet travel guide
- Werke-Verzeichnis, abbreviated to WV, German for 'works catalogue', used in relation to catalogues of classical compositions, such as BWV, BuxWV, and HWV

== See also ==
- VW (disambiguation)
- VVV (disambiguation)
