= RMX =

RMX may refer to

- RMX (operating system), a real-time operating system designed for use with Intel 8080 and 8086 processors
- Fast RMX, a Nintendo Switch racing video game
- Reverse MX, a computer protocol related to email transfer
- Risk Management Exchange, a financial market in Germany
- Remix, an alternative version of a recorded song, made from an original version
