= W and Z =

W and Z may refer to:

- W and Z bosons, or weak bosons, elementary particles
- W' and Z' bosons, hypothetical gauge bosons
- W and Z class destroyer, destroyers of the Royal Navy launched in 1943–1944

== See also ==
- WZ (disambiguation)
