= List of colleges and universities in Hawaii =

This is a list of colleges and universities in Hawaii. This list also includes other accredited educational institutions providing higher education, meaning tertiary, quaternary, and, in some cases, post-secondary education.

== Institutions ==
=== Four-year Institutions ===
School	Location	Control	Carnegie Classification	Enrollment (Fall 2024)	Founded
Atlantic International University	Honolulu	Private (For Profit)	Unaccredited		1998
Brigham Young University–Hawaii	Laie	Private (Not For Profit)	Baccalaureate college	2,906	1955
Chaminade University of Honolulu	Honolulu	Private (Not For Profit)	Masters University	2,709	1955
Hawaii Pacific University	Honolulu	Private (Not For Profit)	Masters University	4,921	1965
Hawaiʻi Community College	Hilo	Public	Associates College	2,289	1941
Honolulu Community College	Honolulu	Public	Associates College	3,342	1920
Institute of Clinical Acupuncture and Oriental Medicine	Honolulu	Private (For Profit)	Special focus	61	1996
Kapiʻolani Community College	Honolulu	Public	Associates College	5,914	1946
Kauaʻi Community College	Lihue	Public	Associates College	1,335	1965
Leeward Community College	Pearl City	Public	Associates College	6,471	1968
Pacific Rim Christian University	Honolulu	Private (Not For Profit)	Special Focus	187	2015
University of Hawaiʻi at Hilo	Hilo	Public	Doctoral University	2,668	1947
University of Hawaiʻi at Mānoa	Honolulu	Public	Doctoral University	20,028	1907
University of Hawaiʻi Maui College	Kahului	Public	Baccalaureate/Associate's College	2,792	1931
University of Hawaiʻi at West Oʻahu	Kapolei	Public	Baccalaureate college	2,814	1976
Windward Community College	Kaneohe	Public	Associates College	2,765	1972

=== Two-year Institutions ===
- Hawaii Tokai International College, Kapolei

=== Former Institutions ===
School	Location	Control	Carnegie Classification	Founded	Closed
World Medicine Institute	Honolulu	Private (For Profit)	Masters University	1970	2018

== See also ==
- List of college athletic programs in Hawaii
- Higher education in the United States
- Lists of American institutions of higher education
- List of recognized higher education accreditation organizations
- Lists of universities and colleges
- Lists of universities and colleges by country
