= Elitar-202 =

General information
- Type: Two seat ultralight
- Manufacturer: Elitar (Samara VVV-Avia)
- Number built: 10 by August 2003

History
- First flight: c.2002

The Elitar-202 or Elitar (Samara VVV-Avia) 202 is a conventionally laid out, single engine ultralight aircraft which seats two in side-by-side configuration. Designed in Russia, production of the Type 202 began in 2003.

== Design and development ==
Like the Elitar Sigma, the Elitar-202 is manufactured at Samara by VVV-Avia. It is a low wing monoplane constructed largely of composites, with foam filled GRP surfaces and GRP/carbon fibre wing spars. The wings are fitted with flaps and in plan have rounded leading edges near the upturned tips. The leading edge of the fin is strongly swept; the rudder is less swept and has a cut-away at its base for elevator movement. There is a small ventral fin.

The side-by-side seating is enclosed by a rear hinged, largely transparent canopy, with another transparency behind on each side of the rearward tapering fuselage. The 202 is powered by a 73.5 kW (98.6 hp) Rotax 912ULS flat four engine driving a three blade propeller. It has a fixed, tricycle undercarriage, with faired mainwheels mounted on cantilever spring legs and a trailing link nosewheel. A MVEN K-700-00 ballistic recovery parachute is an option.

== Operational history ==
The 202 was first seen in public in 2003 at MAKS '03 in Moscow. Ten were reported built and twelve more on order at this time. It was predicted that certification would be completed by November 2003 but in 2009 this remained unconfirmed.

== Specifications ==
Data from Jane's All the World's Aircraft 2011/12

General characteristics

- Capacity: 2
- Length: 5.69 m (18 ft 8 in)
- Wingspan: 8.30 m (27 ft 3 in)
- Height: 2.05 m (6 ft 9 in)
- Wing area: 9.10 m^{2} (98.0 sq ft) gross
- Empty weight: 510 kg (1,124 lb)
- Gross weight: 730 kg (1,609 lb)
- Fuel capacity: 100 L (26.4 US gal, 22.0 Imp gal)
- Powerplant: 1 × Rotax 912ULS air- and water- cooled flat-four, 73.5 kW (98.6 hp)
- Propellers: 3-bladed Lugansk 1010, ground adjustable pitch

Performance

- Maximum speed: 210 km/h (130 mph, 110 kn)
- Cruise speed: 150 km/h (93 mph, 81 kn) economical
- Stall speed: 90 km/h (56 mph, 49 kn) flaps down
- Never exceed speed: 240 km/h (150 mph, 130 kn)
- Range: 900 km (560 mi, 490 nmi)
- Service ceiling: 3,000 m (9,800 ft) service
- g limits: +3.8/-1.9
- Rate of climb: 4.5 m/s (890 ft/min) maximum at sea level
- Wing loading: 80.2 kg/m^{2} (16.4 lb/sq ft) maximum
