= Wimpy =

Wimpy may refer to:

- J. Wellington Wimpy, a hamburger-loving character from the Popeye cartoons
- Wimpy (restaurant), a chain of hamburger restaurants, named after the cartoon character
  - Mr. Wimpy (character) cartoon character created for brand promotion
  - Mr. Wimpy (video game)
- Wimpy's Diner, a chain of 1950s–1960s themed diners found in southern Ontario
- Wimpy P-1 (born 1937), first registered American Quarter Horse
- Luther "Wimpy" Lassiter (1918–2001), American pool player known by the Wimpy nickname
- The Vickers Wellington bomber aircraft, commonly known as the "Wimpy" amongst service personnel
- Diary of a Wimpy Kid, 2007 children's novel by Jeff Kinney, the first of a series and media franchise
- William "Wimpy" Winpisinger (1924–1997), President of the International Association of Machinists
- Wimpy Operation in the 1982 Lebanon War

== See also ==
- Wimpey Homes, a defunct housebuilding company based in England
- Taylor Wimpey, housebuilding company based in England
- Wimp (disambiguation)
