= WFPS (disambiguation) =

WFPS is a radio station in Illinois, US.

WFPS may also refer to:

- Wi-Fi positioning system, a geolocation system using nearby Wi-Fi
- Winnipeg Fire Paramedic Service, Manitoba, Canada
- West Fargo Public Schools, North Dakota, US

== See also ==
- West Feliciana Parish Public Schools (WFPPS), Louisiana, US
- WFP (disambiguation)
