= Wol =

Wol, WoL or WOL may refer to:

== Computing ==
- Wake-on-LAN, (/wɒl/) an Ethernet standard that allows computers to be powered on by a network message
- An unofficial initialism for Web Ontology Language
- .wol, file extension for the WOLF eBook file format
- World Online, a defunct European internet service provider

== Computer games ==
- War of Legends, (/wɒl/) a fantasy real-time strategy game published by Jagex Games Studio
- Warhammer Online, abbreviation used internally by Games Workshop staff
- StarCraft II: Wings of Liberty
- Westwood Online, multi-player game mode by Westwood Studios, superseded by XWIS
- West of Loathing, a comedy adventure role-playing game published by Asymmetric Publications

== Transport ==
- Shellharbour Airport, Wollongong, Australia IATA code
- Wood Lane tube station, London Underground station code

== Other uses ==
- Owl (Winnie the Pooh), character in the Winnie the Pooh stories, who spells his name "Wol"
- Wide outside lane, in bicycle transportation engineering
- Within Our Lifetime, a pro-Palestinian activist organization
- Wol, the main character of Mobius Final Fantasy
- WOL (AM), a radio station in Washington, D.C.

== See also ==
- Word of Life (disambiguation)
