= World Trade =

World Trade may refer to:

- International trade
- International finance
- World Trade Organization
- World Trade Week, a United States observance each May
- World Trade (band), a progressive rock band
- World Trade Center (disambiguation)
