= WRT =

WRT may refer to:

== Computing ==
- Linksys WRT54G series of wireless routers
- Web Runtime (WRT) for the Symbian/S60 mobile OS

== Organisations ==
- Wallace Roberts & Todd, an architecture firm in Philadelphia, United States
- W Racing Team, a Belgian motor racing team

== Places in England ==
- Warton Aerodrome, Lancashire (IATA code)
- Worstead railway station, Norfolk (CRS code)

== Abbreviations ==
- WRT, w.r.t., w/r/t, see List of acronyms:W § WR
