= WTB =

WTB may refer to:

- Walk Thru the Bible Ministries, a Christian educational organization
- Warenterminbörse Hannover, a German futures exchange
- Welcome to Bloxburg, a Roblox experience
- Welsh Tourist Board, former name of the Welsh Assembly Government's tourism team, Visit Wales
- Wilderness Trail Bikes, a US-based bicycle component company
- Wire Train Bus, a fieldbus used in train control systems, and described in IEC 61375
- With The Beatles, the second album by The Beatles
- Toowoomba Wellcamp Airport, IATA airport code
- Woytinsky-Tarnow-Baade plan, a proposed economic program in the Weimar Republic
