= WRS =

Wrs, or WRS, may refer to:

== Arts and entertainment ==
- Andrei Ursu, a Romanian singer, previously known as Wrs
- World Radio Switzerland, a Swiss English-language station

== Businesses ==
- Western Rail Switching, a former railroad in the United States
- Wind River Systems, a former embedded software company, now part of Intel

== Military ==
- War reserve stock, material held for wartime
- 53d Weather Reconnaissance Squadron, also known as Hurricane Hunters

== Other uses ==
- Waris language, spoken on New Guinea (ISO 639-3: wrs)
- Wolcott-Rallison syndrome, a rare medical disorder
- Worker Registration Scheme, a registration scheme for foreign workers in the United Kingdom
- World record size, in the Registry of World Record Size Shells
- Wressle railway station, East Yorkshire, England (CRS code: WRS)

== See also ==
- WR (disambiguation)
