= WLF =

WLF is an abbreviation that may stand for:

== Organisations and businesses ==
- Wayanad Literature Festival, India's largest rurally-held literature festival
- Washington Legal Foundation, an American conservative non-profit legal organisation in Washington, D.C.
- West Liberty Foods, a meat processing company in Iowa, US
- World Law Foundation, an international organisation dedicated to the rule of law, based in Madrid, Spain
- World Leagues Forum, an organisation for association football leagues
- World Liberty Financial, a cryptocurrency company
- World Literacy Foundation, a global organisation based in Melbourne, Australia
- World Lung Foundation, a public health NFP in New York

== Other uses ==
- Swap loader vehicle (German: "Wechselladerfahrzeug"), in containerized firefighting equipment
- Viva La Figa, the meaning of the three letters on Valentino Rossi's leathers
- Waist-level finder, a kind of viewfinder used in some cameras
- WLF, station code for Whittlesford Parkway railway station (station code)
- Wu Lin Feng, a Chinese mixed martial arts TV show
- Wiki Loves Folklore, an annual global photography and other media contest
