= WBC =

WBC may stand for:

== Business ==
- Westinghouse Broadcasting Company, a former large American broadcaster now folded into CBS
- Westpac (New Zealand Exchange code: WBC), a multinational financial services company
- Wholesale Broadband Connect, a UK internet provider
- Workers Beer Company, a UK/Ireland organization providing event catering services

== Government ==
- War Bureau of Consultants, a 1941 US committee on biological warfare
- West Berkshire Council, a UK local government district

== Media ==
- World Book Club, a radio programme on the BBC World Service
- Worldview Broadcasting Channel, a Malaysian news channel
- White Blood Cells (album), 2001, by the White Stripes
- Warner Bros. Cartoons, a defunct U.S. animation studio, which operated from 1930 to 1969
- WBC, a former cable station branding of The WB 100+ Station Group station, in Charlottesville, Virginia

== Sports and competitions ==
- S.V. Walking Boyz Company, a Surinamese association football club
- BWF World Championships, a.k.a. World Badminton Championships
- World Baseball Classic, an international tournament
- World Basketball Challenge, an international competition
- World Boxing Council, an international boxing sanctioning body
- World Barista Championship, for coffee drink preparers
- World Boardgaming Championships, an annual convention

== Other uses ==
- White blood cell, part of the immune system
- WBC hive, a type of artificial beehive
- Waterbeach railway station, station code WBC, in Cambridgeshire, England
- Westboro Baptist Church, a small unaffiliated US church considered to be a hate group
- The Word Biblical Commentary, a series of analyses of the Bible
