= Wint =

WINT or Wint may refer to:

== Broadcast stations ==
- WANE-TV, a television station (channel 15) licensed to Fort Wayne, Indiana, United States, which identified as WINT from 1954 to 1957
- WCPT-TV, a television station (channel 20) licensed to Crossville, Tennessee, United States, which identified as WINT-TV from 1982 to 1983
- WINT (AM), a radio station (1330 AM) licensed to Willoughby, Ohio, United States
- WLZR, a radio station (1560 AM) licensed to Melbourne, Florida, United States, which identified as WINT from 2003 to 2012
- WPCV, a radio station (97.5 FM) licensed to Winter Haven, Florida, United States, which identified as WINT-FM from 1963 to 1967.

== Locations ==
- Fort Wint, on Grande Island, in the Philippines
- DeWint House, in Rockland County, New York, United States

== People ==
=== Surnamed "Wint" ===
- Arthur Wint (1920–1992), first Jamaican Olympic gold medallist
- Maurice Dean Wint (born 1964), British-Canadian actor
- Peter De Wint (1784–1849), British landscape painter
- Arthur De Wint Foote (1849–1933), U.S. civil engineer

=== Nicknamed "Wint" ===
- Winton A. Winter Sr. (1930–2013), U.S. politician
- @dril, also known as wint, a popular Twitter user known for his idiosyncratic humor

== Fictional characters ==
- Mr. Wint, a James Bond villain

== See also ==
- WIN-T (disambiguation)
- Theodore Wint Grave, a 1908 grave in Arlington National Cemetery known for its artwork
