= Isabel Thomas =

British author of science books

Isabel Thomas is a British author of science books for children. She has written more than 150 books.

== Books ==
Her books include:

- This Book is Not Rubbish: 50 Ways to Ditch Plastic, Reduce Rubbish and Save the World! (2018), about how children can make their lives more eco-friendly. An American version of the book was titled This Book Is Not Garbage: 50 Ways to Ditch Plastic, Reduce Trash, and Save the World!
- Moth: An Evolution Story (2019), about the evolution of the peppered moth, illustrated by Daniel Egnéus. It won the 2020 AAAS/Subaru prize for excellence in science Books for children’s science picture books.
- Exploring the Elements: A Complete Guide to the Periodic Table (2020), illustrated by Sara Gillingham.
- Fox: A Circle of Life Story (2020), a picture book about the death of a mother fox, illustrated by Daniel Egnéus. It tells a scientific story about what happens to a body after death. The Guardian called it "the perfect book for talking to children about death."
- The Bedtime Book of Impossible Questions (2022), according to the Lancashire Evening Post, "the perfect brain-soothing bedtime book for your busy little bees."
- Frog: A Story of Life on Earth (2025), illustrated by Daniel Egnéus, won the 2026 United Kingdom Literacy Association Award in the Information Books category.

Her work has been translated into more than 30 languages.

== Other work ==
She is a writer for Whizz Pop Bang and The Week Junior Science + Nature, British science magazines for children.

== Personal life ==
As of 2025, Thomas is married and has three children. She lives near Cambridge.
