= Kitt Peak National Observatory =

United States astronomical observatory

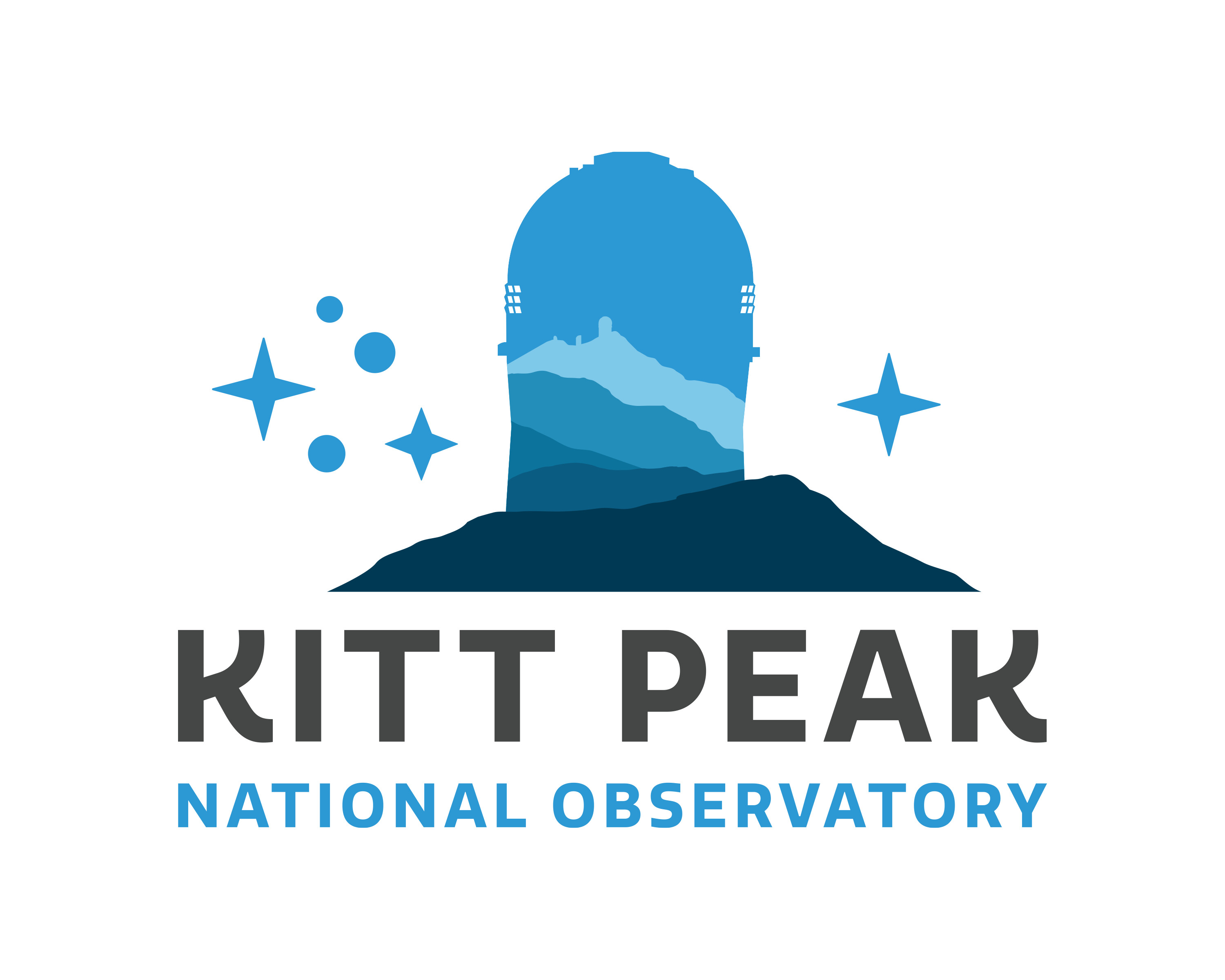

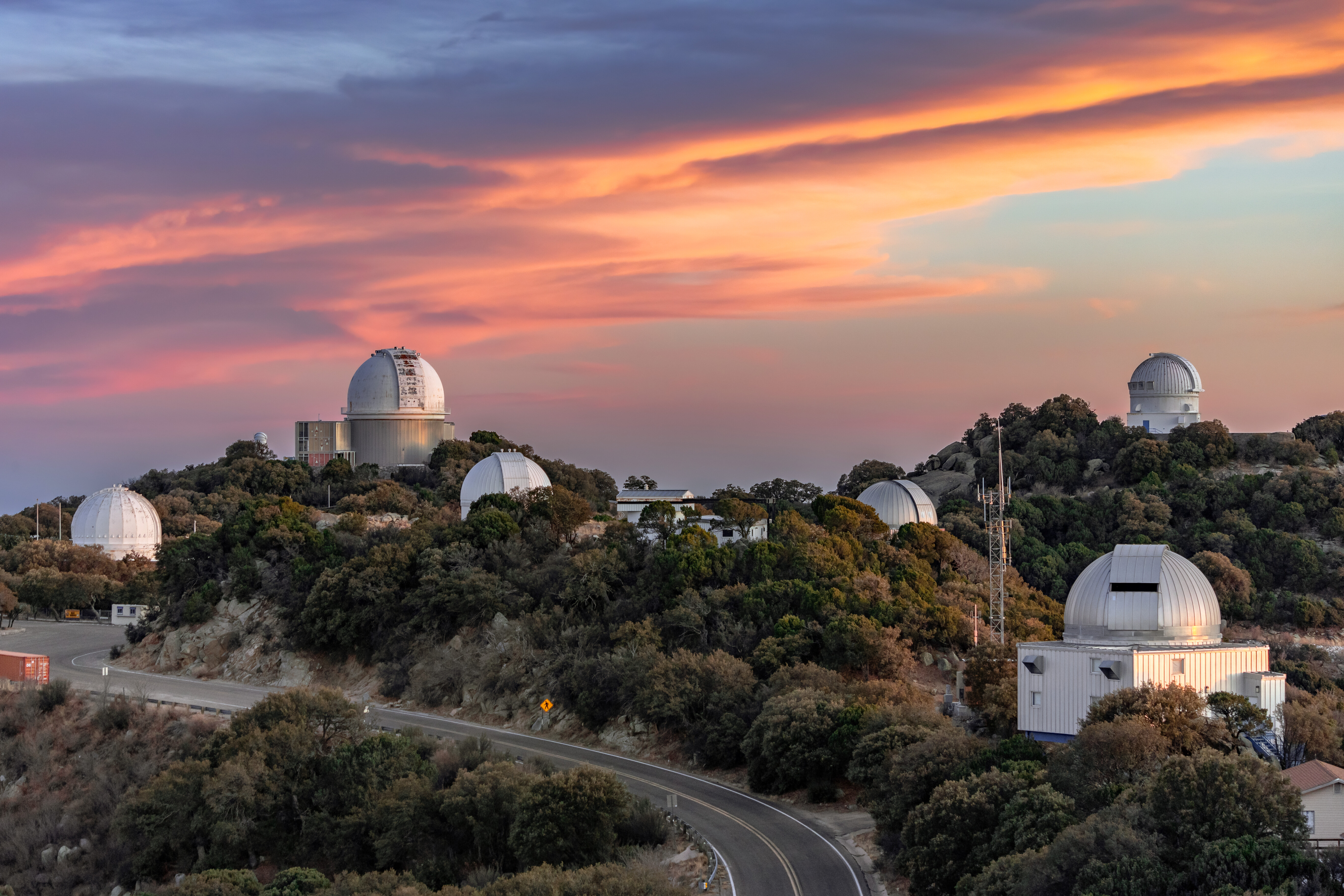
- Various telescopes at the Kitt Peak National Observatory (KPNO) in the Quinlan Mountains
- Alternative names: KPNO
- Organization: Association of Universities for Research in Astronomy
- Observatory code: 695
- Location: Kitt Peak, Arizona, US
- Coordinates: 31°57′30″N 111°35′48″W
- Altitude: 2,096 m (6,877 ft)
- Observing time: 260 nights per year
- Established: 1958
- Website: noirlab.edu/public/programs/kitt-peak-national-observatory/

Telescopes
- KPNO Nicholas U. Mayall Telescope: 4.0 m Ritchey–Chrétien reflector
- WIYN Telescope: 3.5 m Ritchey–Chrétien reflector
- McMath–Pierce solar telescope: Unobstructed solar reflector
- KPNO 2.1 m Telescope: Fourth largest on the mountain
- Coudé Feed Tower: Coudé spectrograph
- NEID Solar Telescope: Obtains disk-integrated light for a spectrograph
- Coronado Array: Three commercially produced Meade/Coronado solar instruments used for public education
- RCT Consortium Telescope: Robotically controlled
- WIYN 0.9 m Telescope: Galactic studies
- SOLARIO remote telescope: Astrophotography
- CWRU Burrell Schmidt: Galactic studies
- SARA Observatory 0.9m telescope: Variable stars, undergraduate training
- Visitor Center telescopes: Three instruments used for nightly public programs
- Spacewatch 1.8 m Telescope: 72 in mirror scavenged from the Mount Hopkins MMT
- Spacewatch 0.9 m Telescope: Spacewatch
- Super-LOTIS: Designed to look for visible signatures of GRBs
- Auxiliary solar telescopes: Two 0.9 m instruments
- Bok Telescope: Versatile
- MDM Observatory 1.3 m McGraw-Hill Telescope: Originally at Ann Arbor
- MDM Observatory 2.4 m Hiltner Telescope: Galactic surveys
- ARO 12m Radio Telescope: One of two telescopes operated by the Arizona Radio Observatory, part of Steward Observatory
- VLBA: One of ten radio-telescopes forming the VLBA
- DIMM all-sky camera: monitors seeing
- Related media on Commons

The Kitt Peak National Observatory (KPNO) is a United States astronomical observatory located on Kitt Peak of the Quinlan Mountains in the Arizona-Sonoran Desert on the Tohono Oʼodham Nation, 88 kilometers (55 mi) west-southwest of Tucson, Arizona. With more than twenty optical and two radio telescopes, it is one of the largest gatherings of astronomical instruments in the Earth's northern hemisphere.

Kitt Peak National Observatory was founded in 1958. It is home to what was the largest solar telescope in the world, and many large astronomical telescopes of the late 20th century in the United States.

The observatory was administered by the National Optical Astronomy Observatory (NOAO) from the early 1980s until 2019, after which it was overseen by NOIRLab.

== General information ==
Kitt Peak was selected by its first director, Aden B. Meinel, in 1958 as the site for a national observatory under contract with the National Science Foundation (NSF) and was administered by the Association of Universities for Research in Astronomy. The land was leased from the Tohono Oʼodham under a perpetual agreement. The second director (1960 to 1971) was Nicholas U. Mayall. In 1982, NOAO was formed to consolidate the management of three optical observatories — Kitt Peak; the National Solar Observatory facilities at Kitt Peak and Sacramento Peak, New Mexico; and the Cerro Tololo Inter-American Observatory in Chile. The observatory sites are under lease from the Tohono O'odham Nation at the amount of a quarter dollar per acre yearly, which was overwhelmingly approved by the Council in the 1950s. In 2005, the Tohono O'odham Nation brought suit against the National Science Foundation to stop further construction of gamma ray detectors in the Gardens of the Sacred Tohono O'odham Spirit I'itoi, which are just below the summit.

The largest optical instruments at KPNO are the Mayall 4 meter telescope and the WIYN 3.5-meter telescope; there are also several two- and one-meter class telescopes. The McMath–Pierce solar telescope was for many decades the largest solar telescope in the world and the largest unobstructed reflector (no secondary mirror in the path of incoming light). The ARO 12m Radio Telescope is also at the location.

Kitt Peak is famous for hosting the first telescope (an old 91 cm reflector) used to search for near-Earth asteroids, and calculating the probability of an impact with planet Earth.

Kitt Peak hosts an array of programs for the public to take part in, including:

- Daytime tours, speaking about the history of the observatory as well as touring a major research telescope.
- The Nightly Observing Program (NOP), which allows visitors to arrive in the late afternoon, watch the sunset, and use binoculars and telescopes to view the cosmos.
- Additionally, there is the Overnight Telescope Observing Program (OTOP). This program allows for a one-on-one, full night of observing using any of the visitor center's telescopes. Guests may choose to do DSLR imaging, CCD imaging, or simply take in the sights with their eye to the telescope.

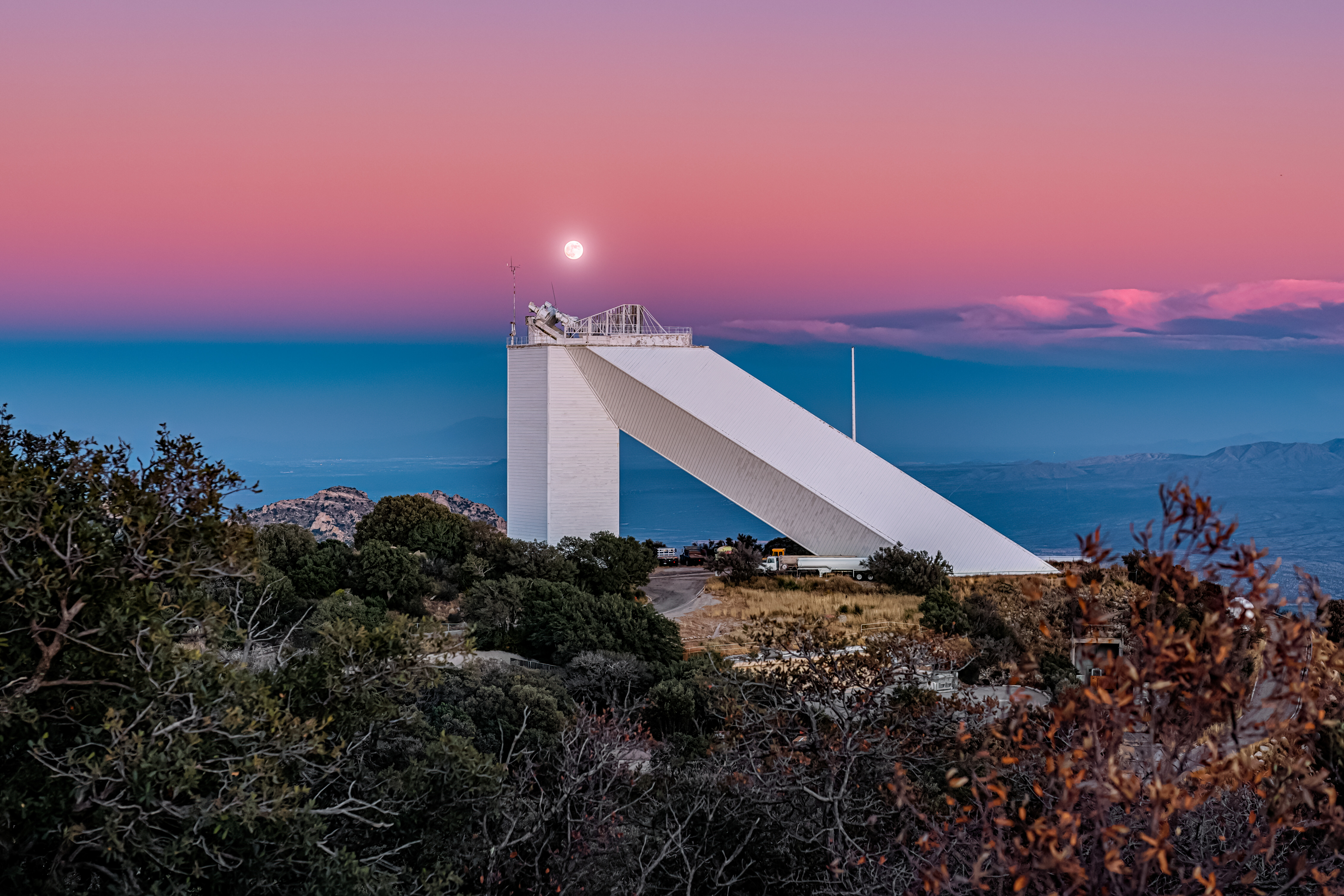
The McMath-Pierce Solar Telescope

Kitt Peak's Southeastern Association for Research and Astronomy (SARA) Telescope was featured in the WIPB-PBS documentary, "Seeing Stars in Indiana". The project followed SARA astronomers from Ball State University to the observatory and featured time-lapse images from various points around Kitt Peak.

A major project started in the 2010s is the Dark Energy Spectroscopic Instrument (DESI) for the 4-meter Mayall telescope, for conducting spectrographic astronomical surveys of distant galaxies probing the expansion history of the universe and the mysterious physics of dark energy. Another major project is the NN-EXPLORE Exoplanet Investigations with Doppler Spectroscopy (NEID), which started in 2018. NEID is an extremely precise radial-velocity spectrograph on the WIYN 3.5-meter telescope.

== History ==
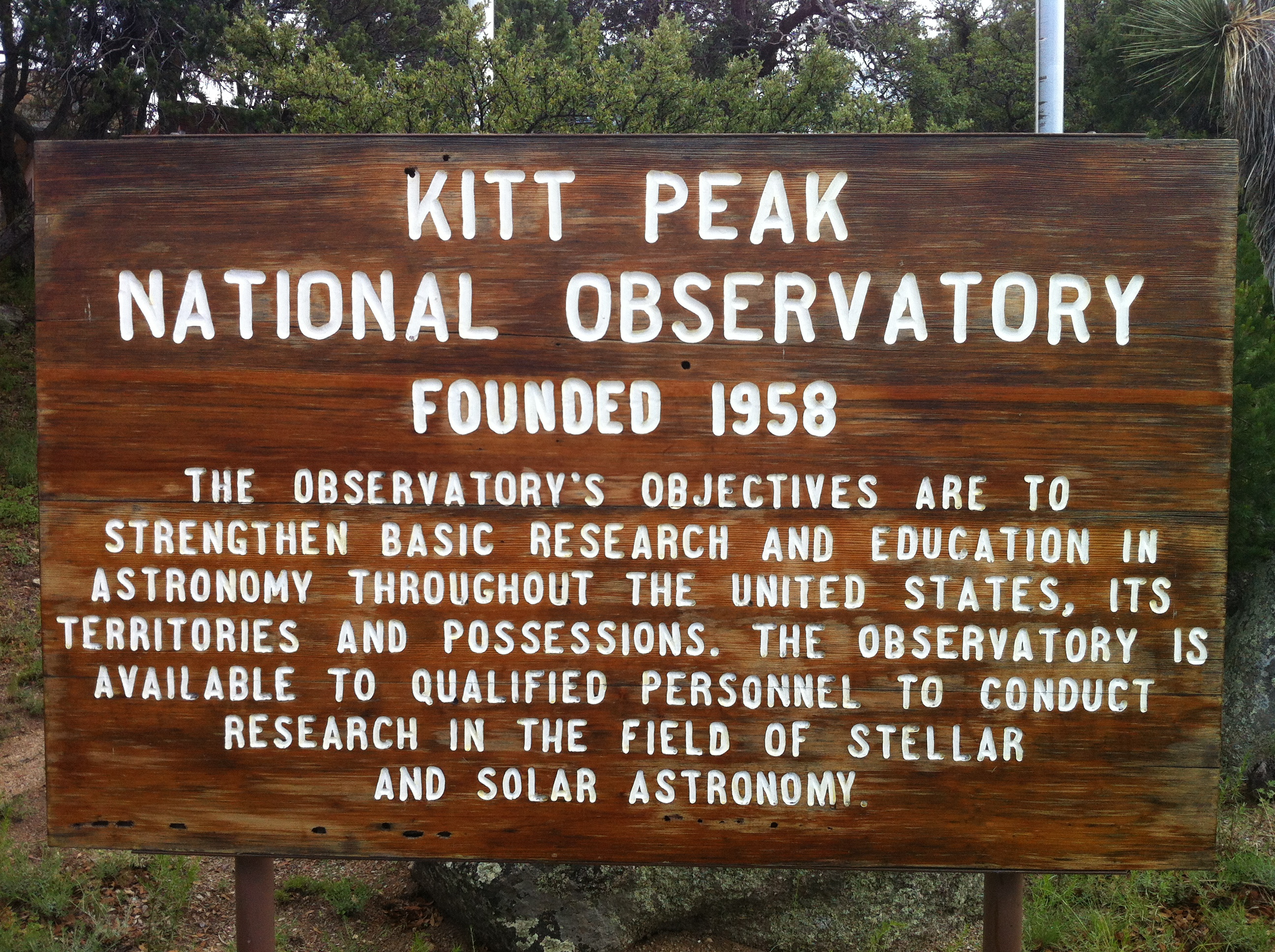
Sign at Kitt Peak National Observatory

The Kitt Peak National Observatory of the United States was dedicated on March 16, 1960. At the dedication a 36-inch telescope and various facilities were ready. Construction was underway for the then planned 84 inch telescope. (i.e. the KPNO 2.1 meter)

The 84 inch (2.1 m) had its first light in September 1964.

Over the decades the mountaintop hosted many telescopes, and achieved a variety of discoveries. Some examples of astronomical research KPNO contributed to include the study of dark matter, cosmic distances, high-redshift galaxies, and the Boötes Void. In addition, the observatory has engaged in variety of public outreach and education programs.

In 2018, KPNO established plans for its Windows on the Universe Center for Astronomy Outreach.

In June 2022, the Contreras Fire led to the evacuation of Kitt Peak. The fire reached the summit at 2 a.m. on Friday, June 17. Four non-scientific buildings, including a dormitory, were lost in the fire. By October 7th, most telescopes and key scientific instruments returned to service. 15 months later in September 2023, the observatory reopened to the public.

== Notable discoveries ==
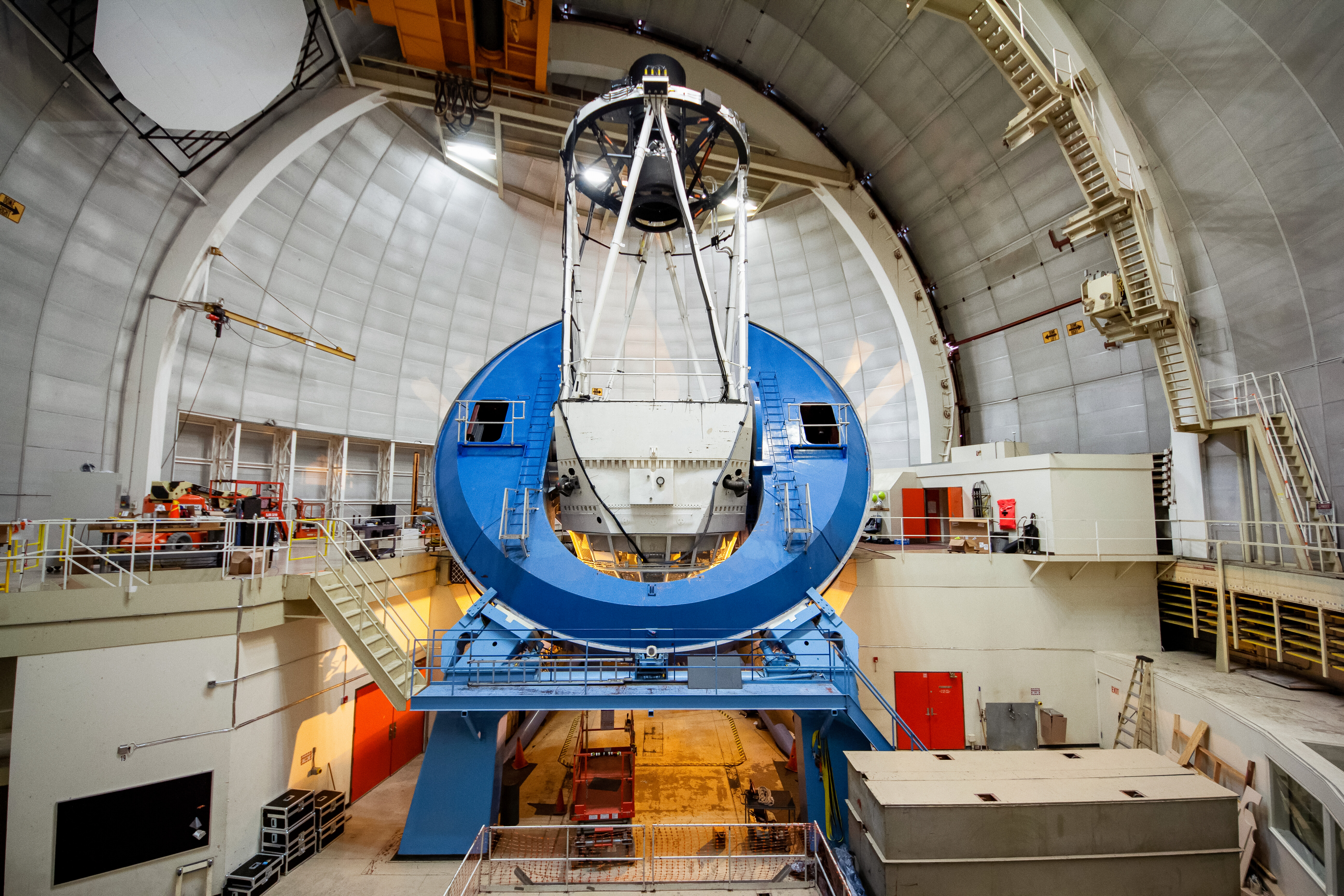
The Mayall 4-meter telescope

In 1976 the Mayall Telescope was used to discover methane ice on Pluto.

The 90 cm Spacewatch telescope was used to discover the Kuiper belt body, 20000 Varuna in the year 2000. This was discovered by an astronomer noticing the slow moving object in a blink comparison.

Through the NEID program, TOI-3757 b, the lowest-density gas giant to be found around a red dwarf star, was discovered in 2022.

The DESI Legacy Imaging Surveys map, the largest of its kind when released in 2026, covered three quarters of the sky and included nearly four billion objects. The map included data from the Mayall z-band Legacy Survey, which took place at the Mayall 4 meter telescope.

== Climate ==
Due to its high elevation, the observatory experiences a subtropical highland climate (Cfb) with a much cooler and wetter climate throughout the year than most of the Sonoran Desert.

== Facilities ==
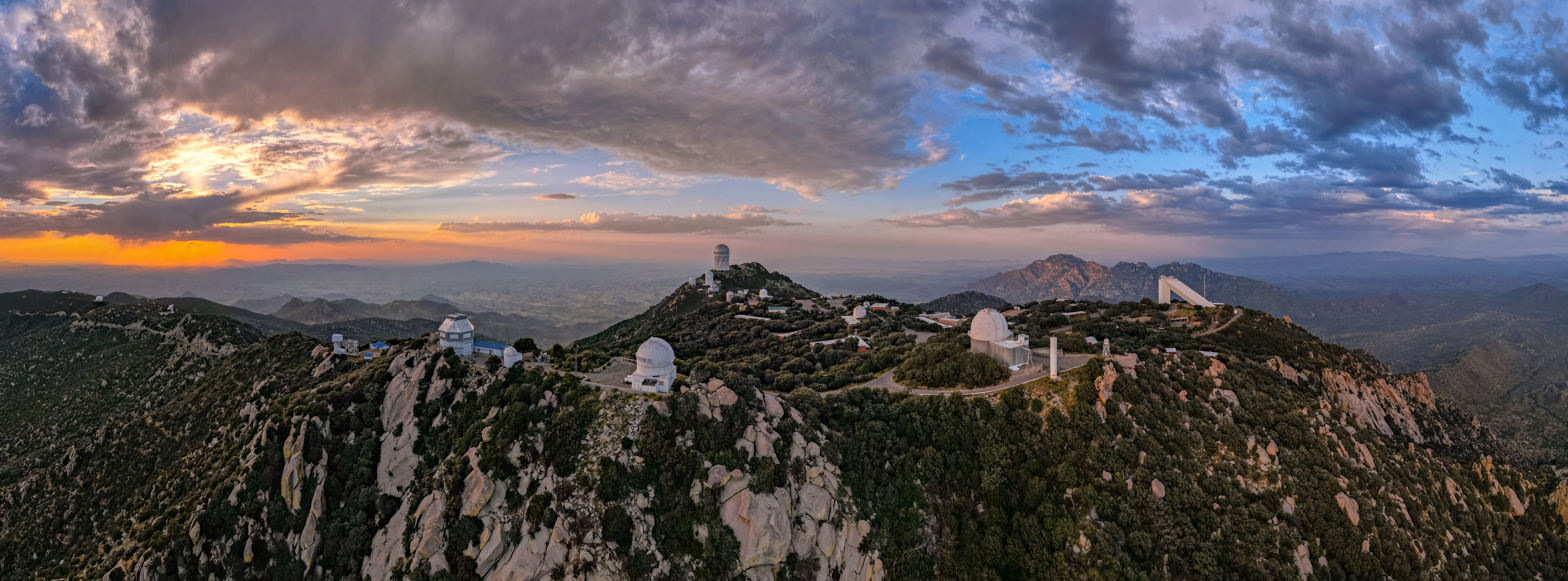
A view of Kitt Peak showing most of the 19 research telescopes

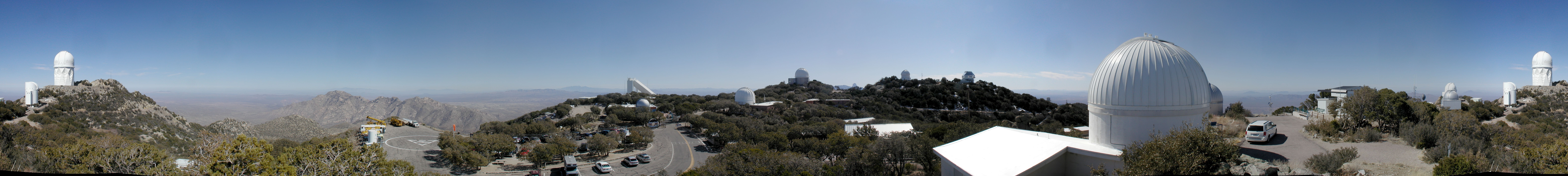
380° panorama of Kitt Peak from the Warner and Swasey Observatory

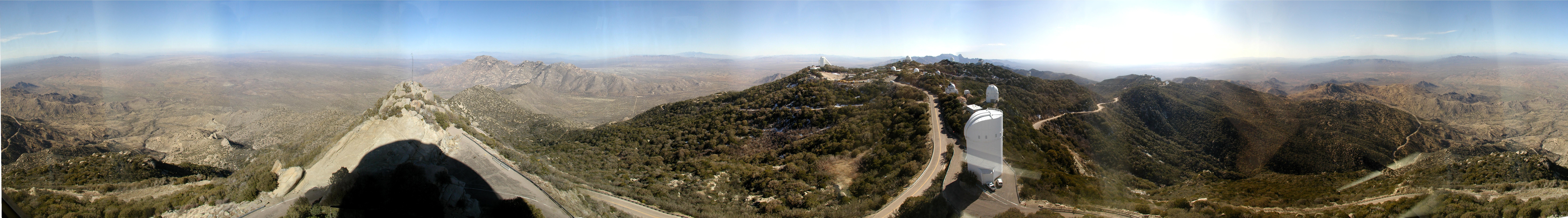
400° panorama from Kitt Peak's Mayall 4-meter Observatory

Climate data for Kitt Peak, Arizona (Elevation 6,790ft)
| Month | Jan | Feb | Mar | Apr | May | Jun | Jul | Aug | Sep | Oct | Nov | Dec | Year |
|---|---|---|---|---|---|---|---|---|---|---|---|---|---|
| Record high °F (°C) | 71 (22) | 75 (24) | 78 (26) | 88 (31) | 90 (32) | 98 (37) | 98 (37) | 94 (34) | 91 (33) | 89 (32) | 87 (31) | 72 (22) | 98 (37) |
| Mean daily maximum °F (°C) | 49.6 (9.8) | 50.8 (10.4) | 54.3 (12.4) | 61.7 (16.5) | 70.4 (21.3) | 79.5 (26.4) | 80.4 (26.9) | 78.0 (25.6) | 74.9 (23.8) | 66.9 (19.4) | 56.8 (13.8) | 50.0 (10.0) | 64.4 (18.0) |
| Mean daily minimum °F (°C) | 33.0 (0.6) | 33.6 (0.9) | 35.8 (2.1) | 41.3 (5.2) | 49.2 (9.6) | 58.5 (14.7) | 60.8 (16.0) | 59.8 (15.4) | 57.0 (13.9) | 48.6 (9.2) | 39.5 (4.2) | 33.7 (0.9) | 45.9 (7.7) |
| Record low °F (°C) | −3 (−19) | −2 (−19) | 9 (−13) | 15 (−9) | 24 (−4) | 33 (1) | 40 (4) | 42 (6) | 35 (2) | 20 (−7) | 12 (−11) | 6 (−14) | −3 (−19) |
| Average precipitation inches (mm) | 1.77 (45) | 1.60 (41) | 1.80 (46) | 0.55 (14) | 0.44 (11) | 0.45 (11) | 4.38 (111) | 4.53 (115) | 2.36 (60) | 1.50 (38) | 1.14 (29) | 2.65 (67) | 23.16 (588) |
| Average snowfall inches (cm) | 3.0 (7.6) | 4.3 (11) | 4.1 (10) | 1.2 (3.0) | 0.1 (0.25) | 0.0 (0.0) | 0.0 (0.0) | 0.0 (0.0) | 0.0 (0.0) | 0.3 (0.76) | 1.2 (3.0) | 3.8 (9.7) | 18.1 (46) |
Source: The Western Regional Climate Center

== See also ==
- List of astronomical observatories
- List of radio telescopes
- List of telescope types
- Richard Green (astronomer)
