= WTC =

WTC may stand for:

== Buildings ==
- Warrenton Training Center, a classified U.S. government complex in Virginia, United States
- World Trade Center (disambiguation)
- Wortham Theater Center, performing arts center in Houston, Texas, United States

== Arts, entertainment, and media ==
- The Well-Tempered Clavier, a collection of preludes and fugues for keyboard by Johann Sebastian Bach
- Waking the Cadaver, an American slam death metal band from New Jersey
- When They Cry, a Japanese video game series
- WTC 9/11, 2009 composition by Steve Reich
- Wu-Tang Clan, an American hip-hop group

== Education ==
- West Toronto Collegiate, a former public high school in Toronto, Ontario, Canada
- Western Technical College, a vocational-technical school in La Crosse, Wisconsin, United States
- Westminster Theological Centre, a UK-based accredited theological college

== Other uses ==
- World Test Championship, a league competition for test cricket run by the International Cricket Council
- Wilderness Travel Course, an American program run by the Sierra Club that teaches basic mountaineering skills
- Willingness to communicate, in second-language acquisition
- Women's Timber Corps, a British civilian organisation created during the Second World War to work in forestry
- Working tax credit, a state benefit in the United Kingdom made to people who work and have a low income
- World Taiwanese Congress, an annual meeting for organizations promoting formal Taiwan independence
- World Triathlon Corporation, an American for-profit corporation that runs several Triathlon, Ironman, and cycling races
