= WMI =

WMI may refer to:

== Organisations ==
- Washington Mutual Inc, a former savings bank holding company
- Waste Management, Inc (former NYSE symbol), a provider of waste management services
- Water Missions International, an engineering organization providing safe water and sanitation following natural disasters
- West Michigan Railroad (reporting mark)
- Former World Medicine Institute, Honolulu, Hawaii, US, previously Tai Hsuan Foundation College of Acupuncture & Herbal Medicine

== Other ==
- Windows Management Instrumentation, Microsoft extensions to the Windows Driver Model
- WMI (window manager), later wmii, Window Manager Improved, for X Window System
- World manufacturer identifier in a Vehicle Identification Number
- Working Memory Index, part of the Wechsler Intelligence Scale for Children
- Warsaw Modlin Airport, Poland, IATA code
