= Wyciągając Rękę Po... Dobry Ynteres =

Studio album by WC
- Released: 1994
- Recorded: 1994
- Genre: Punk rock
- Length: ???
- Label: Silver-Ton
- Producer: ???

WC chronology
Wyciągając Rękę Po... Dobry Ynteres (1994)	Archiwum (2002)

Wyciągając Rękę Po... Dobry Ynteres is the first album of Polish punk rock band WC. The album was released only as an MC.

== Track listing ==
=== A side ===
1. Bodziu Wyłącz Tamten Wzmacniacz (part I)
2. Walka O Przetrwanie
3. Masturbacja
4. Szczęście
5. Agresja
6. Jestem Tank
7. Al-Afrat
8. Nie Chcę Za Was Umierać

=== B side ===
1. Bez Sensu
2. Nowo-Nowe...
3. Stagnacja?
4. Ja
5. Ballada O Twoim Ryju
6. Blitzkrieg
7. Łazienka
8. Bodziu Wyłącz Tamten Wzmacniacz (part II)

== Resource ==
- Band's official site URL accessed at 23 August 2006
