= WSC =

WSC may refer to:

== Organizations ==
=== Business ===
- WSC (cyclecar), a Scottish automobile manufacturer
- WSC (radio station), a defunct marine coast station in Massachusetts and New Jersey, US
- Wesco Financial, a financial corporation (stock symbol WSC)
- World Shipping Council, an industry group
- World Standards Cooperation, an alliance of the IEC, ISO and ITU international standardization organizations

=== Sports clubs ===
- Washington Sports Clubs, a division of New York City-based TSI Holdings
- Wiener Sportclub, an athletics club in Vienna

=== Other organizations ===
- Weinheimer Senioren-Convent, a German student association
- Westminster Seminary California, a Reformed and Presbyterian Christian graduate school
- Wild Salmon Center, an international conservation organization
- World Scout Conference, a world conference of scouting organizations
- World Sindhi Congress, a non-profit Sindhi advocacy organisation
- World Standards Cooperation, an alliance of the IEC, ISO and ITU international standardization organizations
- World Statistics Congress, a professional association of statisticians

== Science and technology ==
- West Spitsbergen Current, an ocean current
- Western Science Center, a museum in Hemet, California
- White Sands Complex, a government facility in New Mexico, US
- Wiki Science Competition, a global science photography competition
- Winograd Schema Challenge, an AI challenge
- WonderSwan Color, a handheld game console

== Sport and competition ==
- When Saturday Comes, an association football magazine
- World Scholar's Cup, an international team academic competition
- World Scrabble Championship
- World Series Cricket
- World Snooker Championship
- WSC Group, promoter of the TCR Touring Car class
- World Sports Car, a prototype class in the IMSA GT Championship
- World Sportscar Championship
- World Sudoku Championship
- World Solar Challenge, a solar-powered car race
- WorldSkills Competition, an international vocational skill competition

== Other uses ==
- Weekly Shōnen Champion, a Japanese manga magazine
- Winston Spencer Churchill, British Prime Minister
- Wardell Stephen Curry II, American professional basketball player
