= WPB =

WPB may refer to:

- War Production Board, a US government agency in WWII
- War Propaganda Bureau of Britain's Foreign Office in WWI
- Weekly Playboy, Japanese men's magazine
- Weibel–Palade body, storage granules of endothelial cells
- West Palm Beach, Florida, United States, a city
- World Painted Blood, a 2009 album by the thrash metal band Slayer
- Waste paper basket
- The hull classification symbol of an Island-class patrol boat of the US Coast Guard
- Port Bergé Airport, Madagascar
- World Prison Brief, database of prison systems throughout the world
- Whizz Pop Bang, a science magazine for children

== Political parties ==
- Workers Party of Bangladesh
- Workers' Party of Belgium
- Workers Party of Britain

== See also ==
- WP:B
