= WCS =

WCS may refer to:

== Computing and technology ==
- Warehouse control system, a software application
- Web Coverage Service, interface standard for digital geospatial information
- WebSphere Commerce Suite, a software platform framework for e-commerce
- Windows Color System, a software color management technology in Windows Vista and onwards
- Writeable Control Store, memory used to load the operating system of the Amiga 1000

== Education ==
- Wayne Community School District, or Wayne Community Schools, in Iowa, U.S.
- Whitinsville Christian School, in Whitinsville, Massachusetts, U.S.
- Wichita Collegiate School, in Wichita, Kansas, U.S.
- Wilcox County School District (Georgia), U.S.
- Williamson County Schools, in Tennessee, U.S.
- Wycliffe Christian School, in Warrimoo, New South Wales, Australia

== Other uses ==
- Waste collection system, the space toilet on the Space Shuttle
- Waste Control Specialists, a nuclear waste disposal company
- West Coast Swing, a swing dance
- Western Canadian Select, a heavy crude oil stream in North America
- Wildlife Conservation Society, a US-based international wildlife organisation
- Williams–Campbell syndrome, a disease of the airways
- Wireless Communications Service, a US and Canadian set of frequency bands
- World Cosplay Summit, an annual international cosplay event
- StarCraft II World Championship Series, esports competition for StarCraft II

== See also ==
- WC (disambiguation)
