= War Bureau of Consultants =

The War Bureau of Consultants (WBC) was a committee of 12 prominent scientists and several government consultants put together in November 1941 to investigate the feasibility of a U.S. bio-weapons program. The bureau's recommendations led to the creation of an official U.S. biological weapons program during World War II.

== Background ==
Despite World War I-era interest in ricin, as World War II erupted the United States Army still maintained the position that biological warfare (BW) was, for the most part, impractical. Secretary of War Henry Stimson was mindful of Imperial Germany's BW attack on the Romanian Cavalry using glanders during World War I and of its saboteurs introducing the disease into the United States among the military horses and mules being shipped to Europe (see Anton Dilger). It was also understood that intelligence reports (erroneous as it later turned out) clearly stated that Nazi Germany had a BW capability. Other nations, notably France, Japan and the United Kingdom, had also begun their own BW programs. However, by the outbreak of World War II the U.S. still had no biological weapons capabilities.

== History ==
=== Creation ===
The WBC was formed in 1941. The Bureau was formed after a July 1941 meeting of representatives from the Office of Scientific Research and Development, the Chemical Warfare Service, the Surgeon General, and U.S. Army Intelligence. That meeting recommended that the U.S. further study the threat of bio-weapons and the feasibility of a U.S. biological weapons program. Secretary of War Henry L. Stimson requested that Frank B. Jewett, head of the National Academy of Sciences, issue a report on the topic. Jewett passed the task on to Edwin Broun Fred, a University of Wisconsin bacteriologist.

Fred formed the WBC which consisted of himself and 12 prominent scientists. In addition the WBC included liaisons from the Chemical Warfare Service, U.S. Army Ordnance Corps, the U.S. Navy Bureau of Medicine and Surgery, the U.S. Army Surgeon's General Office, the U.S. Department of Agriculture and the U.S. Public Health Service. The War Bureau of Consultants' work was to be conducted in extreme secrecy.

The WBC met for the first time on November 18, 1941, at the National Academy of Sciences in Washington, D.C. At that meeting it was decided that the WBC would perform a literature search building up to their report. Between the WBC's first meeting and its first report Pearl Harbor was bombed and reports began trickling in about the Japanese biological attack on the Chinese village of Changteh.

=== 1942 report ===
On February 17, 1942, the WBC produced and released its first formal report. The document was over 200 pages long, included 13 appendices, and an 89-page annotated bibliography. The report laid out the results of the WBC's literature search, which showed that there was relatively widespread interest in proposals geared toward BW.

The report also made some key recommendations. The WBC recommended that the United States take seriously the threat of biological warfare and take steps to defend itself. Among those steps were the development of vaccines, and protection of the water supplies. The consultants reported that a U.S. bio-weapons program was a feasible goal. Their report also concluded that the United States should take steps to develop its own offensive biological warfare capability.

=== Response ===
Stimson forwarded the report, and his summary of its contents, to U.S. President Franklin Roosevelt on April 29, 1942. His summary emphasized the danger of biological weapons as well as the U.S. need for offensive and defensive biological capabilities.

The value of biological warfare [wrote Stimson] will be a debatable question until it has been clearly proven or disproved by experiences. The wide assumption is that any method which appears to offer advantages to a nation at war will be vigorously employed by that nation. There is but one logical course to pursue, namely, to study the possibilities of such warfare from every angle, make every preparation for reducing its effectiveness, and thereby reduce the likelihood of its use.

As a result of the recommendations made by the WBC, Roosevelt ordered Stimson to create the War Research Service to oversee the official, and secret, U.S. biological weapons program.
