= WAAF =

WAAF may refer to:

- Women's Auxiliary Air Force, a British military service in World War II
  - Waaf, a member of the service
- w3af (Web application attack and audit framework), an open-source web application security scanner
- WAAF (AM), a radio station (910 AM) licensed to Scranton, Pennsylvania, United States
- WKVB (FM), a radio station (107.3 FM) licensed to Westborough, Massachusetts, United States, which used the WAAF call letters from 1968 to 2020
- West Austin Antenna Farm, an antenna farm located west in Austin, Texas, United States
- Wheeler Army Airfield
