= WEM =

Wem may refer to:

- HMS Wem (1919), a WWI Royal Navy minesweeper
- Weem, a village in Perthshire, Scotland
- Wem, a small town in Shropshire, England
- Wem (musician), hip hop musician

WEM may stand for:

- County Westmeath, Ireland, Chapman code
- Watkins Electric Music, a British manufacturer of musical instruments and equipment
- Wells Regional Transportation Center, code of a train station in Maine, US
- West Edmonton Mall, Alberta, Canada
- Wwise Encoded Media, a file format by Audiokinetic Wwise.
