= VVO =

VVO may refer to:

- An abbreviation for the Verkehrsverbund Oberelbe, a public transport association for the area around Dresden in Germany
- The IATA code for Vladivostok International Airport in Russia
- The VVO astronomical catalog
- The Vaterländischer Verdienstorden, the Patriotic Order of Merit, an award in the former East Germany
- Vesiculo-vacuolar organelle, a structure in endothelial cells
- VVO Group, former name of Kojamo, a Finnish real estate investment company
