= WACC =

WACC may refer to:

- Weighted average cost of capital
- World Amateur Chess Championship
- World Association for Christian Communication
- WACC (AM), a radio station (830 AM) licensed to Hialeah, Florida, United States
- WACC-LP, a low-power radio station (107.7 FM) licensed to Enfield, Connecticut, United States
- Warrensburg Area Career Center, a school in Warrensburg, Missouri, United States.
