= WFF =

WFF may refer to:

== Organisations ==
- Woodhull Freedom Foundation & Federation, advocating for sexual freedom (formed 2003)
- Montreal World Film Festival (1977–2019)
- World Fitness Federation, for bodybuilding (formed 1968)

== Other uses ==
- Wallops Flight Facility, a NASA launch site in Virginia, US
- Well-formed formula, in logic
- World's Funniest Fails, a 2015 American TV series

== See also ==
- WFF 'N PROOF, a 1962 logic game
