= WB =

WB, Wb, or wb may refer to:

== Businesses and organizations ==
- Warner Bros. Discovery, an American mass media conglomerate
- Warner Bros., a large American film and television company
  - The WB, an American television network from 1995 to 2006
  - WB Channel, an Indian channel from Warner Bros.
- RwandAir, a Rwandan airline whose International Air Transport Association code is "WB"
- Wachovia, an American banking chain whose former New York Stock Exchange IP was "WB"
- W.B. Mason, an American office supply company
- World Balance, a Filipino shoe company
- World Bank Group, an international finance organization
- World Boxing, an international boxing governing body
- World Bowling, the international governing body for nine-pin and ten-pin bowling
- WildBlue, an American satellite internet service provider
- Waagner-Biro, an Austrian company
- Wild Bunch (company), a film financer from France
- Wildberries, a Russian online store
- We Citizens (Germany), abbreviated WB for Wir Bürger, a German political party
- The World Bank, an international financial institution that provides loans and grants to governments of low- and middle-income countries

== Places ==
- West Bengal, a state in eastern India, whose ISO abbreviation is "IN-WB"
- West Bank of the river Jordan, a disputed region in the Middle East

== Science ==
- Weber (unit) (Wb), the SI unit of magnetic flux
- Western blot, a medical diagnosis tool
- White balance, a technical term in color photography
- Woronin body, a microbody in the hyphae of filamentous Ascomycota
- Wörterbuch der ägyptischen Sprache, the standard dictionary of Ancient Egyptian, published 1926–1963, in bibliographies
- Writeback, a procedure conducted by a computer cache
- Wet bulb, a temperature definition
- Weather band, a VHF frequency band used in North America

== Sport ==
- Waasland-Beveren, Belgian football club
- Warmbloods, a group of middle-weight horse types and breeds, primarily originating in Europe
- Western Bulldogs, an Australian rules football club
- Wing-back (association football), a position in association football

== Other ==
- Wikibooks, a Wikimedia project
