= WPK =

WPK could refer to:

- Workers' Party of Korea, ruling party of North Korea
- Winter Park (Amtrak station), Florida, United States; Amtrak Station Code WPK
- Wertpapierkennnummer, a German securities identification code
- Workers' Party of Kampuchea, later Khmer Rouge
