= WL =

WL may refer to:

== Arts and entertainment ==
- Wario Land: Super Mario Land 3, a Wario Land series video game for the Game Boy
- The Weakest Link, a television program
- White Lies (band), an English indie rock band
- Wisteria Lane, the primary setting of Desperate Housewives
- Westlife, an Irish pop band

== Science and technology ==
- Wavelength, a property of all physical waves
- Wetland, a land area that is saturated with water
- Wetting layer, in nanotechnology
- Windows Live, a set of web services and software from Microsoft
- Wood's lamp, a diagnostic tool used in dermatology
- Working level, a measure of exposure to radon gas
- Wear leveling

== Other uses ==
- World Leader, the athlete with the best mark, time or score worldwide in the current season
- Wehrmacht Luftwaffe, on license plates of the German air force during World War II
- West Lafayette, Indiana
- White Liberal (phrase), a phrase coined by Paul Farmer in Tracy Kidder's 2005 book Mountains Beyond Mountains
- Whole language, a literacy philosophy which emphasizes that children should focus on meaning and strategy instruction
- Wiara Lecha, a former football supporters group in Poland and now an independent football club
- WikiLeaks, a document archive website used by whistleblowers
- Westlaw, a legal database
