= WFD =

WFD may refer to:

== Government ==
- Water Framework Directive, a European Union law
- Westminster Foundation for Democracy, a British public body
- World Food Day, anniversary of the UN Food and Agricultural Organization

== Science and technology ==
- Wi-Fi Direct, a local peer-to-peer networking standard
  - Miracast (or Wi-Fi Display), a part thereof
- Word finding difficulties, in medicine and cognition

== Transport ==
- Fretzdorf station, Brandenburg, Germany (by DS100 code)
- Wallingford station (Connecticut), United States (by Amtrak station code)
- Whitefield railway station (Bengaluru), Karnataka, India (by Indian Railways station code)

== Other uses ==
- World Federation of the Deaf, a non-governmental organisation
- World's Fastest Drummer, a series of sporting competitions
