= WIN-T =

WIN-T may refer to:

- WANE-TV, a television station
- Warfighter Information Network-Tactical, A U.S. Army communications network

== See also ==
- WINT (disambiguation)
