= WC (band) =

- Origin: Poland
- Genres: Punk rock
- Years active: 1981–present
- Labels: Silver-Ton; Złota Skała; Jimmy Jazz
- Members: Skoda; Billy; Paweł; Jaromir; Lech

WC is a Polish punk rock band playing since 1981.

== History ==
WC debuted in 1981 on Rock Youth Meeting in Miastko. After the concert organised for the anniversary of the end of World War II in 1982 the band loses the place for rehearsals. After that WC had to practice in parks and forests. In 1982, band appeared on following events: 3rd Polish Young Generation Contest, Punk Invasion '82, 2nd Music Camping. Two years later, during the rehearsal in MGOK Miastko material for their album Archiwum was recorded. In 1985, the band suspends operation.

In 1991, pirate label released two unofficial albums (Nasza Wojna and Agresja) which contained material from 1984 rehearsal. 1993 brought reactivation of the band. The first concert took place one year later. At this time the band recorded material for Wyciągając Rękę Po... Dobry Ynteres. Until release of the Archiwum in 1997 band played many successful concerts. In 2005, the album is re-released on CD and the band started the new tour.

== Members ==
=== Current ===
- Skoda - guitar
- Jaromir - vocals
- Paweł - bass guitar
- Billy - drums
- Lech - guitar

=== Former ===
- Wiesław Obwieś Wójtowicz (guitar)
- Leszek Dzidziuś Weiss (guitar, vocals)
- Maciej Gulasz Kupiec (drums)

== Discography ==
- Wyciągając Rękę Po... Dobry Ynteres (1994)
- Archiwum (1997, MC release)
- Archiwum (2005, CD re-release)
