= Wiki Loves Folklore =

Annual photography contest

- Official logo of Wiki Loves Folklore
- Genre: Photography
- Begins: 1 February
- Ends: 31 March
- Location: Worldwide
- Years active: 7
- Inaugurated: 2019
- Most recent: 2025
- Participants: Photographers
- Organiser: Wikipedia community members
- Website: Wikilovesfolklore.org

Wiki Loves Folklore (WLF) is an annual international photographic competition held during the month of February, and organised worldwide by Wikimedia community members with the help of local Wikimedia affiliates and Wikipedians across the globe. Participants take pictures of local folk culture and intangible heritage in their region, and upload them to Wikimedia Commons. The aim of this event is to document folklore traditions around the world with the goal of encouraging people to capture the media of their local Folk culture, and to put them under a free licence which can then be re-used not only in Wikipedia but everywhere by everyone.

== See also ==
- Wiki Loves Folklore on Wikimedia Commons
- Wiki Loves Love 2019 winners
- Wiki Loves Folklore 2020 winners
- Wiki Loves Folklore 2021 winners
