= WIA =

WIA may refer to:

- Wounded in action
- Winchelsea railway station, Victoria (Station code: WIA)
- Windows Image Acquisition, an image scanner API
- Wireless Institute of Australia, The Wireless Institute of Australia, an amateur radio society
- Workforce Investment Act of 1998, a US Federal Law
- Wellington International Airport, New Zealand
- Wattay International Airport, Laos
- War in Afghanistan
- Wentzville Ice Arena
- Women in Animation
- W.I.A. Wounded in Action, 1966 film

== See also ==
- WEA (disambiguation)
