= WPT (disambiguation) =

The World Poker Tour is a televised poker competition.

WPT may also refer to:

- Westpark Tollway
- Wireless power transfer
- Wisconsin Public Television, the former brand name of PBS Wisconsin
