= WEC =

WEC may stand for:

== Organizations ==
- Westinghouse Electric Company, a multinational company supplying nuclear services, fuel, and power plants
- Wisconsin Elections Commission, an agency that enforces election laws in Wisconsin
- Wisconsin Energy Corporation, a ticker symbol
- Wireless Experimental Centre, a British wartime codebreaking establishment in Delhi, India
- World Energy Council, a multi-energy international organisation
- WEC International, an international Christian mission agency
- Women's Emergency Committee to Open Our Schools, a political action group formed in response to the Little Rock Integration Crisis school closings

== Sports ==
- FIA World Endurance Championship, the FIA sanctioned championship for sports car racing
- FIM Women's European Championship, the FIM sanctioned women's European road racing championship.
- World Enduro Championship, the motorcycle sport world championship
- World Extreme Cagefighting, a defunct mixed martial arts organization in the US
- Wellness and Events Center, an athletics building on the campus of New Jersey Institute of Technology (NJIT)

== Education ==
- Wilmington Enterprise College, Wilmington, Dartford, UK
- Wah Engineering College, Wah Cantt, Punjab, Pakistan

== Other ==
- Whole Earth Catalog, a former American counterculture magazine and product catalog
- WIN Entertainment Centre, Wollongong, Australia
- World Economic Consortium (Crusader), the fictional, world government in the Crusader series of games
- WEC Le Mans, a 1986 racing arcade game by Konami
- Wind Energy Converter, a wind turbine
- Wave Energy Converter, a type of renewable energy device
- White etching cracks, a deformation mechanism in bearings
