= Wimp =

Wimp, WIMP, or Wimps may refer to:

== Science and technology ==
- Weakly interacting massive particle, a hypothetical particle of dark matter
- WIMP (computing), the "window, icon, menu, pointer" paradigm
- WIMP (software bundle), the web stack of Windows, IIS, MySQL, and PHP/Perl/Python

== Arts and entertainment ==
- WiMP, a defunct music streaming service
- WURH-CD (former call signs WIMP-LP, WIMP-CA, and WIMP-CD), a television station licensed to serve Miami, Florida, US
- Wimps (band), a US punk rock band
- Wimp, played by Rick Lawless, a character on the TV sitcom Herman's Head

== People ==
- Wimp Sanderson (born 1937), retired basketball coach known as "Wimp"
- Kay Davis or Katherine McDonald Wimp (1920–2012), jazz singer
- Mary Baumgartner, also known as "Wimp" (1930–2018), former female baseball catcher
- derogatory term for a coward

== See also ==
- Farkle (Wimp Out), a dice game that has also been called or is similar to 1000/5000/10000, Cosmic Wimpout, Greed, Hot Dice, Squelch, Zilch, or Zonk
- "The Diary of Horace Wimp", a track on the Electric Light Orchestra album Discovery
- WIMP Argon Programme, a cold dark matter experiment at Laboratori Nazionali del Gran Sasso, Italy
- Wimpy (disambiguation)
