= Walk-off =

Walk-off may refer to:

- Walk-off home run, in baseball
- Walk-off touchdown, in gridiron football
- Walkout, a political or economic protest
  - Cummeragunja walk-off, by Aboriginal people in New South Wales, 1939
  - Wave Hill walk-off, by Gurindji stockmen in the Northern Territory of Australia, 1966
  - 2018 Google walkouts

== See also ==
- Buzzer beater, in a timed sport where the clock, and not the play, determines the end of the game
- Kicks after the siren in Australian rules football
- Sudden death (sports), situations where the next score results in the end of the game
- Walk off the Earth, a Canadian band
