= WFT =

WFT may refer to:

- West Fraser Timber TSX code, a Canadian forestry company
- Weatherford International NYSE code
- Washington Football Team, former temporary name of the NFL team now known as the Washington Commanders
- Wichita Falls, Texas
