= WFP (disambiguation) =

WFP is the World Food Programme, the food-assistance branch of the United Nations.

WFP may also refer to:

== Organizations ==
- Western Forest Products, a Canadian lumber company
- Witness for Peace, US activists against the Reagan administration support for the Contras
- Working Families Party, an American political party

== Other uses ==
- Windows File Protection, a Microsoft Windows security feature
- Windows Filtering Platform, Microsoft Windows network services
- Water-fed pole, a window cleaning tool

== See also ==
- WFPS (disambiguation)
