= WWV =

WWV may refer to:

- The World as Will and Representation, a philosophical book by Arthur Schopenhauer
- Wagner-Werk-Verzeichnis, an index to the musical works of Richard Wagner
- Weera Wickrama Vibhushanaya, a Sri Lanakan military decoration
- WWV (radio station), a shortwave radio station which broadcasts official U.S. Government time signals
- Wayne Wheeled Vehicles, a manufacturer of school buses in the 1990s
- World War Veterans, a progressive organisation of American veterans of World War I
