= Wo Fat =

Wo Fat may refer to:

- A recurring character in the 1968 American police procedural, Hawaii Five-O
- A recurring character in the 2010 American police procedural reboot, Hawaii Five-0
