= WNF =

WNF may refer to:

- Weld neck flange
- West Nile fever
- Wiener Neustädter Flugzeugwerke, aircraft manufacturers of the Bánhidi Gerle
- WNF Wn 11, aircraft designed by the Wiener Neustädter Flugzeugwerke
- Wold Newton family
