= WIPP =

WIPP may refer to:

- Waste Isolation Pilot Plant, a deep geological repository for nuclear waste
- Women in Periodical Publishing (today known as Exceptional Women in Publishing)
- The ICAO airport code assigned for Sultan Mahmud Badaruddin II International Airport in Palembang, Indonesia
