= WHI =

WHI may refer to:

- W Holding Company, a failed bank holding company in Puerto Rico whose former NYSE ticker symbol was WHI
- Walgreens Health Initiatives, a Pharmacy Benefit Management subunit of Walgreens Health Services
- Waterloo Hydrogeologic Inc., a groundwater software, training and consulting company
- Women's Health Initiative, a large, longitudinal study of the health of women.
- Women's Health Issues (journal), an academic journal on women's health
