= WLN =

WLN or wln may refer to:

- Walloon language (ISO 639-2 code)
- Western Library Network, merged into Online Computer Library Center
- West Lothian, council area in Scotland, Chapman code
- Wiswesser Line Notation, system for describing chemical structures
- Work and Learning Network, University of Alberta
