= WNL =

WNL may refer to:

- WNL (broadcaster), a Dutch public broadcasting association
- Weathernews LiVE, a Japanese live streaming channel
- World Ninja League, non-profit promoting Ninja as a sport

== Association football ==
- Women's National League (Ireland), a club competition in the Republic of Ireland
- UEFA Women's Nations League, a competition between national teams in Europe
