= WAAC =

WAAC may refer to:

- WAAC (FM), a radio station (92.9 FM) licensed to Valdosta, Georgia, United States
- WAAC (Nigeria), an airline that succeeded West African Airways Corporation after its folding
- War Artists' Advisory Committee, a British governmental organisation who aimed to compile a visual history of Britain in the Second World War
- Washington-Alexandria Architecture Center, an extension branch of the College of Design and Architecture of Virginia Tech
- West African Airways Corporation
- Western Association for Art Conservation a nonprofit regional membership organization for conservation professionals based in the Western United States
- Win At All Costs - Motto of the West London Lacrosse Club
- Women's Army Auxiliary Corps (Britain), a branch of the British military in the First World War
- Women's Army Corps, once abbreviated WAAC, a branch of the U.S. military in the Second World War
- Women's Art Association of Canada, an organization founded in 1887 to promote and support women artists and craftswomen in Canada
- WFSX (AM), a defunct radio station (1240 AM) formerly licensed to Fort Myers, Florida, United States which held the call sign WAAC from 1942 to 1943
- WIBQ, a radio station (1230 AM) licensed to Terre Haute, Indiana, United States which held the call sign WAAC from 1963 to 1983
