= WK =

WK, W.K., Wk, or Wk. can refer to one of the following:

Businesses and organizations:

- Wolters Kluwer, an information services company (EuroNext code WK)
- American Falcon (IATA airline code WK)
- Edelweiss Air (IATA airline code WK)
- Wikipedia, a collaborative online encyclopedia

Other uses:

- Week
- Wimpy Kid. US fictional character
- Western Kentucky Parkway, a former toll road in Kentucky, now a freeway; often locally called "the WK"
- Scaled Composites White Knight, a developmental aircraft
- WonderKing Online, a popular in-game abbreviation used also in forums
- Wrinkly Kong, an elderly Donkey Kong first seen in Donkey Kong Country. A video game character.
- Third generation Jeep Grand Cherokee, produced from 2005–2010
