= WOA =

WOA may refer to:

== Computing ==
- Web-oriented architecture, a computer systems architectural style
- Windows on ARM (disambiguation), a series of operating systems for ARM architecture computers
- WebObjects application, the file system suffix of an application written using the WebObjects framework from NeXT, later Apple

== Wars ==
- War of Attrition, a conflict between Israel and Egypt
- War of aggression

== Music ==
- Wacken Open Air, the largest exclusively metal music festival in the world
- War of Ages, metalcore band from Pennsylvania

== Sports ==
- World Olympians Association
- Welsh Orienteering Association

== Other uses ==
- World Ocean Atlas
- World of Art, a series of books on art
- the ICAO airline designator for World Airways
