= WC =

WC or wc most often refers to:

- Water closet, or flush toilet

WC or wc may also refer to:

== Arts and entertainment ==
- W.C. (film), an Irish feature film
- WC (band), a Polish punk rock band
- WC (rapper), from Los Angeles, California
- Westside Connection, former hip-hop supergroup from Los Angeles, California
- Warcraft, a multimedia franchise created by Blizzard Entertainment

== Businesses and brands ==
- Dodge WC series, a range of light military trucks produced by Dodge during World War II
- Allis-Chalmers Model WC, a row crop tractor
- Avianca Honduras (IATA code since 1985), an airline based in La Ceiba, Honduras
- Wien Air Alaska (IATA code until 1984), a defunct airline
- Weather Central, a provider of broadcast and interactive web weather solutions
- Wilson Combat, an American firearms manufacturer
- Wisconsin Central (disambiguation), various railroads
- Wheatland County, Alberta, a municipality in south-central Alberta, Canada

== Economics and finance ==
- Workers' compensation, a form of insurance for work-related illness and injury
- Working capital, a financial metric
- Working class
- World-Check, financial institution risk mitigation database

== Science and technology ==
=== Computing ===
- wc (Unix), a Unix utility used for counting words and lines in a file
- Web Components, a set of features that allow for the creation of reusable widgets or components in web documents and web applications
- Write combining, a performance method of combining multiple memory writes

=== Other uses in science and technology ===
- Wall cloud, compounded area of a thunderstorm at the updraft-downdraft interchange where tornadoes may form
- Water cooler, a device that cools and dispenses water
- WC, the chemical formula for tungsten carbide, a metallic compound with a high boiling point
- WC or wc, a short form for inches water column, a unit of measure of pressure often used in HVAC contexts
- Weil–Châtelet group, in mathematics

== Sport ==
- Wild card (sports), a tournament or playoff berth awarded to an individual or team that has not qualified through normal play
- World Championship, a type of global sporting competition
- World Cup, a type of global sporting competition
  - FIFA World Cup, association football tournament

== Other uses ==
- WC postcode area, a group of postcode districts in central London, England
- Wellington College (disambiguation), one of several academic institutions
- Wikimedia Commons, an online collaborative project of the Wikimedia Foundation
- Writing Commons, a peer-reviewed open education textbook for college-level writers
