= WSL =

WSL may refer to:

== Computing ==
- Wide-spectrum language, a kind of programming language
- Windows Subsystem for Linux, a part of Microsoft Windows 10 and 11 which allows the installation of Linux distributions

== Organisations ==
- Swiss Federal Institute for Forest, Snow and Landscape Research (Eidgenössische Forschungsanstalt für Wald, Schnee und Landschaft, WSL)
- White Star Line, a shipping company, owner of the RMS Titanic
- Workers' Socialist League, a UK Trotskyist party

== Sport ==
- Women's Super League, an English professional league for women's association football clubs
- RFL Women's Super League , the top-level women's rugby league league in England
- Women's Super League (basketball), Ireland
- World Series Lights, a motor racing competition
- World Surf League, a global professional competitive surfing league founded in 1976
- Wrestling Superstars Live, a defunct wrestling promotion

== Other uses ==
- Weatherscan Local, the former name of 24-hour weather channel Weatherscan
- Woluwe-Saint-Lambert, a district of Brussels
