= WP =

WP or wp may refer to:

== Organisations ==
- Warsaw Pact, a disbanded organization of Central and Eastern European communist states
- WP Suspension, a manufacturer of motorcycle suspension components, former name White Power Suspension
- Wirtschaftspartei, the Reich Party of the German Middle Class, a political party of Weimar Germany
- Wojsko Polskie, the Polish Armed Forces
- Workers' Party (Singapore), a political party
- Workers Party (United States), a defunct political party
- Workers Party (Ireland), two political parties

== Science and technology ==
- Watt-peak (W_{p}), the nominal power of a photovoltaic
- Wilting point, in soil moisture determination

=== Computing ===
- Weakest precondition (wp), in computer science
- Windows Phone, a smartphone operating system
- WordPerfect, a word processor
- Word processor, software used for the production of printable material
- WordPress (wp.org), a content management system

==== Websites ====
- Wikipedia, an online encyclopedia
- Wirtualna Polska, a Polish web portal
- WordPress.com, a blog hosting provider powered by WordPress

== Transportation ==
- Indian locomotive class WP
- Western Pacific Railroad (reporting mark), a former American railroad
- Island Air (Hawaii) (former IATA code), a former airline
- Air Antwerp (former IATA code), a former Belgian regional airline

== Other uses ==
- WP (Polish TV channel), owned by Wirtualna Polska Holding
- White phosphorus munition, a weapon
- White power, a white supremacist political slogan and ideology
- Widening participation, in higher education
- Wild pitch, in baseball
- Work Programme, a UK welfare to work scheme
- Wettable powder, a formulation of a pesticide
- Western Province (rugby union), a South African professional rugby union team nickname WP
- Western Province Ice Hockey Association (WP Ice Hockey), a non-profit organization

== See also ==
- The Washington Post (WaPo), an American newspaper
