= Whizz Pop Bang =

British science mag for children

- Categories: Children's, science
- Frequency: Monthly
- Publisher: Launchpad Publishing Ltd
- Founder: Jenny Inglis
- Founded: 2015
- Country: United Kingdom
- Based in: Cirencester
- Language: English
- Website: www.whizzpopbang.com

Whizz Pop Bang is a British science magazine for children.

Jenny Inglis founded the magazine in 2015, raising an initial £12,000 ($15002.57 USD) from Kickstarter. Three months later, the magazine had 3,000 subscribers.

A physics graduate, Inglis wanted Whizz Pop Bang to be free of advertising as well as gender-neutral. The scientific content is broad in scope, aimed at children 6–12 years old, and includes puzzles and experiments that can be tried at home or in school. The magazine's writers include Isabel Thomas, author of over 150 science books for children. It lists a group of "Science Advisers", including astronomer Mark Thompson and physicist Jess Wade. The 100th issue was published in 2023, and by then over 1.7 million issues had been sold.

Whizz Pop Bang is a "Key partner" of Birmingham City Council's Birmingham virtual school. As of 2020, the virtual school sends the magazine to schoolchildren in year 5 and 6.

The magazine was shortlisted in The Guardian's "Small Business Showcase Competition" 2015–2016, a finalist in Startups.co.uk's "People’s Champion" 2018, and shortlisted for the Teach Primary Awards in 2019. It won the Parents' Choice Foundation's Silver Award in 2020.
