= WFI =

WFI may mean:

== Organisations ==
- Wikimedia Foundation Inc., American charity who run Wikipedia
- WFI Acquisition Inc, who bought a convenience stores from Tops Markets LLC
- WFI – Ingolstadt School of Management, a German business school
- Women for Independence, Scotland
- Wrestling Federation of India

== Places ==
- Wallis and Futuna, South Pacific (UNDP country code: WFI)
- Westerfield railway station, England (GBR code: WFI)
- Fianarantsoa Airport, Madagascar (IATA code: WFI)

== Other uses ==
- WFIL, American Christian radio station (formerly WFI)
- Water for injection, in medicine
