= WSW =

WSW may refer to:

== Media ==
- Wall Street Week, a business show on the US Public Broadcasting Service (PBS)
- War§ow, a video game
- World Socialist Web Site, a news organization

== Science ==
- West-southwest, a compass direction (one of the eight "half-winds")
- World Space Week, UN-declared space celebration held October 4–10 annually
- WSW, the SAME code for a Winter Storm Warning

== Transport ==
- Wandsworth Common railway station, London, England, National Rail station code

== Organizations ==
- Western Sydney Wanderers FC, an Australian men's association football club
- Western Sydney Wanderers FC (women), an Australian women's association football club
- Wojskowa Służba Wewnętrzna, a former Polish military counterintelligence and military police service
- Wo Shing Wo, a Triad gang
- World Series Wrestling

== Other uses ==
- Women who have sex with women
