= Word of Life =

Word of Life can refer to:

- Word of Life Fellowship, headquartered in Schroon Lake, New York
- Word of Life Christian Church, in New Hartford, New York
- Kale Heywet Word of Life Church, church in Ethiopia
- Livets Ord (Swedish for "Word of Life"), a church founded by Ulf Ekman
- Born Again Movement (From the subtitle of Yalin Xin's book) Large Asian House-Church Network/Fellowship
- Word of Life Bible Church, headquartered in Warri, Nigeria
- Word of Life (mural), mural on the side of the Hesburgh Library at the Notre Dame University
