= World Financial Center =

World Financial Center may refer to:

== China ==
- Chongqing World Financial Center
- Shanghai World Financial Center
- Tianjin World Financial Center

== United States ==
- Brookfield Place (New York City), formerly the World Financial Center complex
  - 200 Liberty Street, formerly One World Financial Center
  - 225 Liberty Street, formerly Two World Financial Center
  - 200 Vesey Street, formerly Three World Financial Center
  - 250 Vesey Street, formerly Four World Financial Center

== See also ==
- World Trade Center (disambiguation)
