= WCL =

WCL may stand for:

== Sports ==
- UEFA Women's Champions League, European women's association football competition
- West Coast League, summer baseball league in the Pacific Northwest
- Western Carolinas League, minor baseball league
- World Chess Live, an internet chess server
- World Combat League, a defunct kickboxing promotion
- World Cricket League, a series of international cricket tournaments for teams without Test status
- World Cup Live, the World Cup show on ESPN and ESPN2

== Other uses ==
- Washington College of Law, American University's law school in Washington, D.C.
- Wellington City Libraries, the Wellington public libraries (New Zealand)
- Western Coalfields Limited, India
- Wide curb lane, also known as a wide outside lane, the outermost lane of a roadway
- World Confederation of Labour, an international confederation of trade unions
- Workers' Communist League of New Zealand, a political party
- Workers Communist League, or Gitlowites, an American political party
