= W/o =

w/o or W/O may refer to:

- Walkover
- Warrant officer
- Write-off

== See also ==
- WO (disambiguation)
