= WNW =

WNW may stand for:

- West-northwest, a compass point
- West Norwood railway station, London, National Rail station code WNW
- Wideband Networking Waveform, a military radio protocol
