= WLB =

WLB may refer to:

== Organisations ==
- Welsh Language Board, a former UK statutory body
- Wiener Lokalbahnen, an Austrian railway company
- Württembergische Landesbibliothek, the Württemberg State Library, in Stuttgart, Germany

== Other uses ==
- Radio K, Minnesota, US, by former callsign
- USCG seagoing buoy tender, by hull classification symbol
- Wiffle League Ball, a wiffle ball league
- Work–life balance, a concept referring to proper prioritizing between career and personal life development
- Weakside linebacker, a defensive position in American and Canadian football
- What Lies Beneath (Tarja album), an album from Finnish singer Tarja
