= WIYN Observatory =

Observatory in Pima County, Arizona

WIYN Telescope
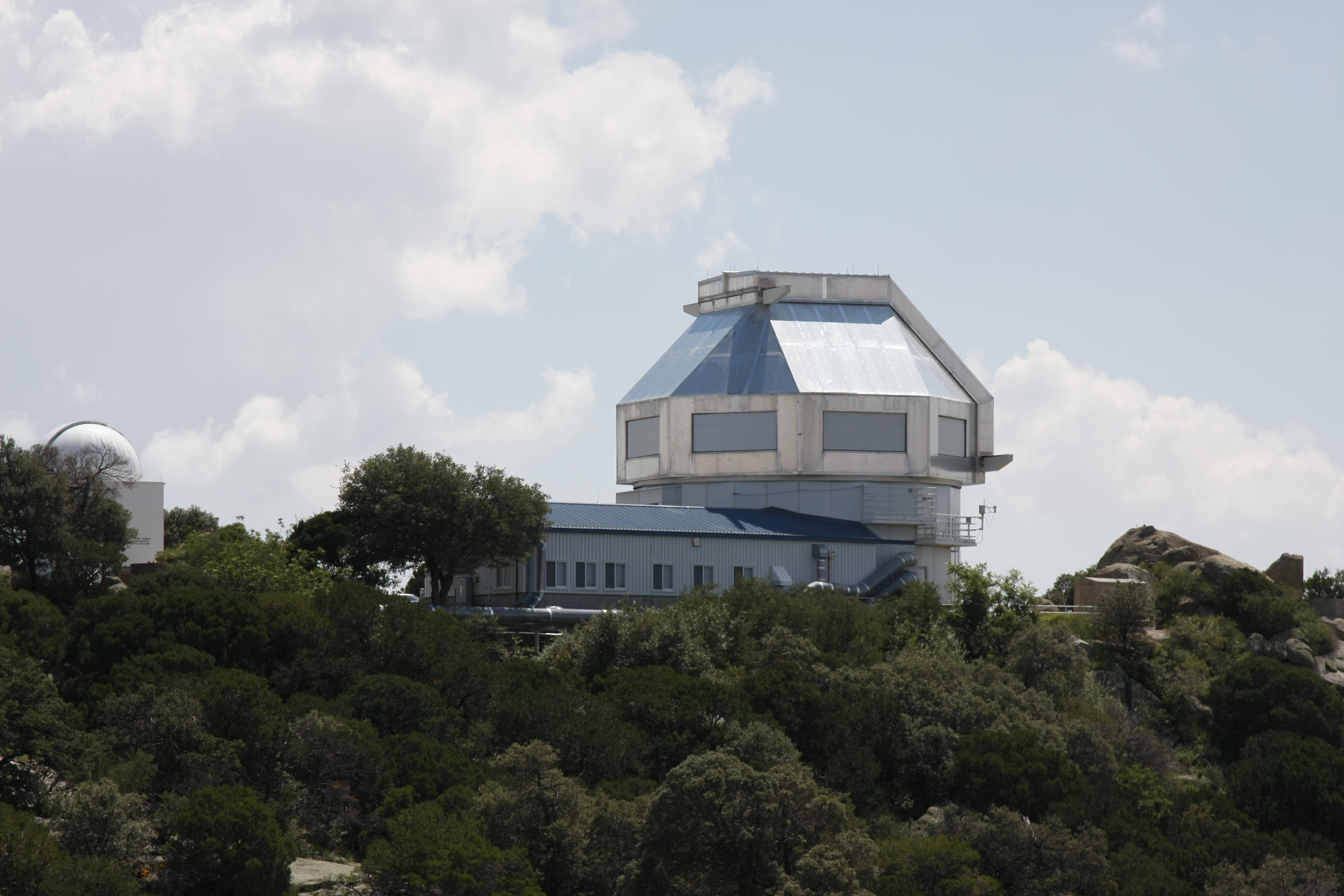
- Location(s): Arizona
- Coordinates: 31°57′27″N 111°36′04″W
- Diameter: 3,498.85 mm (11 ft 5.750 in)
- Collecting area: 9.6 m^{2} (103 sq ft)
- Focal length: 6.125 m (20 ft 1.1 in)
- Website: www.wiyn.org
- Location of WIYN Observatory
- Related media on Commons

The WIYN Observatory is owned and operated by the WIYN Consortium. Its 3.5-meter telescope is the second largest optical telescope at Kitt Peak National Observatory in Arizona. Most of the capital costs for the observatory were provided by the University of Wisconsin–Madison, Indiana University, and Yale University, while the National Optical Astronomy Observatory (NOAO) provides most of the operating services. The NOAO is an institution of the United States; it is the national optical observatory program and supports a collection of ground-based telescopes at Kitt Peak (where WIYN is located) as well as other locations.

== Telescope ==
WIYN is a Ritchey–Chrétien telescope with an altitude-azimuth mount. The lightweight borosilicate primary mirror has a diameter of 3.49885 m (137.75") and was manufactured at the Richard F. Caris Mirror Lab. Sixty-six active optics actuators support the primary mirror.

The telescope is located in a half-Rhombicuboctahedron dome.

== Current instrumentation ==
=== Hydra ===
Hydra is a multiobject spectrograph using fiber optics robotically positioned in the focal plane to allow up to 100 separate objects to be observed at a time. The light is guided to a spectrograph room under the main telescope where a CCD camera records the spectrum of each object. The field of view is approximately 1 degree. Hydra has been operating since 1990. It was originally located at the Nicholas U. Mayall Telescope before being moved to WIYN in 1994. In 2021, Hydra received a major upgrade to the "gripper" fiber positioning robot.

=== NEID ===
Funded by the NN-EXPLORE collaboration between NASA and the National Science Foundation, the NEID spectrograph searches for extra-solar planets by looking for minute variations in the radial velocity of the host star caused by the orbiting planet(s). The extremely precise radial velocities (50 cm/s) provided by NEID will provide masses and densities for exoplanets discovered by the TESS space telescope. The name NEID comes from the Tohono Oʼodham word for "to see."

The spectrograph was designed and built at Pennsylvania State University, with the construction beginning in 2016. The Port Adapter portion of the instrument, which provides guiding, focus correction, fast tip-tilt correction, and atmospheric dispersion correction to the starlight before injecting it into the optical fiber feeding the spectrograph, was built by the University of Wisconsin in collaboration with NOAO. On June 2, 2021, NEID completed commissioning.

The NEID is also assisted by The Texas Advanced Computing Center (TACC) with super-computer time and expertise in the scientific search for new exoplanets.

=== One Degree Imager (ODI) ===
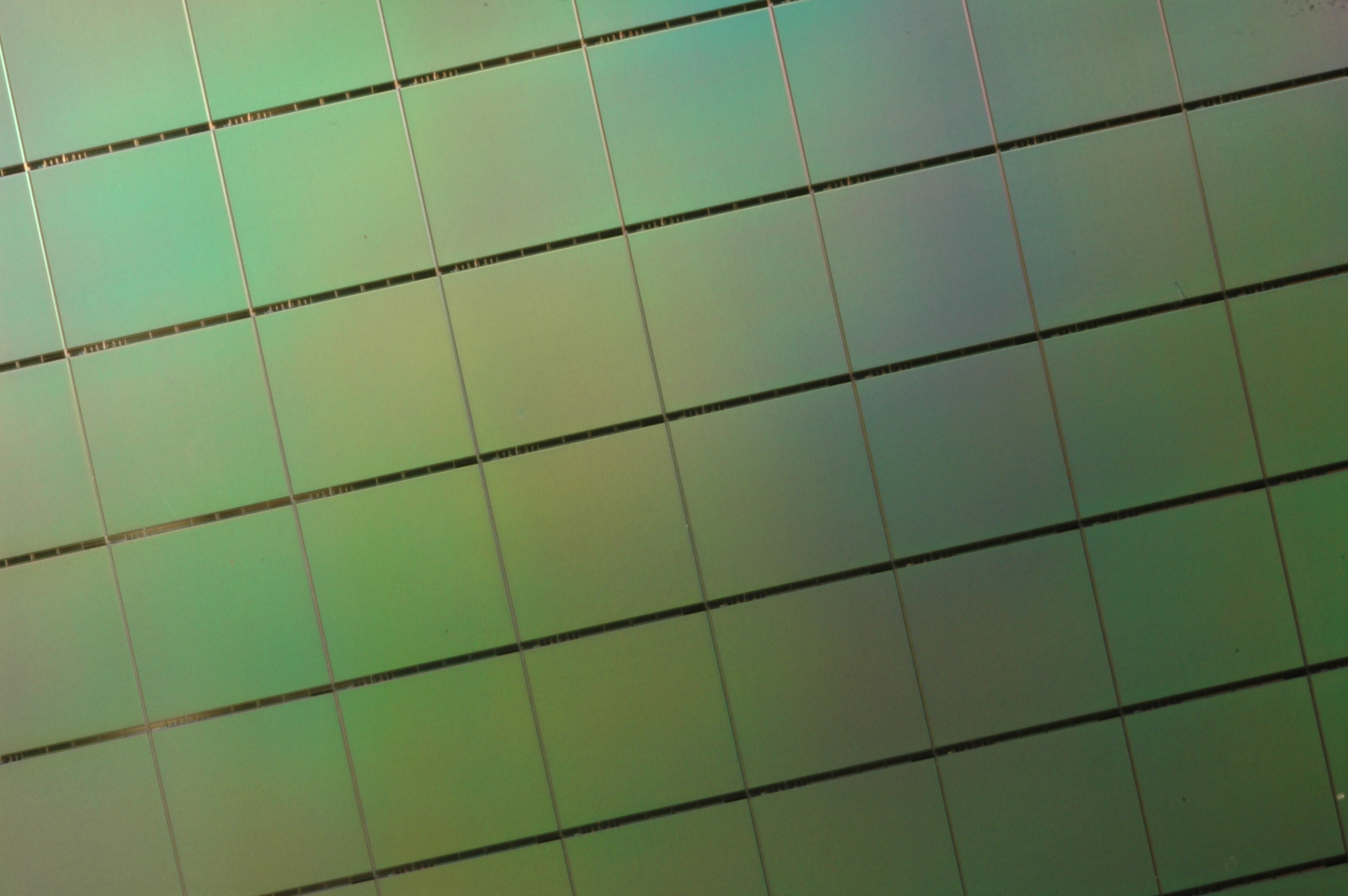
ODI Sensor

The One Degree Imager (ODI) is the flagship of WIYN's new instrument initiatives. ODI utilizes both WIYN's one degree field of view and excellent image quality. The original design for ODI was to cover the one square degree field using a total of 64 Orthogonal Transfer Arrays (OTAs) with a total of 1 GigaPixel and a pixelscale of 0.11 arcseconds per pixel. Orthogonal transfer arrays allow to actively improve image sharpness by correcting images for tip/tilt motion during the integration. Corrections will be done over the entire field of view, making ODI a unique and competitive instrument in the era of wide-field surveys. ODI is funded by the WIYN partners and the National Science Foundation.

ODI was first commissioned in a partial or prototype configuration (pODI) using 13 OTAs in the summer of 2012, and was available for science observations since early 2013. pODI was decommissioned in late 2014 to undergo a significant upgrade. The upgraded ODI, now using 30 OTAs in a 5x6 layout was recommissioned in summer 2015 and has been available for science observations since October 2015.

=== WIYN High Resolution InfraRed Camera (WHIRC) ===
WHIRC is a near infrared high resolution imaging camera commissioned in 2008. WHIRC was a joint project between the WIYN partners and STScI. It consists of a 2k × 2k detector providing an excellent pixel scale of 0.1"/pixel and a field of view of 200 × 200 arcsec. WHIRC can be used with the WIYN Tip/Tilt Module (WTTM) to provide exquisite high-resolution images. A large set of filters is available.

== Past (no longer available) instruments ==
=== Mini-Mosaic ===
MiniMo is a CCD consisting of two 2048 × 4096 pixel chips, with a field of view of 9.6 arcminutes. The two separate chips allow for faster readout of the image than would have been otherwise possible, as they can be read out simultaneously.

== Governance ==
The WIYN Consortium is governed by a board of directors, which includes three members of each partner institution. The board meets twice a year. The Science Steering Committee provides scientific guidance to the board and the WIYN director.

From 2000 to 2008, the WIYN director was George Jacoby, followed by Pierre Martin (2008–2010). From 2010 to 2013, Pat Knezek served as interim director. Since 2013, Eric Hooper (UW-Madison) has served as interim director.

Yale University withdrew from the WIYN consortium on April 1, 2014 and was replaced by the University of Missouri in the fall of that year. In 2015, a NASA-NSF partnership called NN-EXPLORE effectively took over NOAO's share, although NOAO still manages the operations.

== See also ==
- List of astronomical observatories
- List of largest optical reflecting telescopes
- List of the largest optical telescopes in the contiguous United States
