= WVSC =

WVSC may refer to:

- WVSC (FM), a radio station (103.1 FM) licensed to serve Port Royal, South Carolina, United States
- West Virginia State College which became West Virginia State University in 2004
- West Vancouver-Sunshine Coast, a Canadian electoral district
- The Women's Volunteer Service Corps (World War II Canada)
