= WBW =

WBW may refer to:

- Wait But Why, an American blog
- Wilkes-Barre Wyoming Valley Airport, an IATA code for a regional airport in Wilkes-Barre, Pennsylvania
- Womyn-born womyn, women who were assigned female at birth and raised as females
- World Breastfeeding Week, worldwide annual celebration
- WWAY-DT2, formerly WBW, American television station
