= WPE =

WPE may refer to:

- Wall-plug efficiency, a measure of efficiency of LEDs
- Wapping railway station (National Rail station code), a railway station in London, England
- Western Peripheral Expressway, in the National Capital Region, India
- Windows Preinstallation Environment, a replacement for MS-DOS during the installation phase of Windows
- Workers' Party of Ethiopia, a political party in Ethiopia
- WPE, now known as KMBZ (AM), a radio station in Kansas City, Missouri
- Web Platform for Embedded, a WebKit port optimized for embedded devices
