= Wide Field Camera =

Wide Field Camera may refer to these instruments:

- Aboard the Hubble Space Telescope:
  - Wide Field and Planetary Camera (1990–1993)
  - Wide Field and Planetary Camera 2 (1993–2009)
  - Wide Field Camera 3 (installed 2009)
- Wide Field Camera, at the Isaac Newton Telescope in the Canaries
- Wide Field Camera, aboard CALIPSO
