= WSSM =

WSSM may refer to:

- WSSM (FM), a radio station (104.9 FM) licensed to serve Prentiss, Mississippi, United States
- WYXX, a radio station (97.7 FM) licensed to serve Goshen, Indiana, United States, which held the call sign WSSM from 2011 to 2013 and from 2014 to 2016
- WBKZ, a radio station licensed to serve Havelock, North Carolina, United States, known as WSSM from 2005 to 2008
- Winchester Super Short Magnum, cartridge family
