= WSMR =

WSMR may refer to:

- White Sands Missile Range, a military base in New Mexico, United States
- West Shropshire Mineral Railway, a UK railway authorised in 1862 but not built
- West Somerset Mineral Railway, UK railway, with inclined plane, transporting minerals to port. Opened in 1861.
- Wrexham, Shropshire & Marylebone Railway, a former train operating company in the United Kingdom
- Wrexham, Shropshire & Midlands Railway, proposed train operating company in the United Kingdom.
- WSMR (FM), a radio station (89.1 FM) licensed to Sarasota, Florida, United States
