= WPP =

WPP may refer to:

- Labor Party Philippines, also called WPP, a Filipino political party.
- WPP plc, a British multinational advertising and public relations company
- WPP domain, a protein domain found in plants
- Wavefront parallel processing, a video coding technique
- White Patriot Party, a former American white supremacist paramilitary political party
- Windows software trace preprocessor
- United States Federal Witness Protection Program
- Woman's Peace Party, an American pacifist organization established in 1915
- World Press Photo, holder of an annual press photography contest
