= WTS =

WTS is an acronym for:

== Arts and media ==
- World Tour Soccer a console video game
- WT Social, a social media platform founded 2019
- Web Transport System (WTS), a transport social network

== Military ==
- War Training Service, 1942–1944, United States
- William Tecumseh Sherman, 1820–1891, American Civil War general
- Women's Transport Service, founded 1937, United Kingdom
- Bundeswehr Museum of German Defense Technology (German: Wehrtechnische Studiensammlung Koblenz), founded 1877

== Non-profit organisations ==
- The Watchtower Society (aka Watch Tower Bible and Tract Society of Pennsylvania), the primary corporation for administration of Jehovah's Witnesses' activities worldwide
- Westminster Theological Seminary, a Christian graduate institution
- Women's Transportation Seminar, a women's organization for transportation professionals; see 100 years of women in transport campaign

== Places ==
- Wall Township Speedway, a racing track in New Jersey
- Wong Tai Sin, Hong Kong, China
  - Wong Tai Sin station, by MTR station code

== Other uses ==
- WTS Group, an international consulting group with tax, legal and consulting business units
- ITU World Triathlon Series, the International Triathlon Union's annual series of triathlon events
- Want to show, a frequently used phrase in mathematics
- Wind turbine syndrome, pseudoscientific medical conspiracy theory

== See also ==
- WT (disambiguation)
