= WEA =

Wea may refer to:

- Wea, a former Native American tribe in Indiana, United States
- Wea, Kansas, United States
- We`a, a town in Djibouti

WEA may refer to:

== Places ==
- W.E.A., residential area in Karol Bagh, Delhi, India
- West End Avenue in Manhattan, New York

== Transport ==
- Parker County Airport near Weatherford, Texas, United States; IATA airport code and FAA location identifier
- West Ealing railway station in Ealing, London (National Rail station code WEA)

== Organizations ==
- Wanganui East Athletic, a New Zealand association football club
- Warner Records, formerly with imprint WEA
- Washington Education Association
- WEA (an initialism for Warner–Elektra–Atlantic), a name used 1972–2001 for the record company subsequently known as Warner Music and renamed in 2001 to Warner Music Group
- Werner Erhard and Associates, a company offering training in self-transformation
- White Eagle Aviation, a Polish airline
- Workers' Educational Association, an organization involved in adult education in the UK, Australia and New Zealand
- World Evangelical Alliance, a network of evangelical organizations

== Technology ==
- Wireless Emergency Alerts, an alerting network designed to disseminate emergency alerts
