= WDC =

WDC may refer to:

== Organizations ==
- Western Defense Command, a U.S. Army formation during World War II
- Western Design Center, a U.S. microprocessor company
- Western Digital Corporation (NASDAQ: WDC), an American disk drive manufacturer
- Whale and Dolphin Conservation, an international organisation
- World Dance Council
- World Darts Council, later Professional Darts Corporation
- The Walt Disney Company

== Other uses ==
- World Data Center, for 1957–1958 International Geophysical Year data system
- World Design Capital, a design award
