= WOF =

WOF may refer to:

- Warn-on-Forecast, a research program led by the National Severe Storms Laboratory
- Warrant of Fitness, a compulsory yearly or six-monthly test of motor vehicles in New Zealand
- Wheel of Fortune (American game show), a long-running American game show
- Wings of Fire (novel series), by Tui T. Sutherland
- Winter Olympic Federations, an inter-sport federation organisation
- Worcester Foregate Street railway station, Worcestershire, England (National Rail station code)
- Worlds of Fun, an amusement park in Kansas City, Missouri
- WOF (album), by Quiero Club
