= WVR =

WVR may refer to:

== Railways ==
- The Willamette Valley Railway in Oregon, USA
- The Wye Valley Railway in Gloucestershire and Monmouthshire, UK

== Information technology ==
- IBM Websphere Voice Response, an enterprise IVR platform

== Other uses ==
- The Women's Emergency Corps, which became the Women's Volunteer Reserve
- Water Vapor Regain (%WVR), the mass of water (%WbV) reabsorbed by a material after being re-exposed to 50% RH at 23°C for 24 hours
- Weighted voting rights (WVR) structure, public companies' share structure, which enables certain share holders (typically called A-share) to have greater voting power in general meetings.
- Within visual range (WVR), opposite of beyond visual range (BVR), a concept in air-to-air combat
