= WSC (radio station) =

- Siasconset, Massachusetts; United States

WSC was the call sign of Radio Corporation of America's (RCA) marine coast radio station located at first at Siasconset, Nantucket Island, Massachusetts, United States, and later in Tuckerton, New Jersey, and last in West Creek, New Jersey.

== Station history ==
At first the station was owned and operated by the British Marconi Company, later by Marconi Wireless Telegraph Company of America, and still later by Radio Corporation of America.
