= WM =

WM, Wm, wm, or variants may refer to:

== Businesses and organizations ==
- Walmart, an American retailing chain
- Walter Mart, a group of shopping malls in the Philippines
- WarnerMedia, formerly Time Warner, an American mass media conglomerate
- Washington Mutual, a former American savings bank (former NYSE stock symbol WM)
- Waste Management (corporation), a North American garbage company (former NYSE stock symbol WM), doing business as WM
- Western Maryland Railway, a former railway in the United States
- Winair (Windward Islands Airways) (IATA airline code WM)
- WM Entertainment, a South Korean entertainment company

== Military ==
- Waterloo Medal, a medal awarded to British soldiers who fought in the Waterloo campaign in 1815
- Wachtmeister, a military rank in Austria and Switzerland
- "Wehrmacht Marine", on license plates of the German Navy in World War II
- Woman Marine, a female member of the United States Marine Corps

== Science and technology ==
=== Computing ===
- Window manager, software that controls the placement of windows on the screen
  - X window manager, a component in the X Window System
- Window Maker, a window manager for the X Window System
- Windows Media, a multimedia framework for media creation and distribution for Microsoft Windows
- Windows Messenger, a piece of software included in the Microsoft Windows XP operating system
- Windows Mobile, an operating system for Pocket PCs

=== Other uses in science and technology ===
- Waldenström's macroglobulinemia, a rare form of blood cancer
- Wave method, a model used in fluid dynamics
- White matter, a type of brain tissue
- Working memory, a part of the short-term memory

== Sport ==
- Die Weltmeisterschaft – German for the FIFA World Cup, informally referred to as die WM
- WM formation, a formation in association football, so called because it spells out the letters when viewed from above
- WrestleMania, a professional wrestling pay-per-view event

== Other uses ==
- Wayback Machine
- William (name), sometimes abbreviated Wm.
- College of William & Mary, a public research university in Virginia, US
- Worshipful Master, the head of a lodge in freemasonry
- William McKinley, 25th president of the United States
