= WBE =

WBE may refer to:

- IBM Websphere Business Events
- Waritai language
- Wastewater-based epidemiology
- WENY-DT3, a television station
- Whole brain emulation
- West, Brown, and Enquist metabolic scaling theory
- Woman owned business enterprise
