= WOSM =

WOSM may refer to:

- World Organization of the Scout Movement, a non-governmental international organization
- WOSM (FM), a radio station (103.1 FM) in Ocean Springs, Mississippi, United States
- Worldwide Oil Spill Model, a simulation program for oil spills; see Oil spill#Estimating the volume of a spill
