= WBA =

WBA may refer to:

- Walgreens Boots Alliance, an American drug retail company
- Warner Bros. Animation, produces animated films
- West Bromwich Albion F.C., an English football club
- Western Band Association, a circuit for high school marching bands in California
- Williams Boag architects
- Wireless Broadband Alliance, an industry association promoting interoperability between operators in the Wi-Fi industry
- Women's Billiards Association, founded in 1931
- World Branding Awards, an industry awards for brands
- World Basketball Association, a basketball league in the southeastern United States
- World Boxing Association, an international organization of professional boxing
- Why–because analysis, a method of accident analysis
- WWBA, a radio station in Tampa Bay, Florida
- World Bodypainting Association, an association for body painters
- Finnish Commuter Airlines (ICAO code)
