= WMD =

WMD, or wmd, may refer to:

== Science and technology ==
- Weapon of mass destruction
- Weighted mean in statistics
- Wiggle-match-dating or wiggle matching in carbon dating
- World Meteorological Day

== Transportation ==
- WMD, the National Rail code for Wymondham railway station in Norfolk, UK
- WMD, the station code for Westmead railway station in Sydney, Australia

== Other uses ==
- Wagner-Murray-Dingell Bill, failed US healthcare reform bill
- West Midlands (county), metropolitan county in England, Chapman code
- wmd, the ISO 639-3 code for the Mamaindê language spoken in the Mato Grosso state of Brazil
- World Malaria Day
- W.M.D., a 2017 film
- Water Management Districts, such as the water management districts in Florida
