= Wez =

Wez or WEZ may refer to:

- Wez-Velvain, a village in the province of Hainaut, Belgium
- Wez, a former French commune, now part of Val-de-Vesle, Marne département
- Wez, a character in the film Mad Max 2
