= Windsor F.C. =

Windsor F.C. may refer to:

- Windsor F.C. (2011), currently active English football club
- Windsor F.C. (1882), English football club active from 1882 to 1890
- Windsor F.C. (Glasgow), Scottish football club active from 1876 to 1881
- Windsor FC (Australia), Australian football club active from 1915 to 1934

== See also ==
- Windsor & Eton F.C. (1892), an English football club from 1892 to 2011
- Windsor & Eton F.C. (2023), an English football club formed in 2023
- Windsor City FC, a Canadian soccer club
