= VW (disambiguation) =

VW is Volkswagen, a German automobile manufacturer.

VW, V.W., Vw, or Vw. may also refer to:

== Science and technology ==
- Van Wijngaarden grammar (vW-grammar), in computer science
- Viewport width, in Web design, a Cascading Style Sheets unit of length
- Vowpal Wabbit, online machine-learning software

== Other uses ==
- "VW", a song on Fantasy Black Channel by Late of the Pier
- Aeromar (former IATA code: VW), a former Mexican airline

== See also ==
- VW Cephei, a binary star system
- VW Hamme, a Belgian association football club
- VW Herald, a cycling race held in South Africa
