= World Medicine Institute =

- Type: Unaccredited for-profit
- Active: 1970; 56 years ago – 2018; 8 years ago
- President: Chang Yi Hsiang, LAc, DAc
- Dean: Gayle Todoki, LAc, DAc
- Location: Honolulu, Hawaii, United States
- Nickname: WMI
- Website: worldmedicineinstitute.com

The World Medicine Institute (WMI) was a private, for-profit university in Honolulu, Hawaii. It offered a master's degree in acupuncture and oriental medicine, which are regarded as pseudoscience by the mainstream medical and scientific communities. WMI's programs were approved by the Hawaii State Board of Acupuncture.

== History ==
WMI was founded by Chang Yi Hsiang. It originally opened as The School of the Six Chinese Arts in 1970 and was formally registered with the State in 1972. In 1974, some of the school's founders helped establish the Hawaii State Acupuncture Board. At the time, Hawaii was the second state to legally recognize and license acupuncturists. Chang Yi Hsiang served from 1974 to 1978 as a Commissioner on the first Hawaii State Board of Acupuncture. The college was named Tai Hsuan Foundation College of Acupuncture & Herbal Medicine until 2005.

In 1985, the school applied for candidacy to the Accreditation Commission for Acupuncture and Oriental Medicine (ACAOM) and in 1991 was granted full accreditation. ACAOM accreditation for WMI and its program of study was terminated effective April 30, 2018.
