= WZ =

WZ may refer to:

- WZ sex-determination system, also known as the ZW sex-determination system
- WZ theory, a technique for simplifying certain combinatorial summations in mathematics
- Eswatini (FIPS 10-4 country code WZ)
- Westdeutsche Zeitung, a German newspaper
- Wetzlar, Germany
- WinZip, a computer file compression software
- Wizet, a Korean online gaming developer, which uses the file extension .wZ
- W and Z bosons in particle physics
