= Elitar Sigma =

Sigma
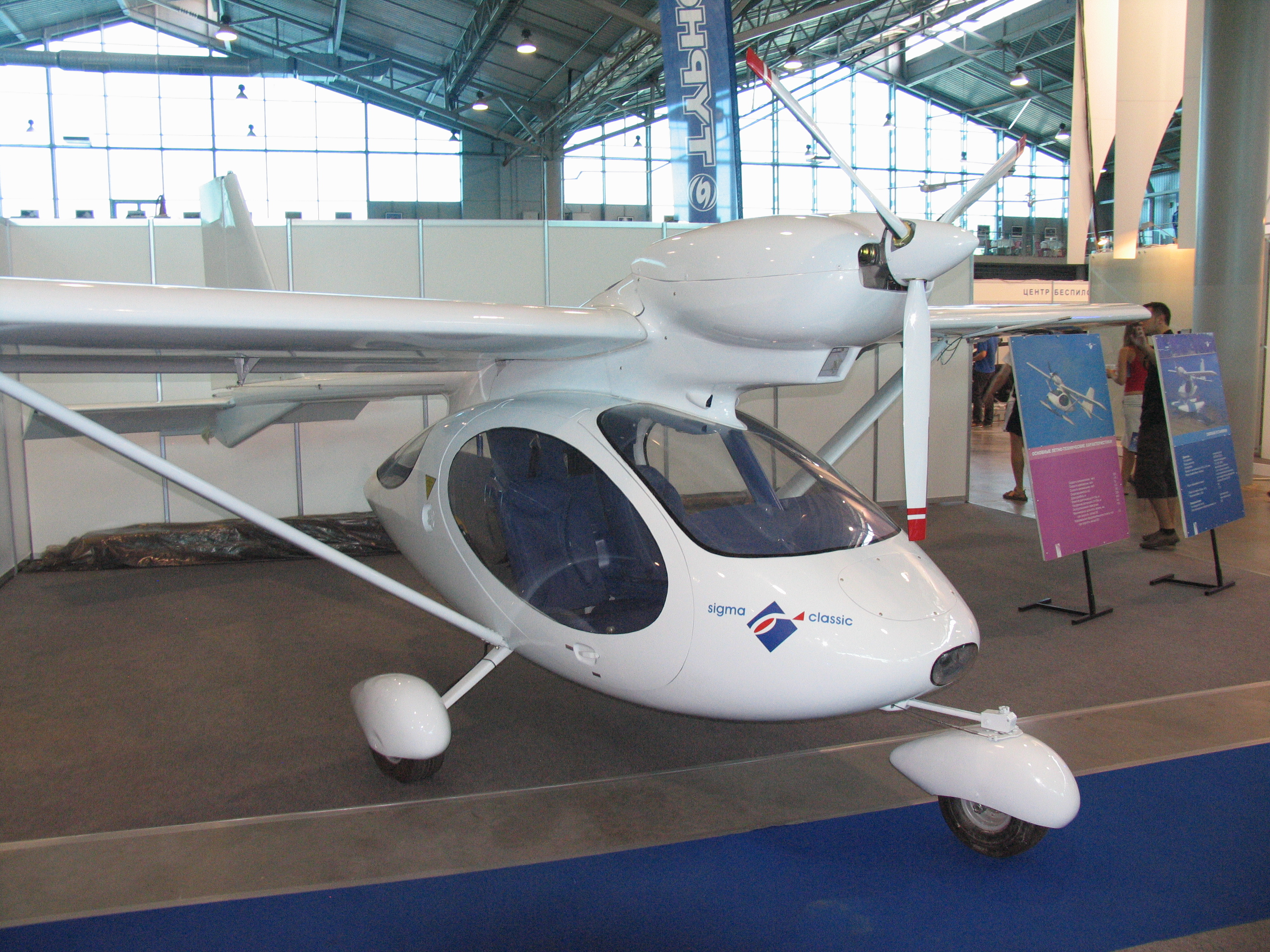

General information
- Type: Light-sport aircraft
- National origin: Russia
- Manufacturer: Elitar (Samara VVV-Avia)
- Status: In production 2010
- Number built: 20

History
- First flight: 2002

The Elitar Sigma or Elitar (Samara VVV-Avia) Sigma is a single engine light aircraft of wing and boom layout, seating two in side-by-side configuration. It was designed and built in Russia where production continued until at least 2010.

== Design and development ==
Design of the Sigma, then known as the Sigma-4, began in 1991 at the Sigma design bureau though it was later associated with the Albatros bureau. First flown in 2002, from 2003 it was marketed by Elitar, a bureau formed in 1997. Manufacture of the eighth and later aircraft has been at the Samara based VVV-Avia factory.

The Sigma is a metal framed aircraft with largely composite skin, though with metal on the fin and fabric covering on the ailerons, which have GRP noses. The flaps are also GRP structures. The wing has constant chord, 1.5° of dihedral and a full span combination of flaps and ailerons. The exposed boom aft of the wing trailing edge is slender and carries the rectangular horizontal tail surfaces, large triangular fin and parallel chord rudder, plus a small ventral fin. A Rotax 912 ULS flat four engine is mounted above the wing position and forward of its leading edge.

The teardrop shaped pod is mounted below the wing and braced to it, with a single faired lift strut on each side from its lower part. Access to the side-by-side seating is by large glazed doors. There is a luggage area behind the seats and a rear transparency. The tricycle undercarriage is short, placing the Sigma close to the ground. All wheels are on cantilever spring legs and enclosed by fairings. The nosewheel leg is horizontal and the wheel casters. The Sigma can also be configured as a floatplane, the floats attached with a complex of struts. A MVEN K-600-00 ballistic recovery parachute is standard on Russian aircraft.

== Operational history ==
Twelve or more Sigmas had been built by 2010. One, with a civil registration, flies at a Russian experimental station, another with an aero club in Ukraine. Four kits have been delivered to New Zealand, three in 2005 and one in 2009.

The type achieved LSA compliance in the United States under the name Samara VVV-Avia Elitar-Sigma C4E. There have been two Sigmas on the US civil register, one of them a sales demonstrator which was deregistered and returned to the manufacturers after the sales campaign was abandoned in 2006.

== Specifications ==
Data from Jane's All the World's Aircraft 2011/12

General characteristics

- Capacity: 2
- Length: 6.19 m (20 ft 4 in)
- Wingspan: 9.80 m (32 ft 2 in)
- Height: 2.91 m (9 ft 7 in)
- Wing area: 10.90 m^{2} (117.3 sq ft) gross
- Empty weight: 384 kg (847 lb) equipped
- Max takeoff weight: 540 kg (1,190 lb) normal, LSA 598 kg (1,320 lb)
- Fuel capacity: 65 L (17.2 US gal, 14.3 Imp gal
- Powerplant: 1 × Rotax 912 ULS air- and water-cooled flat four, geared down by 2.43:1, 75.3 kW (101.0 hp)
- Propellers: 3-bladed, 1.72 m (5 ft 8 in) diameter

Performance

- Maximum speed: 200 km/h (120 mph, 110 kn)
- Cruise speed: 130 km/h (81 mph, 70 kn) economical, normal cruise 170 km/h (110 mph; 92 kn)
- Stall speed: 76 km/h (47 mph, 41 kn) flaps down
- Never exceed speed: 240 km/h (150 mph, 130 kn)
- Range: 650 km (400 mi, 350 nmi)
- Endurance: 5 hr 30 min
- Rate of climb: 6.0 m/s (1,180 ft/min) maximum, at sea level
