= WST =

WST may refer to:

- Web Science Trust, a UK Charitable Trust
- Western Standard Time, a proper name for one of Australia's time zones observed in Western Australia (UTC +8)
- West Samoa Time, the standard West Samoa Time Zone
- Samoan tala, the ISO 4217 code for the currency of Samoa
- Water Soluble Tetrazolium, in relation to Tetrazolium salts
- World System Teletext
- Weapons System Trainer, US military term for a flight simulator optimised for weapons training
- Wholesale sales tax, a form of sales tax
- Willamette Shore Trolley, a heritage streetcar service in Oregon, United States
- Water Science and Technology, a scientific journal on the management of water quality.
- Westerly State Airport IATA code
- Wood Street railway station, London, National Rail station code
- World Snooker Tour, the main professional snooker tournament arrangement
- World-systems theory, a multidisciplinary approach to world history and social change
