= WY =

Wy or WY may refer to:

== Places ==
- Principality of Wy, an Australian micronation
- Wyoming, US (postal abbreviation)

== Other uses ==
- WY Records, a record label
- Oman Air, the national airline of Oman
- WebYeshiva, a website for religious study
- Wisin & Yandel, a Puerto Rican reggaeton duo
- Weyerhaeuser (NYSE symbol WY), real estate investment trust company
