= WIYN Consortium =

University astronomy partnership

WIYN Consortium founding members were the University of Wisconsin–Madison (W), Indiana University (I), Yale University (Y), and the National Optical Astronomy Observatories (N). Yale University withdrew from the WIYN consortium on April 1, 2014, and was replaced by the University of Missouri in the fall of that year. In 2015, a NASA-NSF partnership called NN-EXPLORE effectively took over NOAO's share, although NOAO still manages the operations. Purdue University joined in 2017 for a three-year period.

The consortium operates two telescopes of 3.5 m and 0.9 m diameters.

The universities financed the construction of the WIYN Observatory at Kitt Peak National Observatory (KPNO) in 1994.

In 2001, the WIYN Consortium took over control of the KPNO 36-inch (910 mm) telescope, built in 1960, and rechristened it as the WIYN 0.9 m Telescope. This small but popular telescope was in danger of being mothballed for budgetary reasons.
