= WR =

WR may refer to:

== Arts and media ==
- W.R.: Mysteries of the Organism, a 1971 Serbian film
- League of Legends: Wild Rift, a 2020 mobile game by Riot Games
- War Robots, a 2014 mobile game by Pixonic
- Wikipedia Review, an Internet forum
- Wiltshire Radio, an English radio station (1982–2019; later Heart Wiltshire)

== Language ==
- ⟨wr⟩, a digraph in English

== People ==
- William Rex (royal cypher: WR):
  - William IV (1765–1837), of the United Kingdom and Hanover
  - William III of England (1650–1702)
- Willie Revillame (born 1961), Filipino television host

== Science, technology and mathematics ==
- Band 3, a protein (HGNC code: WR)
- Wasserman reaction, an antibody test for syphilis
- Water Resistant mark, stamped on wrist watches
- Wolf-Rayet star, in astronomy
- Wolf-Rayet galaxy, in astronomy
- Wreath product, in group theory
- Weather radio, a specialized receiver built for receiving weather information

== Sport ==
- Welter Racing, a French racecar design team
- Wide receiver, a position in gridiron football
- Williams Racing, British Formula One motor racing team and constructor
- World record, the best result ever
- World Rugby, the governing body for rugby union
- Work rate, in association football

== Transport and post ==
- WR postcode area, West Midlands, England
- WR Draw, a railbridge in New Jersey, US
- Western Railway zone, India
- WestJet Encore, an airline in Alberta, Canada (IATA:WR)
- Wardha Junction railway station (station code: WR), Maharashtra, India
