= Risk Management Exchange =

German futures exchange

The Risk Management Exchange (RMX) was a futures exchange based in Hannover, Germany which filed for insolvency in February 2009.

It was founded as the Warenterminbörse Hannover (Commodity Exchange Hannover, WTB) in 1998 by the German Farmers' Union and a group of financiers. It was Germany's first fully electronic commodity exchange.

In December 2005 WTB and Dekrebo Kredit Börse merged and the new group was renamed RMX.

As of January 2007, current agricultural commodities traded are

- Hogs
- Piglets
- Potatoes (three kinds; 'Table', 'European Processing' and 'London')
- Wheat

The contract on brewing barley is suspended as of 30 April 2008. Recyclable paper contracts are currently suspended (as of 2005). Rapeseed was traded in the past.
