= World Trade Center =

World Trade Center or World Trade Centre may refer to:

== Buildings ==
=== New York City ===
- World Trade Center (1973–2001), a building complex that was destroyed during the September 11 attacks in 2001
  - World Trade Center site, also known as "Ground Zero"
- World Trade Center (2001–present), a building complex built on the site of the above
  - One World Trade Center, the signature building of the rebuilt complex

=== Other places ===
- List of World Trade Centers
- CentralWorld; a shopping plaza and complex in Siam area, Bangkok, Thailand; known as World Trade Center until 2002

== Transit stations ==
- World Trade Center station (IND Eighth Avenue Line), a New York City Subway terminal station, serving the E train
- World Trade Center station (MBTA), a Massachusetts Bay Transportation Authority station in Boston
- World Trade Center station (PATH), a Port Authority Trans-Hudson station in New York City
- WTC Cortlandt station (also known as "World Trade Center"), a New York City Subway station, serving the 1 train
- Taipei 101–World Trade Center metro station, a metro station in Taipei, Taiwan
- World Trade Centre (Dubai Metro), a Dubai Metro station

== Other uses ==
- World Trade Center (film), a 2006 film

== See also ==
- World Trade Centers Association, an organization founded by the Port Authority of New York and New Jersey
- World Financial Center (disambiguation)
- World Trade (disambiguation)
- Category:World Trade Centers
