= Dorset Biological Warfare Experiments =

Series of biological warfare experiments

The Dorset Biological Warfare Experiments were a series of experiments conducted between 1953 and 1975 by the Ministry of Defence to determine the extent to which a single ship or aircraft could dispense biological warfare agents over the United Kingdom. The tests were conducted by government scientists from Porton Down, initially using zinc cadmium sulfide (ZnCdS) as a simulated agent. Early results showed that one aircraft flying along the coast while spraying its agent could contaminate a target over 100 miles (160 km) away, over an area of 10,000 square miles (26,000 km^{2}). This method of biological warfare–and the test method used to study it–were known as Large Area Coverage (LAC).

In the early 1960s, Porton Down was asked to expand the scope of their tests to determine if using a live bacterium instead of ZnCdS would significantly alter the results. Scientists from the Microbiological Research Establishment at Porton Down selected South Dorset as the site for this next phase of testing, with Bacillus subtilis (also known as Bacillus globigii, or BG) selected as the test agent. This bacterium was sprayed across South Dorset without the knowledge or consent of the inhabitants.

== Background ==
Government research into biological warfare tactics first began in the 1910s with the advent of the First World War. The UK and US governments began conducting open-air research experiments during the Second World War.

== DICE trials ==
The DICE trials took place between 1971 and 1975. Serratia marcescens, along with an anthrax simulant and phenol, were sprayed over Dorset.

At the time, S. marescens was thought to be harmless, but it has since been deemed a human pathogen.

== Independent review ==
After pressure from people in south Dorset and their members of parliament, the Ministry of Defence circa 1999 commissioned an independent review of the possible health effects of the trials by Professor Brian G. Spratt of the Wellcome Trust Centre for the Epidemiology of Infectious Disease, University of Oxford. Spratt concluded that the vast majority of those exposed to the bacteria were "very unlikely to have had health consequences" but there may have been some threat to health from the E. coli trial for a small number of people who had serious underlying disease and were particularly susceptible to infection. It was impossible to estimate the size of this threat.

== See also ==
- Anthrax weaponization
- Biological Weapons Convention
- Dugway Proving Ground
- European Centre for Disease Prevention and Control
- Health in the United Kingdom
- Operation Cauldron
- Operation Dew
- Operation Sea-Spray
- Project SHAD
- Science and technology in the United Kingdom
- Soviet biological weapons program
- Suffield Experimental Station
- Unethical human experimentation
- World Health Organization
