= Rafferty =

Rafferty, derived from Ó Raifeartaigh, is an Irish surname, and may refer to:

== People ==
- Anne Rafferty (born 1950), English jurist
- Anne Marie Rafferty (born 1958), British nurse and academic
- Barbara Rafferty (born 1950), Scottish actress
- Bill Rafferty (1944–2012), American comedian
- Billy Rafferty (born 1950), Scottish footballer
- Charles Rafferty (poet), American poet
- Charles D. Rafferty (1879–1949), American football player and coach
- Chips Rafferty (1909–1971), Australian actor
- Claire Rafferty (footballer) (born 1989), English pundit and retired footballer
- Claire Rafferty (actress) (born 1982), Northern Irish actress
- Damien Rafferty (fl. 2010s), Irish Gaelic footballer
- Frances Rafferty (1922–2004), American actress and dancer
- Gerry Rafferty (1947–2011), Scottish singer, songwriter, musician and record producer, a founding member of the band Stealers Wheel
- Jack Rafferty (born 1995), English boxer
- John Rafferty (disambiguation)
- Joel Rafferty (Hong Kong Educator)
- Kevin Rafferty (1948–2020), American filmmaker
- Larry Rafferty, American entrepreneur
- Marta "Mary" Rafferty, subject of controversial medical brain experiments by Roberts Bartholow (1831–1904)
- Martin Rafferty, American activist and philanthropist
- Max Rafferty (1917–1982), American educator and politician
- Neil Rafferty, 21st century American politician
- Ronan Rafferty (born 1964), Northern Irish golfer
- Sara Greenberger Rafferty (born 1978), American artist
- Sarah Rafferty (born 1972), American television and film actress
- Tom Rafferty (1954–2025), American football player

== Fictional characters ==
- "Gunny" Rafferty, lead character of Rafferty and the Gold Dust Twins, a 1975 American film, played by Alan Arkin
- Jack Rafferty, in the Sin City comic book series
- Michael Rafferty, main character in the TV series Rafferty's Rules
- Sid Rafferty, protagonist of Rafferty, a 1977 television series starring Patrick McGoohan

== See also ==
- Rafferty Peak
- Senator Rafferty (disambiguation)
- Raftery
- Raffertie
