= Operation Sea-Spray =

Secret biological warfare test by the US military

Operation Sea-Spray was a 1950 U.S. Navy secret biological warfare experiment in which Serratia marcescens and Bacillus globigii bacteria were sprayed over the San Francisco Bay Area in California in order to determine how vulnerable a city like San Francisco would be to a bioweapon attack. There has been speculation that the experiment may have contributed to one death and at least ten illnesses.

== Military test ==
Starting on September 20, 1950, and continuing until September 27, the U.S. Navy released the two types of bacteria from a ship offshore of San Francisco. Based on results from monitoring equipment at 43 locations throughout the city, the Army determined that San Francisco had received enough of a dose for nearly all of the city's 800,000 residents to inhale at least 5,000 of the particles. This is within the range of infectivity for anthrax.

== Illnesses ==
On October 11, 1950, eleven residents checked into Stanford Hospital near San Francisco with very rare, serious urinary tract infections. Although ten recovered, Edward J. Nevin, who had recent prostate surgery, died three weeks later from a heart valve infection. The urinary tract outbreak was so unusual that the Stanford doctors wrote it up for a medical journal. None of the other hospitals in the city reported similar spikes in cases, and all 11 victims had urinary-tract infections following medical procedures, suggesting that the source of their infections was inside the hospital. Cases of pneumonia in San Francisco also increased after Serratia marcescens was released, though a causal relation has not been conclusively established. The bacterium was also combined with phenol and an anthrax simulant and sprayed across south Dorset by US and UK military scientists as part of the DICE trials that ran from 1971 to 1975.

There was no evidence that the Army had alerted health authorities before it blanketed the region with bacteria. Doctors later wondered whether the experiment might be responsible for heart valve infections around the same time as well as serious infections seen among intravenous drug users in the 1960s and 1970s.

== Senate subcommittee hearings ==
In 1977, the U.S. Senate Subcommittee on Health and Scientific Research held a series of hearings at which the U.S. Army disclosed the existence of the tests. Army officials noted the pneumonia outbreak in their testimony but said any link to their experiments was totally coincidental. The Army pointed out that no other hospitals reported similar outbreaks and all 11 victims had urinary-tract infections following medical procedures, suggesting that the source of their infections lay inside the hospital.

== Lawsuit ==
In 1981, Nevin's surviving family members filed suit against the federal government, alleging negligence and responsibility for the death of Edward J. Nevin, as well as financial and emotional harm caused to Nevin's wife from the medical costs.

The lower court ruled against them primarily because the bacteria used in the test was unproven to be responsible for Nevin's death. The Nevin family appealed the suit all the way to the U.S. Supreme Court, which declined to overturn lower court judgments.

== Similar biological warfare tests ==
In the Senate subcommittee hearings in 1977, the US Army revealed:

- Between 1949 and 1969, open-air tests of biological agents were conducted 239 times. In 80 of those experiments, the Army said it used live bacteria that its researchers at the time thought were harmless. In the others, it used inert chemicals to simulate bacteria.
- In the 1950s, army researchers dispersed Serratia on Panama City and Key West Florida with no known illnesses resulting.
- In the 1950s, army researchers dispersed zinc cadmium sulfide, a known cancer-causing agent, over Minnesota and other Midwestern states to see how far they would spread in the atmosphere. The particles were detected more than 1,000 miles (1,600 km) away in New York state.
- Bacillus globigii, never shown to be harmful to people, was released in San Francisco, New York, Washington, D.C., and along the Pennsylvania Turnpike, among other places.
- In New York, military researchers in 1966 spread Bacillus subtilis variant Niger, also believed to be harmless, in the subway system by dropping lightbulbs filled with the bacteria onto tracks in stations in midtown Manhattan. The bacteria were carried for miles throughout the subway system. Army officials concluded in a January 1968 report that: "Similar covert attacks with a pathogenic disease-causing agent during peak traffic periods could be expected to expose large numbers of people to infection and subsequent illness or death."
- In a May 1965 secret release of Bacillus globigii at Washington's National Airport and its Greyhound Lines bus terminal, more than 130 passengers were exposed to the bacteria and traveled to 39 cities in seven states in the two weeks following the mock attack.

== See also ==
- Unethical human experimentation in the United States
- 1951 Pont-Saint-Esprit mass poisoning
- Operation Northwoods
