= Charles Rafferty =

Charles Rafferty may refer to:

- Charles Rafferty (poet), American poet
- Charles D. Rafferty (1879–1949), American football player and coach
