= Operation LAC =

Chemical Corps operation which dispersed zinc cadmium sulfide particles over the U.S.

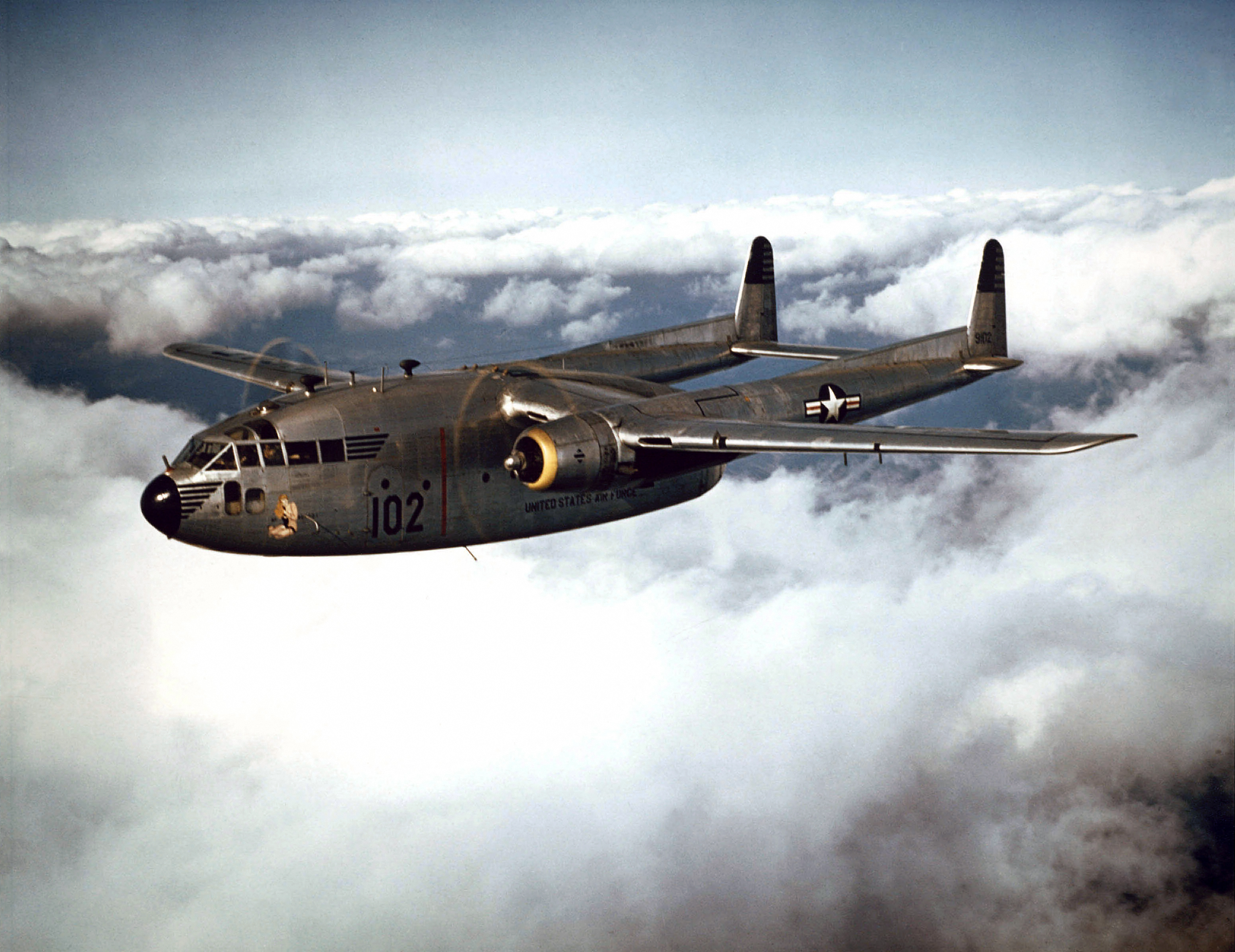
A C-119 Flying Boxcar, the type of plane used to release the chemicals

Operation LAC (Large Area Coverage) was a United States Army Chemical Corps operation which dispersed microscopic zinc cadmium sulfide (ZnCdS) particles over much of the United States and Canada in order to test dispersal patterns and the geographic range of chemical or biological weapons.

== Earlier tests ==
There were several tests that occurred prior to the first spraying affiliated with Operation LAC that proved the concept of large-area coverage. Canadian files relating to participation in the tests cite in particular three previous series of tests leading up to those conducted in Operation LAC.

- September 1950 – Six simulated attacks were conducted upon the San Francisco Bay Area. It was concluded that it was feasible to attack a seaport city with biological aerosol agents from a ship offshore.
- March–April 1952 – Five trials were conducted off the coast of South Carolina and Georgia under Operation Dew. It was concluded that long-range aerosol clouds could obtain hundreds of miles of travel and large-area coverage when disseminated from ground level under certain meteorological conditions.
- 1957 – North Sea, East coast of Britain. It was shown that large-area coverage with particles was feasible under most meteorological conditions.

In addition, the army admitted to spraying in Minnesota locations from 1953 into the mid-1960s.

In St. Louis in the mid 1950s, and again a decade later, the army sprayed zinc cadmium sulfide via motorized blowers atop Pruitt-Igoe, at schools, from the backs of station wagons, and via planes.

== Operation ==
Operation LAC was undertaken in 1957 and 1958 by the U.S. Army Chemical Corps. The operation involved spraying large areas with zinc cadmium sulfide. The U.S. Air Force loaned the Army a C-119, "Flying Boxcar", and it was used to disperse the materials by the ton in the atmosphere over the United States. The first test occurred on December 2, 1957, along a path from South Dakota to International Falls, Minnesota.

The tests were designed to determine the dispersion and geographic range of biological or chemical agents. Stations on the ground tracked the fluorescent zinc cadmium sulfide particles. During the first test and subsequently, much of the material dispersed ended up being carried by winds into Canada. However, as was the case in the first test, particles were detected up to 1,200 miles away from their drop point. A typical flight line covering 400 miles would release 5,000 pounds of zinc cadmium sulfide and in fiscal year 1958 around 100 hours were spent in flight for LAC. That flight time included four runs of various lengths, one of which was 1,400 miles.

== Specific tests ==
The December 2, 1957, test was incomplete due to a mass of cold air coming south from Canada. It carried the particles from their drop point and then took a turn northeast, taking most of the particles into Canada with it. Military operators considered the test a partial success because some of the particles were detected 1,200 miles away, at a station in New York state. A February 1958 test at Dugway Proving Ground ended similarly. Another Canadian air mass swept through and carried the particles into the Gulf of Mexico. Two other tests, one along a path from Toledo, Ohio, to Abilene, Texas, and another from Detroit, to Springfield, Illinois, to Goodland, Kansas, showed that agents dispersed through this aerial method could achieve widespread coverage when particles were detected on both sides of the flight paths.

== Scope ==
According to Leonard A. Cole, an Army Chemical Corps document titled "Summary of Major Events and Problems" described the scope of Operation LAC. Cole stated that the document outlined that the tests were the largest ever undertaken by the Chemical Corps and that the test area stretched from the Rocky Mountains to the Atlantic Ocean, and from Canada to the Gulf of Mexico. Other sources describe the scope of LAC varyingly; examples include, "Midwestern United States", and "the states east of the Rockies". Specific locations are mentioned as well. Some of those include: a path from South Dakota to Minneapolis, Minnesota, Dugway Proving Ground, Corpus Christi, Texas, north-central Texas, and the San Francisco Bay area.

== Risks and issues ==
Bacillus globigii was used to simulate biological warfare agents (such as anthrax), because it was then considered a contaminant with little health consequence to humans; however, BG is now considered a human pathogen.

Anecdotal evidence exists of ZnCdS causing adverse health effects as a result of LAC. However, a U.S. government study, done by the U.S. National Research Council, stated, in part, "After an exhaustive, independent review requested by Congress, we have found no evidence that exposure to zinc cadmium sulfide at these levels could cause people to become sick." Still, the use of ZnCdS remains controversial and one critic accused the Army of "literally using the country as an experimental laboratory". According to the National Library of Medicine's TOXNET database, the EPA reported that Cadmium-sulfide was classified as a probable human carcinogen.

== See also ==
- Human experimentation in the United States
- Operation Dew
- Project 112
