= Rafferty (disambiguation) =

Rafferty is a surname. It may also refer to:

- Rafferty (TV series), a 1977 series starring Patrick McGoohan
- Rafferty (film), a 1980 Russian television film
- Rafferty Peak, Yosemite National Park, California, United States
- Rafferty Stadium, a lacrosse stadium on the campus of Fairfield University in Fairfield, Connecticut, United States
