= USS Tercel =

Minesweeper of the United States Navy

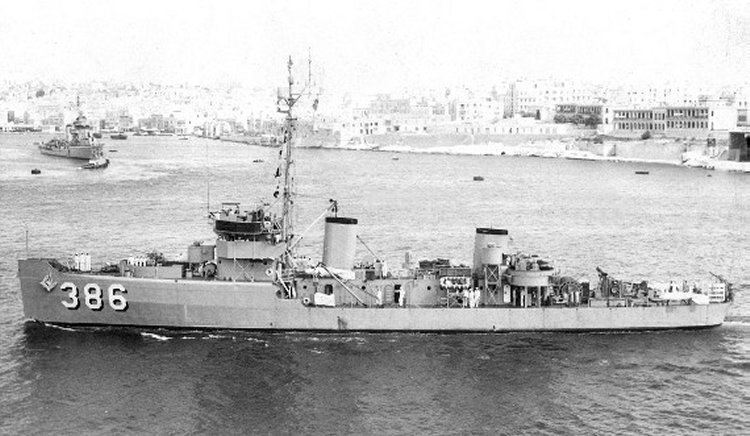

History

United States
- Name: USS Tercel
- Laid down: 16 May 1944
- Launched: 16 December 1944
- Commissioned: 21 August 1945
- Decommissioned: 10 November 1954
- Reclassified: MSF-386, 7 February 1955
- Stricken: 1 July 1972
- Fate: Disposed of in support of Fleet training exercise; 6 April 1988

General characteristics
- Class & type: Auk-class minesweeper
- Displacement: 890 long tons (904 t)
- Length: 221 ft 3 in (67.44 m)
- Beam: 32 ft (9.8 m)
- Draft: 10 ft 9 in (3.28 m)
- Speed: 18 knots (33 km/h; 21 mph)
- Complement: 100 officers and enlisted
- Armament: 1 × 3-inch/50-caliber gun; 2 × 40 mm guns; 2 × 20 mm guns; 2 × Depth charge tracks

USS Tercel (AM-386) was an Auk-class minesweeper acquired by the United States Navy for the dangerous task of removing mines from minefields laid in the water to prevent ships from passing.

Tercel was named after the "tercel", the male of various hawks, especially of the peregrine falcon and the goshawk.

Tercel was laid down on 16 May 1944 by the American Ship Building Company, Lorain, Ohio; launched on 16 December 1944; sponsored by Mrs. J. H. Thompson; and commissioned on 21 August 1945.

== East Coast operations ==
Following trials in Lake Erie, Tercel headed for the Atlantic via the Great Lakes waterway and the St. Lawrence River. She arrived at Boston on 7 September and was outfitted. Sailing on 2 November, Tercel reached Little Creek, Virginia, the next day for her shakedown cruise.

Tercel was assigned to Mine Forces, Atlantic Fleet, on 1 January 1946, when that organization was activated. She stood out of Norfolk, Virginia, a week later and conducted exercises in the Chesapeake Bay until 21 March. In April, she was assigned to the Mine Warfare School at Yorktown, Virginia, and supported that establishment until 2 July 1946. The minesweeper conducted local operations and participated in exercises along the eastern seaboard from the Caribbean to New London, Connecticut.

== Assignment to the Mediterranean ==
On 20 July 1951 when she arrived at Charleston, South Carolina. Tercel stood out of Charleston in early September 1951 for her first deployment to the Mediterranean. While there, she called at Gibraltar and ports in Italy, France, Malta, and Greece. Upon her return to Charleston on 6 February 1952, she resumed her normal U.S. East Coast routine.

== Operation Dew I ==
Operation Dew I was a Chemical, Biological, Radio-logical (CBR) warfare experiment. Dew I consisted of five separate trials from 26 March 1952 until 21 April 1952 that were designed to test the feasibility of maintaining a large aerosol cloud released offshore until it drifted over land, achieving a large area coverage (LAC).

The tests released zinc cadmium sulfide along a 100-to-150-nautical-mile (190 to 280 km) line approximately 5 to 10 nautical miles (10 to 20 km) off the coast of Georgia, North Carolina and South Carolina. Two of the trials dispersed clouds of zinc cadmium sulfide over large areas of all three U.S. states. The tests affected over 60,000 square miles (150,000 km^{2}) of populated coastal region in the U.S. southeast. The Dew I releases were from a Navy minesweeper, the USS Tercel.

== Second Mediterranean assignment ==
Tercel was again deployed to the Mediterranean from 21 April to 26 October 1953. Then, after approximately eight months of operations in home waters, the minesweeper was transferred to the Atlantic Reserve Fleet for a preinactivation overhaul.

== Decommissioning ==
The ship was placed out of commission, in reserve, at Orange, Texas, on 10 November 1954. On 7 February 1955, she was redesignated MSF-386 and reclassified a steel-hulled fleet minesweeper. Tercel was struck from the Navy Directory on 1 July 1972.

== Fate ==
The Naval Vessel Register lists Tercel as "Disposed of, type of disposal not known" and has a note saying: "Presumed scrapped date unknown", this is incorrect, she was not scrapped. Tercel was used as a Salvage Training Hulk from 1972 to 1988. She was sunk as a target on 6 April 1988, being towed to the target area by the USS Grapple (ARS-53).
