= John Rafferty =

John Rafferty may refer to:

- John Rafferty Jr. (born 1953), Pennsylvania politician
- John Rafferty (Canadian politician) (born 1953), Ontario politician
- John Rafferty (footballer)
- John Chandler Rafferty (1816–1880), American politician from New Jersey
- John K. Rafferty (born 1938), American politician in New Jersey
- John Rafferty (boxer) (born 1951), Scottish boxer

== See also ==
- Jack Rafferty (born 1995), English boxer
