= Senator Rafferty =

Senator Rafferty may refer to:

- John Chandler Rafferty (1816–1880), New York State Senate
- John Rafferty Jr. (born 1953), Pennsylvania State Senate
