= Green Run =

1949 classified radioactive release at the Hanford Site

- Part of Cold War arms race and radioactive releases from the Hanford Site
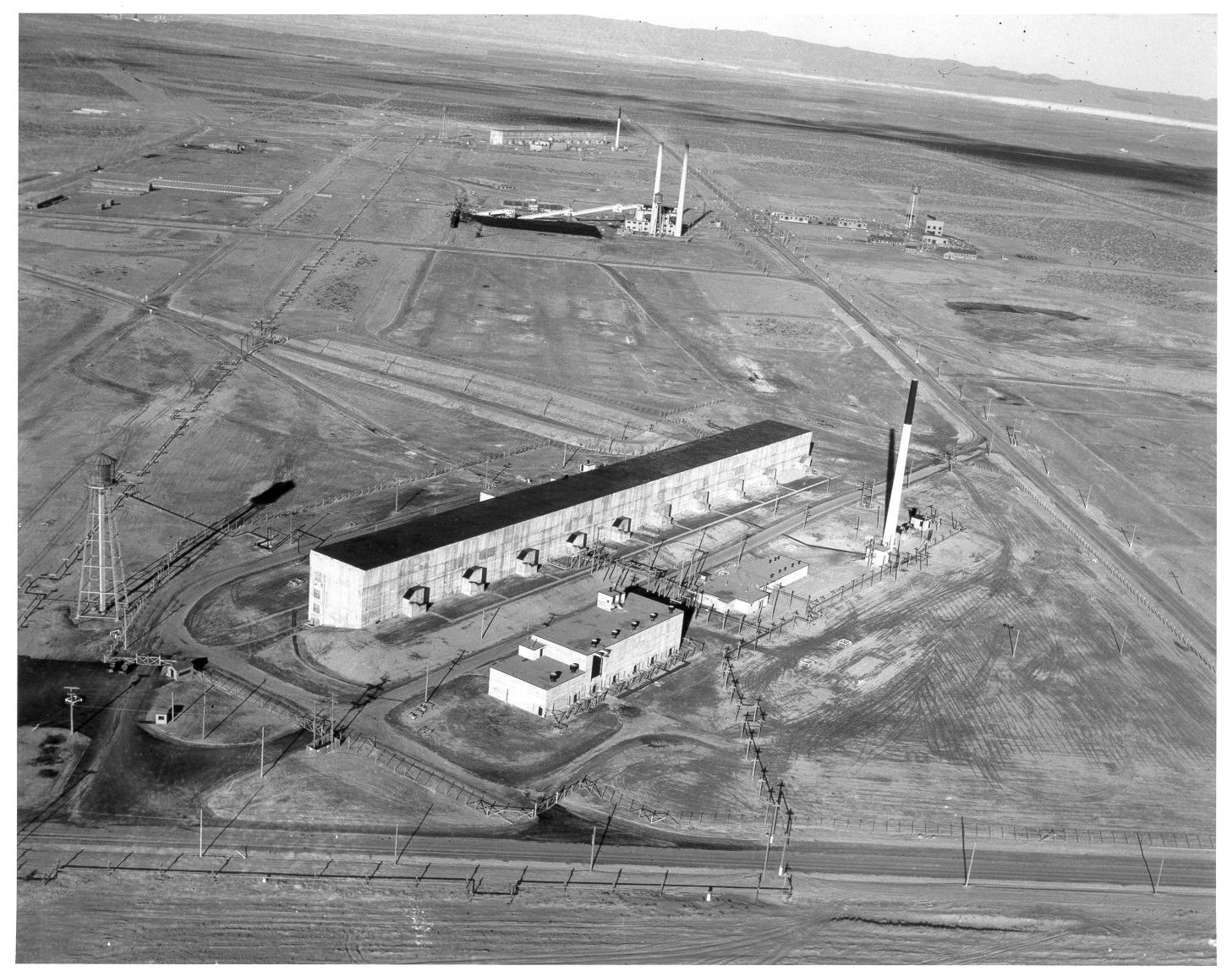
- T Plant, from which the Green Run release was vented

- Location within Washington (state) Location within the United States
- Date: December 2–3, 1949
- Time: release began evening of December 2 (PST)
- Duration: 12 to 17 hours
- Venue: T Plant chemical separation facility, 200 West Area
- Location: Hanford Site, Benton County, Washington, United States; 46°33′23″N 119°38′40″W
- Also known as: Green Run experiment; Green Run release
- Type: Classified intentional release of radioactive fission products
- Cause: Processing of irradiated uranium fuel after a 16-day decay period, with off-gas scrubbers not operated
- Motive: Test of aerial and ground monitoring methods for detecting radioactive material from nuclear production
- Target: Detection and tracking of radioactive production off-gases
- Participants: United States Atomic Energy Commission; United States Air Force; General Electric Hanford operating contractor
- Outcome: Release of radioactive iodine and xenon into the atmosphere over parts of Washington and Oregon

The Green Run was a classified, intentional release of radioactive fission products conducted on December 2 and 3, 1949, at the Hanford Site plutonium production complex in Eastern Washington. The experiment was conducted by the United States Atomic Energy Commission and the United States Air Force, with General Electric as Hanford's operating contractor. For the test, irradiated uranium fuel from Hanford's F Reactor was processed after a 16-day decay period rather than the longer cooling period normally used, and off-gas scrubbers were not operated during the release from the T Plant chemical separation facility.

The test took place during heightened U.S. concern about Soviet nuclear capabilities after the first Soviet nuclear test. According to the GAO, a premise of the Green Run was that aerial monitoring and sampling of a radioactive cloud, even at long distances from its source, could provide evidence of nuclear materials. Reported release estimates vary: GAO reported about 7,800 curies of radioactive iodine and 20,000 curies of xenon, while Robkin's later reanalysis estimated about 11,000 curies of iodine-131 and 29,000 curies of xenon-133.

Weather conditions during the test limited the intended atmospheric diffusion, and radioactive iodine was later found on vegetation over large areas of southeast Washington and Oregon. The release exceeded Hanford's then-existing vegetation deposition tolerance in the Yakima, The Dalles, Spokane, and Blue Mountains areas. The Department of Energy later categorized the Green Run as one of the fourteen most significant safety-related incidents in Hanford's history. The experiment remained undisclosed for decades, until declassified references and Freedom of Information Act requests brought it to public attention; the Advisory Committee on Human Radiation Experiments later concluded that the Green Run did not conform to the public-safety practices in effect at Hanford in 1949.

== Background ==
The Green Run took place at the Hanford nuclear site in Washington, where plutonium production involved irradiating uranium fuel and chemically separating plutonium-239. The name referred to the use of green irradiated uranium fuel, processed after a much shorter cooling period than normal. Because irradiation also produced radioactive fission products, including iodine-131 and xenon-133, normal batch processing took place 83 to 101 days after reactor extraction, allowing radioactive isotopes to decay before the plutonium-239 was extracted more safely.

For the Green Run, the batch was fresh from the reactor and had only a scheduled 16-day decay period before it was processed and vented into the atmosphere. The irradiated fuel for the Green Run was supplied by the "F" reactor. As a result, the unfiltered exhaust from the production facility was much more radioactive than exhaust from a normal batch.

The Green Run occurred shortly after the first Soviet nuclear test, during heightened U.S. concern about Soviet nuclear capabilities. The Green Run was reportedly designed to test United States Air Force nuclear weapons monitoring systems intended for use against the Soviet Union and their evolving nuclear weapons program. Before the experiment, Hanford staff detected evidence of the first Soviet nuclear detonation using air samples collected on Rattlesnake Ridge. In a 1995 Department of Energy oral history, a member of the Hanford team recalled that, to his knowledge, theirs was the only successful sampling of the test's fallout in the United States and that the Air Force subsequently confiscated their samples and data. The test results from the Soviet nuclear samples were entirely confiscated by the Air Force the same night they were confirmed.

According to a test participant cited by the GAO, the Green Run was premised on the idea that aerial monitoring and sampling of a radioactive cloud, even at long distances, could reveal evidence of nuclear materials. The Green Run was also related to United States government fears of radiological warfare and dirty bombs; part of its purpose was to study how an unexpected release of radioactive gases over a populated area could be detected. ORNL-341, a secret Oak Ridge National Laboratory document that examined the proposed Green Run in April 1949, had recommended releasing even higher doses of radiation into Washington state.

== Planning ==
Unknown United States Atomic Energy Commission officials authorized the Green Run on October 25, 1949. Jack Healy, a chemical engineer at Hanford who worked on the Green Run, was interviewed in 1995 by staff from the DOE, Battelle Memorial Institute, Los Alamos National Laboratory, and the Pacific Northwest National Laboratory. Healy and Lieutenant W.E. Harlan prepared the plans for the Green Run locally at Hanford in 1949. Healy reported that he and other science staff at the time were unaware of the full risks of environmental radioactivity and the "milk-to-man pathway", and that he believed the staff would have objected to the Green Run. He said the milk contamination theory was only proven ten years later due to the United Kingdom's Windscale nuclear accident.

The Air Force conducted multiple aerial surveys of the region in the weeks before the Green Run began. A dedicated air sampling station was set up in Spokane before the test began. The Air Force managed its own radiation monitoring operations separately from the DOE during the Green Run. General Electric's Health Instrument Division had laid out specific conditions required for the test to succeed. The Air Force was responsible for all meteorological data and determinations related to the Green Run. The final test conditions required a cold layer of air near ground level, with an inversion that would deflect gases away from soil contamination; no precipitation; wind speed at an altitude of 200 feet (61 m) below 15 miles per hour (24 km/h); wind from the west or southwest; and all of those conditions remaining in place until the experiment ended.

By December 2, particularly bad weather in the Palouse had already caused the government's preferred Green Run testing schedule to fall increasingly behind. The next recommended release window was designated for December 3 at 1:00 a.m. because favorable weather was predicted then. However, the Green Run began releasing radioactive gas early, at 8:00 p.m. on December 2. The weather was reportedly fine at the initiation of the test, near 8 p.m., but by 2 p.m., the wind had fully calmed and then began blowing more southward along the Columbia River. Michele Gerber, the Hanford Site Historian, explained that the military had been waiting for the opportunity to begin the Green Run.

The problem was that the late fall in the Columbia Basin is always full of fog and inversions. It's very characteristic here, and that didn't mesh well with the plans of the Department of Defense to run a test here at that time. And the Department of Defense was here for two or three weeks waiting for a clear day. They didn't get a clear day.
—Michele Gerber

== Release ==
The radioactive release experiment was ordered to begin uncontrolled dispersal on a day with adverse wet and windy weather conditions, despite testing requirements, causing concentrated radioactive material to fall as rain and snow over Spokane and Walla Walla on December 2 and 3. At the time the test began, weather conditions were reported to be unpredictable, rapidly changing, and incompatible with the experiment's stated requirements. It also rained and snowed. For the Green Run, filters at the T Plant chemical separation facility were intentionally bypassed and off-gas scrubbers were not operated, allowing a larger release of radioactive material into the atmosphere.

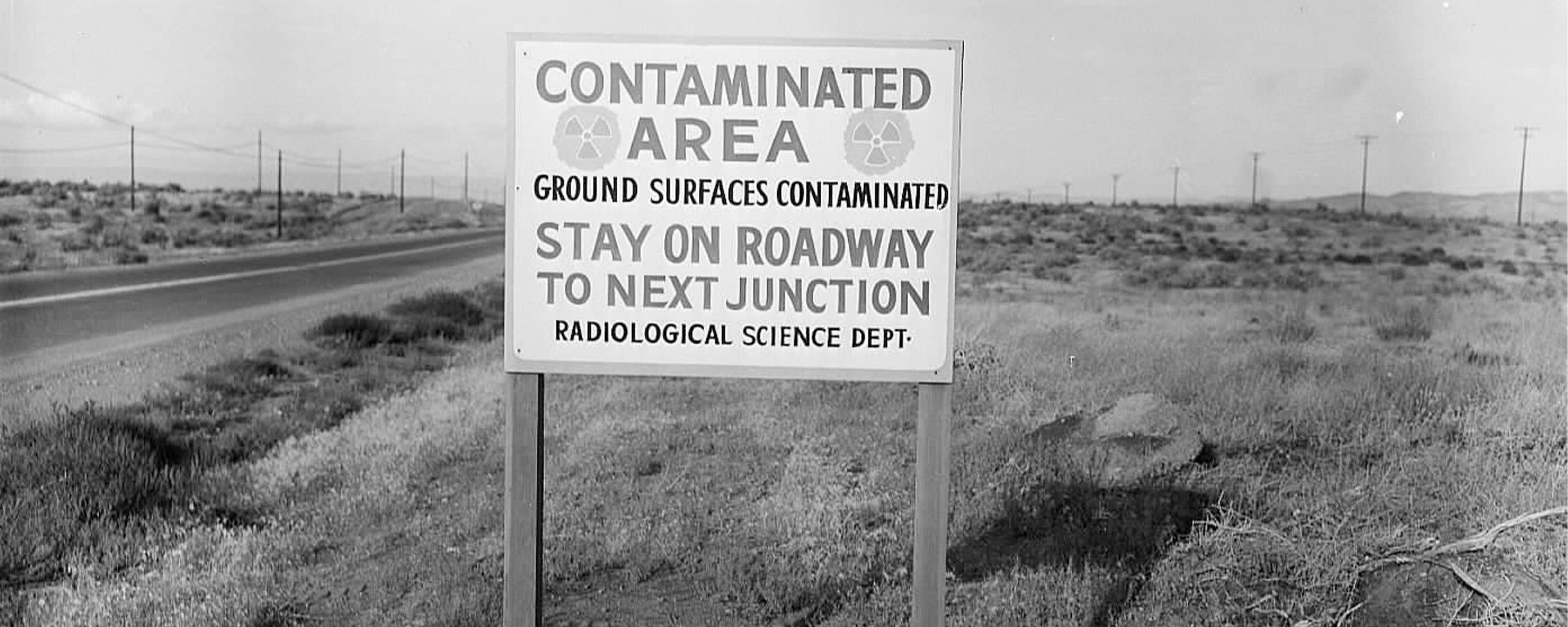
A sign at Hanford warning of contamination.

Douglas C-47 Skytrain airplanes were involved in monitoring the Green Run. By sunrise on December 3, Air Force pilots observing the test conditions had begun reporting problems, as prior Air Force meteorological predictions were upended by sudden and unexpected increases and shifts in wind speed, along with the unplanned appearance of a temperature inversion. Testing equipment necessary for the Green Run was known to be contaminated by radiation before the test, causing high background signals; the already bad weather conditions during the release worsened this by concentrating radioactive materials at the release stacks. Other portions of the test included a lost weather balloon and failing air pumps.

The complete discharge of iodine-131 and xenon-133 from the beginning of the Green Run took a total of 12 to 17 hours. Sources cite 5,500 to 12,000 curies (200 to 440 TBq) of iodine-131 released, along with an even greater amount of xenon-133. Robkin's 1992 reanalysis calculated 0.40 PBq ± 30% (11,000 Ci ± 30%) of iodine-131, somewhat larger than the earlier estimates of 0.15-0.30 PBq (4,000-7,780 Ci) from Singlevich (1950) and Jenne and Healy (1950). Robkin also estimated that approximately 29,000 Ci (1.07 PBq) of xenon-133 was released. Goliszek gave the Green Run release as almost 8,000 curies of iodine-131 and 20,000 curies of xenon-133 in 2003. For unknown reasons, double the initially expected amount of iodine-131 and nearly triple the expected amount of xenon-133 were released in an initial wind-swept plume that was 200 mi (320 km) long and 40 mi (64 km) wide. The Green Run was the single largest one-day release of radioiodine from Hanford during its peak years of operation at the height of World War II.

Officials involved in the test said the release was not considered unsafe at the time, and GAO noted that no regulatory limits then existed for the amount of such emissions, despite the release being highly concentrated over a 12-hour period. GAO reported conflicting recollections among AEC contractor officials about who approved the weather conditions for the test, with one account placing the decision with AEC contractor officials and another stating that the AEC did not want to proceed but the Air Force ordered the test. The U.S. government in 1949 designated the Green Run as top secret for national security reasons, but declined to classify it as human experimentation because the test was "not undertaken with the intent of testing the effects of radiation in humans or designed to measure human exposure."

== Spread ==
The Green Run radioactive plume then "stagnated" in the local air and weather conditions for "several days" before a new storm sent it toward the north and northeast, further worsening the spread of radioactive materials. Green Run radioactive contamination spread from Richland north 214 mi (344 km) to Kettle Falls, Washington, and south 374 mi (602 km) to Klamath Falls, Oregon, as well as to Kennewick, 27 mi (43 km) to the southeast and against the wind at the time of the release. The 1949 Green Run nuclear contamination spread over towns and cities. After the Green Run, thyroid radiation levels eighty times the daily safe limits were detected in animal sampling on the Hanford site grounds, while radiation sampling along the full plume pathway detected levels four hundred times above safe limits. The release exceeded Hanford's then-existing vegetation deposition tolerance in the Yakima, The Dalles, Spokane, and Blue Mountains areas.

The radiation released from the Green Run exceeded the amount released in 1979 during the Three Mile Island accident by roughly seven hundred times. Three Mile Island was a widely disclosed 1979 event with voluntary evacuations; no evacuation or disclosure orders were issued for the Green Run. The Department of Energy later categorized the Green Run as one of the 14 most significant safety-related incidents in Hanford's history.

== Later releases ==
Officials reported that they had suspended further planned intentional releases until 1962, when the government secretly restarted radiation release experiments over populated areas at Hanford. In 1962, Hanford again secretly released iodine-131 into the environment for one year as part of studies of atmospheric, soil, vegetation, and animal contamination. The 1962 active release of radioactive gases lasted an entire year and was also kept secret. From 1944 to 1972, Hanford released 739,000 curies of iodine-131 into surrounding communities. Although also kept secret, the 1962 radiation release tests were related to ongoing government biomedical studies of nuclear fallout and the properties and behavior of iodine-131 after environmental release, as the Green Run had been. During the 1962 releases, human volunteers were directed by the U.S. government to inhale iodine-131 so researchers could study its effects on their thyroids, and Hanford workers were recruited to drink iodine-131-irradiated milk from contaminated dairy cattle. Between 1963 and 1968, controlled releases of iodine-131 were also conducted at the National Reactor Testing Station in Idaho to study environmental contamination and human exposure.

== Disclosure ==
The Green Run remained a government secret until 1986, when declassified AEC documents and Freedom of Information Act requests by Karen Dorn Steele of The Spokesman-Review and the Hanford Education Action League in Spokane helped bring the experiment to public attention. A May 1950 Atomic Energy Commission report on the Green Run test remained classified in full, leaving it undisclosed for almost four decades. FOIA requests and appeals led to the test report being largely declassified in 1989.

Portions of reports detailing aspects of the Green Run written in the 1950s were among the releases, with notably variable views of the experiments and the amounts of released contaminants at the time. In 1986, the Centers for Disease Control and Prevention established the Hanford Health Effects Review Panel, which recommended studies to reconstruct radiation doses received by area residents and investigate the feasibility of studying health effects from iodine-131 exposure. The subsequent Hanford Environmental Dose Reconstruction Project (HEDRP) was conducted by Pacific Northwest Laboratories in the wake of the revelations from the Hanford panel. As of May 2000, the State of Washington reported that, despite later disclosures, the United States government still withheld critical Green Run-related information, including the names of those responsible for ordering and carrying out the release of radioactive materials into public communities for scientific testing.

The Advisory Committee on Human Radiation Experiments (ACHRE) in a 1995 report stated that the Green Run "clearly did not conform to the practices designed to ensure public safety at Hanford in 1949 or even during the rush to produce plutonium for the first atomic bombs." The United States in the ACHRE report maintained that "there may be conditions under which national security can justify secrecy in intentional releases like the Green Run, even as we recognize that secrecy can increase the risk to the exposed population." In a 1995 oral history, health physicist Carl C. Gamertsfelder, Ph.D., described his recollection of the Green Run's purpose, attributing it to the Air Force's interest in tracking Soviet radioactive releases.

Herb Parker called me to request that I, and the groups that I supervised, cooperate with the Air Force in the conduct of an experiment which became known as the Green Run ... And we didn't recommend, we wouldn't have recommended, that they operate it. We told them that. They wanted to run anyway, and they did run.
—Carl C. Gamertsfelder

== Litigation ==
People affected by the Green Run were among those known as Downwinders, and the Green Run with other releases caused anger and public distrust of the Hanford facility and government handling of its affairs from the public. Lawsuits called "Downwinder Litigation" drew up to 5,000 complaints from locals affected by the intentional radiation discharges. Only six cases reached the level of a federal jury, and the last lawsuit was settled by the federal government in 2015. Then-Senator Barack Obama, interviewed on KNDO in Yakima in May 2008, said that he had been unaware of the Green Run during his time in the Senate.

== See also ==
- Atomic testing – Controlled detonation of nuclear weapons for scientific or political purposes
- MKUltra#1994 U.S. General Accounting Office report – CIA program involving illegal experimentation on human test subjects (1953–1972)
- Nuclear fallout – Residual radioactive material following a nuclear blast
- Nuclear and radiation accidents and incidents – Severe events involving radioactive materials
- Unethical human experimentation in the United States
