= Operation Top Hat =

1953 US Army Chemical Corps human experiment

Operation Top Hat was a "local field exercise" conducted by the United States Army Chemical Corps in 1953. The exercise involved the use of Chemical Corps personnel to test biological and chemical warfare decontamination methods. These personnel were deliberately exposed to these contaminants, so as to test decontamination.

== Background ==
In June 1953 the United States Army formally adopted guidelines regarding the use of human subjects in chemical, biological, or radiological testing and research. The guidelines were adopted per an Army Chief of Staff memo (MM 385) and closely mirrored the Nuremberg Code. These guidelines also required that all research projects involving human subjects receive approval from the Secretary of the Army. The guidelines, however, left a loophole; they did not define what types of experiments and tests required such approval from the secretary, thus encouraging "selective compliance" with the guidelines.

== Tests ==
Under the guidelines, seven research projects involving chemical weapons and human subjects were submitted by the Chemical Corps for Secretary of the Army approval in August 1953. One project involved vesicants, one involved phosgene, and five were experiments which involved nerve agents; all seven were approved. Operation Top Hat, however, was not among the projects submitted to the Secretary of the Army for approval.

Operation Top Hat was termed a "local field exercise" by the Army and took place from September 15–19, 1953, at the Army Chemical School at Fort McClellan, Alabama. In a 1975 Pentagon Inspector General's report, the military maintained Top Hat was not subject to the guidelines requiring approval because it was a "line of duty" exercise in the Chemical Corps. The experiments used Chemical Corps personnel to test decontamination methods for biological and chemical weapons, including mustard gas and nerve agents. Chemical Corps personnel participating in the tests were not volunteers and were not informed of the tests.

== See also ==
- Human experimentation in the United States
