= Operation Dew =

1950s US biological warfare tests

Operation Dew refers to two field trials conducted by the United States in the 1950s designed to study the behavior of aerosol-released biological agents.

== General description ==
Operation Dew took place from 1951 to 1952 off the southeast coast of the United States, including near Georgia, and North and South Carolina. Operation Dew consisted of two sets of trials, Dew I and Dew II. The tests involved the release of 250 pounds (110 kg) of fluorescent particles from a minesweeper off the coast. Operation Dew I was described in a U.S. Army report known as "Dugway Special Report 162", dated August 1, 1952. The purpose of Operation Dew was to study the behavior of aerosol-released biological agents.

== Dew I ==
Operation Dew I consisted of five separate trials from March 26, 1952, until April 21, 1952, designed to test the feasibility of maintaining a large aerosol cloud released offshore until it drifted over land, achieving a large area coverage. The tests released zinc cadmium sulfide along a 100-to-150-nautical-mile (190 to 280 km) line approximately 5 to 10 nautical miles (10 to 20 km) off the coast of Georgia, North Carolina and South Carolina. Two of the trials dispersed clouds of zinc cadmium sulfide over large areas of all three U.S. states. The tests affected over 60,000 square miles (150,000 km^{2}) of populated coastal region in the U.S. southeast. The Dew I releases were from a Navy minesweeper, the USS Tercel.

== Dew II ==
Dew II involved the release of fluorescent particles (zinc cadmium sulfide) and plant spores (Lycopodium) from an aircraft. Dew II was described in a 1953 Army report which remained classified at the time of a 1997 report by the U.S. National Research Council concerning the U.S. Army's zinc cadmium sulfide dispersion program of the 1950s.

== See also ==
- Human experimentation in the United States
- Operation LAC
- Project 112
