= Martin Rafferty =

American activist and philanthropist

- Born: 1987 (age 38–39)
- Occupations: Philanthropist, activist
- Years active: 2009 - present

Martin Rafferty is an American activist and philanthropist who is the founder and executive director of the non-profit organization Youth ERA (formerly known as Youth Move Oregon).

== Early life ==
Rafferty lived through a period of homelessness when he was 12. He is an adoptee.

== Career ==
Rafferty founded Youth ERA in Eugene, Oregon under the name Youth Move Oregon (Youth MVO) in 2009, when he was 22 years old. Youth ERA provides youth mental health services in areas such as peer support, crisis response, and suicide prevention.

Rafferty was named the 2013 Children’s Mental Health Advocate of the Year by the Oregon Council of Child & Adolescent Psychiatry.

Rafferty was one of eight individuals profiled in the 2017 exhibit titled “Inspiring People & Projects” at the Bill and Melinda Gates Foundation’s Discovery Center in Seattle, Washington.

Rafferty was also named one of Rising Business Stars’ 20 Under 40 in 2018.

In 2020, Rafferty and Youth ERA opened a youth drop-in center known as the Eugene Drop in Eugene. Rafferty and Youth ERA also collaborated with Oxford University to develop the pilot event Uplift in 2020, which taught participants how to exercise self-care and help prevent child abuse. Rafferty also partnered with Oxford University on a research project centered on online peer support, co-developing the peer support training program used in the project.
