= Roberts Bartholow =

American physician

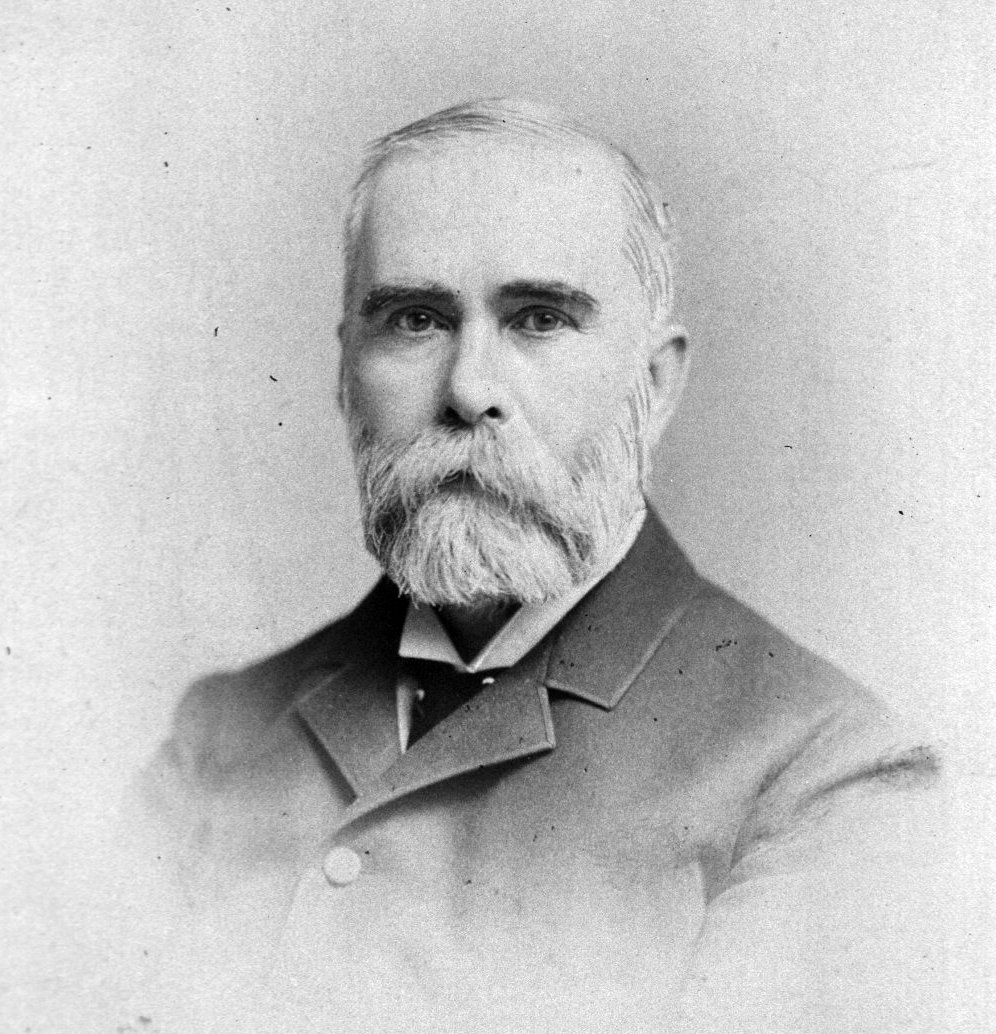
- Roberts Bartholow
- Born: November 28, 1831; New Windsor, Maryland
- Died: May 10, 1904 (aged 72); Philadelphia, Pennsylvania
- Education: University of Maryland
- Known for: Faradic electric currents to the exposed dura mater of a patient
- Scientific career
- Workplaces: Medical College of Ohio

Roberts Bartholow or Roobert Bartholow (November 28, 1831 – May 10, 1904) was an American physician and a professor at several American medical colleges. He is best known for his experiments involving a 30-year-old patient named Mary Rafferty. Rafferty was admitted to Good Samaritan Hospital in Cincinnati, Ohio in 1874 with a 2-inch-diameter (51 mm) hole in her skull caused by a cancerous ulcer. Bartholow experimented with applying current to Rafferty's exposed dura using needle electrodes. His report detailed the first observations of how electrical stimulation of the brain affects motor functions of the body, but many ethical concerns were raised about the way in which he carried out his experiments. Rafferty went into a coma for three days and then died the day after coming out of the coma from a massive seizure.

== Education and career ==
Roberts Bartholow was born in New Windsor, Maryland. He attended Calvert College in his hometown, and graduated in 1848 with a Bachelor of Arts degree. He earned his degree in medicine from the University of Maryland, Baltimore in 1852. After graduating, he worked in Baltimore's clinics and hospitals before enlisting in the army in 1857. During the Civil War, Bartholow was sent to Fort Union in New Mexico, and a series of other Union military posts in the West from 1861 to 1864. During this time, he worked as assistant surgeon and headed several military hospitals. He also published several papers including A Manual of Instructions for Enlisting and Discharging Soldiers, which was adopted at military recruiting stations to identify disqualifying diseases in recruits. He married Maria Walker in 1862 and before the war's end, he left the army and moved with his family to Cincinnati, Ohio. After his work in the army, Bartholow worked at the Medical College of Ohio where he performed research and was able to publish On Spermatorrhoea in 1866 which detailed complications with the male reproductive system. He also published The Principles and Practice of Disinfection in 1867 and two years later published A Manual of Hypodermic Medication. The latter work was fundamental in guiding physicians through the process of administering medications via syringe.

While in Cincinnati, Bartholow worked as a physician in several hospitals with rivaling medical systems. Bartholow worked with practitioners of allopathic, homeopathic, and eclectic medicine, and he used ideas from each in his research. He worked at Good Samaritan Hospital starting in 1866. He also created his own practice, which grew to be the largest in the city. From 1864 to 1879 he was a professor at the Medical College of Ohio in Cincinnati, and he accepted the position of chair of materia medica in 1869.

Following his publication of Materia Medica and Therapeutics, Bartholow accepted a professorship at the Jefferson Medical College in Philadelphia in 1879. He was elected as a member to the American Philosophical Society in 1880.

== Research methods ==
Bartholow's research often used live animals, which caused backlash from advocates of anti-vivisectionism. He argued that medical practice should be advanced beyond simply observing and comparing different patients' cases. In his view, performing experiments on live animals helps uncover basic biological mechanisms, which provides insight into what treatments are effective. He studied the effects of new drugs on animals in own his experiments, and for his later experiments on Mary Rafferty, he took inspiration from David Ferrier's experiments involving localized electrical stimulation of the brains of live dogs, cats and other non-primates.

== Challenges to medical research ==
Bartholow was also a pioneer in the field of scientific research in that unlike other researchers of his time who relied on empiricism as a standard route of attaining data and results from experimentation, Bartholow relied on an approach that stressed the importance of fundamental sciences. The method was called the “physiological method” and promoted the idea of applying medicine and research as a therapeutic method as opposed to a purely scientific endeavor. Through Bartholow's work, research became intertwined with clinical medical practice which set the stage for later medical discoveries in the modern era.

== Leadership in medicine ==
Bartholow was not only an avid researcher and practitioner, but also taught students and held many leadership roles. In 1869 he became the chair of “Professor of Materia Medica an Therapeutics and of Clinical Medicine” at the Good Samaritan Hospital. Later, he also became the “Professor of the Theory and Practice of Medicine”. Bartholow also maintained a close relationship with the American Neurological Association since its founding and was appointed president in 1881.

== Major works ==
Bartholow's major work was in the field of neurology in which he studied to excitability of the brain through the use of electrodes. He worked to understand and localize sections of the brain responsible for certain motor actions. It is still uncertain who was the first to stimulate the brain with electrodes although some historians attribute this feat to Bartholow. Bartholow performed varied experiments on animal models. One of his major works regarding the stimulation of the human brain using electrodes was published in 1874 titled Experimental investigations into the functions of the human brain. It detailed the medical story of a patient named Mary Rafferty who presented with a deleterious epithelioma. She consented to having Bartholow stimulate her brain using microcurrents. This experiment confirmed the previous findings of scientists like Gustav Fritsch and Eduard Hitzig although applied the medical knowledge to human subjects from initial findings in lower order mammals. Although his findings are considered by many to be the basis of neurology research, Bartholow faced much criticism for using Mary Rafferty as a test subject and invading the “sacred organ”. His work was and still is contested by bioethicists of the American Medical Association.

== Experiments on Mary Rafferty ==
Prior to the experiments on Marta "Mary" Rafferty, Bartholow studied the effects of electrotherapy, and used electricity in his practice at Good Samaritan Hospital for polyps, tumors, aneurysms and peripheral paralyses. These treatments used either faradic (alternating) and galvanic (direct) current, and Bartholow's main goal was to test the effects of each when applied to the human cortex. Some subgoals included comparing bodily reactions to stimuli on the left and right sides of the brain, and verifying if Ferrier's findings could be generalized to the human brain. Bartholow recorded the patient's blood pressure, arterial tension, and body temperature during the experiments to determine how safe the procedure was, and possibly study function specialization and locate cerebral embolisms.

Using a pair of electrolytic needles inserted into the dura and underlying tissues, Bartholow applied a small electric current to different sections of Rafferty's exposed brain and noticed that this caused movements in corresponding parts of her body. The low electric current he applied to the brain did not seem to cause her any pain. However, when Bartholow applied a larger amount of current, Rafferty became distressed, experienced convulsions and went into a coma. She revived from the coma three days later, but the following day she had a major seizure and died. After her death, Bartholow examined the needle wounds by cutting her brain into sections. The tracks of the wounds were filled with liquified cerebral matter, suggesting that the wounds caused a glial scar to form.

He described the experiment as follows:

When the needle entered the brain substance, she complained of acute pain in the neck. In order to develop more decided reactions, the strength of the current was increased ... her countenance exhibited great distress, and she began to cry. Very soon, the left hand was extended as if in the act of taking hold of some object in front of her; the arm presently was agitated with clonic spasm; her eyes became fixed, with pupils widely dilated; lips were blue, and she frothed at the mouth; her breathing became stertorous; she lost consciousness and was violently convulsed on the left side. The convulsion lasted five minutes, and was succeeded by a coma. She returned to consciousness in twenty minutes from the beginning of the attack, and complained of some weakness and vertigo.

— Dr. Bartholow's research report

Bartholow published his findings in his paper "Experimental Investigations into the Functions of the Human Brain" in April 1874. The paper was favorably reviewed by Ferrier, who found Bartholow's observations "quite in accordance" with the results of his own experiments when applying current to the brains of monkeys. Opponents noted that it was impossible to verify that the applied current was localized to specific sections of Rafferty's brain.

Though Bartholow claimed that he received consent from Rafferty, critics pointed out that Bartholow himself described Rafferty as "feeble-minded", which cast doubt on her ability to understand the proposed experiments. It was also known that Rafferty had sustained injuries to her brain from her ulcer, as well as from surgical incisions made to remove pus from her skull. He was also heavily criticized for carrying out the experiments with no intention of healing the patient, and for proceeding without administering anesthesia until after Rafferty experienced several seizures and was nearly unconscious. Bartholow maintained that his actions were not the ultimate cause of Rafferty's death, though he did admit that he had caused some injury. Although he was censured by the American Medical Association following the experiments, his career did not suffer. Bartholow continued to publish books and articles, and his practice remained highly popular. In 1893 he attained the title of Professor Emeritus at Jefferson Medical College in Philadelphia.

In the aftermath of the controversy, the American Medical Association banned any human experimentation that disregards saving the life of the patient. The anti-vivisectionist movement in Great Britain cited Bartholow's unethical treatment to successfully lobby bills restricting experiments on animals.

He died at his home in Philadelphia in 1904.

== Bibliography ==
- Hypodermic Medication
- Treatise on Therapeutics and Materia Medica
- Practice of Medicine
- Experimental Investigations into the Functions of the Human Brain
- Observations, pathological and experimental, on cholera

== See also ==
- Unethical human experimentation in the United States

== Sources ==
- The Concept of Bioelectromagnetism
- Mind as Mosaic {The Robot in the Machine} pp. 113–114; Bruce H. Hinrichs
- Cambiaghi Marco; Sandrone Stefano (2013). "Robert Bartholow (1831–1904)". Journal of Neurology. 261 (8): 7–8. doi:10.1007/s00415-013-7075-z. PMID 23974646. S2CID 9289066.
- Lederer, Susan (1995). Subjected To Science: Human Experimentation In America Before The Second World War. United States: Johns Hopkins University Press. pp. 7–8. ISBN 9780801857096.
- Holmes, G L (Feb 1982). "Roberts Bartholow. In search of anatomic localization". New York State Journal of Medicine. 82 (2): 238–41. ISSN 0028-7628. PMID 7043330.
