= Charles Rafferty (poet) =

American poet

Charles Rafferty is an American poet. In 2009 he received a fellowship from the National Endowment for the Arts. His poetry has appeared in The New Yorker, O: Oprah Magazine, Prairie Schooner, and Ploughshares, among other magazines, websites, and anthologies. He co-directs Albertus Magnus College's MFA in Creative Writing program, and teaches at the Westport Writers’ Workshop. As of 2021, he lives in Sandy Hook, Connecticut.

Rafferty had aspired to being a poet since high school. He began writing fiction around his late forties. He views himself as someone who "primarily...writes impressionistic, associative prose poems."

== Books ==
=== Poetry Collections ===
- The Wave That Will Beach Us Both (Still Waters Press, 1994)
- The Man on the Tower (University of Arkansas Press, 1995); winner of the Arkansas Poetry Award
- The Bog Shack (Picadilly Press, 1996)
- A Darkness With Brighter Stars (Picadilly Press, 2000)
- Where the Glories of April Lead (Mitki/Mitki Press, 2001)
- A Trayful of Brimming Martinis (Picadilly Press, 2003)
- During the Beauty Shortage (M2 Press, 2005)
- A Less Fabulous Infinity (Louisiana Literature Press, 2006)
- The Unleashable Dog (Steel Toe Books, 2014)
- DIMINUTION (Paper Nautilus Press, 2016)
- The Smoke of Horses (BOA Editions, 2017)
- Something An Atheist Might Bring Up At a Cocktail Party (Mayapple Press, 2018)
- Appetites (Clemson University Press, 2018)
- The Problem with Abundance (Grayson Books, 2019)
- Somebody Who Knows Somebody (Gold Wake Press Collective, 2021)
- A Cluster of Noisy Planets (BOA, 2021)

=== Short-story collections ===
- Saturday Night at Magellan's (Fomite, 2013)
- Somebody Who Knows Somebody (Gold Wake, 2021)

=== Novel ===
- Moscodelphia (Woodhall Press, 2021)
