= Leonard A. Cole =

American academic (1933–2022)

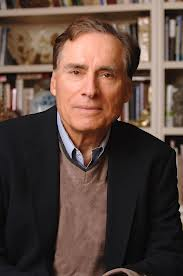
- Born: Leonard Aaron Cohen; September 1, 1933; Paterson, New Jersey, U.S.
- Died: September 18, 2022 (aged 89); Ridgewood, New Jersey, U.S.
- Education: University of California, Berkeley; University of Pennsylvania; Columbia University

Leonard Aaron Cole (September 1, 1933 – September 18, 2022), was an American dentist, political scientist and expert on bioterrorism and terror medicine. He was adjunct professor of political science at Rutgers University-Newark, New Jersey and of emergency medicine at the Rutgers New Jersey Medical School. A pioneer in developing the field of terror medicine, he was a founding director of the Program on Terror Medicine and Security at the medical school.

== Early life ==
Cole was born and named Leonard Aaron Cohen in Paterson, New Jersey, on September 1, 1933. His father, Morris Cohen, was the owner of several delis in New York City and in New Jersey; his mother, Rebecca (née Harelick), was a homemaker. Cole attended high school in his hometown and changed his surname during his youth due to fears of antisemitism. He initially studied at Indiana University, before transferring to the School of Dental Medicine at University of Pennsylvania. After graduating in 1957, he enlisted in the US Air Force and was posted in Japan for two years. Upon his return from military service, Cole was employed at a dental office in Berkeley, California, and obtained a undergraduate degree in political science from UCB. He then returned to northern Jersey and established his own family dental practice in 1961. He later undertook postgraduate studies in political science and was awarded Doctor of Philosophy from Columbia University in 1970.

== Career ==
Trained in both the health sciences as well as public policy, Cole testified before United States congressional committees and was invited to give presentations to the U.S. Department of Defense, U.S. Department of Energy, the Office of Technology Assessment, and the Centers for Disease Control and Prevention. A member of the WMD Working Group of the Aspen Institute's Homeland Security Group, Cole co-authored and edited the working group's 2012 report on WMD Terrorism. Cole's 2021 book, Chasing the Ghost: Nobelist Fred Reines and the Neutrino, was cited by Symmetry magazine as among the year's ten notable science-related titles. The book was also a 2022 Indie Book Awards finalist in the Autobiography/Biography category.

Cole was national chairman of the Jewish Council for Public Affairs from 2000 to 2002. He was a featured commentator in Avoiding Armageddon (2003), a PBS documentary on biological and chemical warfare. His book The Anthrax Letters: A Medical Detective Story was named an Honor Book by the New Jersey Council for the Humanities.

Cole served on the board of directors of the World Association for Disaster and Emergency Medicine, and on the advisory board of the International Institute for Counter-Terrorism. Appointed by the Governor of New Jersey to the New Jersey-Israel Commission, he chaired the Commission's committee on Homeland Security. In addition, he coordinated exchanges on terror medicine and domestic security between American and Israeli academics and professionals.

Cole appeared on television, and was the author or editor of eleven books. His articles appeared in several academic journals and publications, including The Washington Post, The New York Times, Los Angeles Times, The Sciences, and Scientific American. Other interviews and presentations of his were posted by the PBS NewsHour.

== Personal life ==
Cole married Ruth Gerber in 1957. They had three children and remained married until his death. They resided in Ridgewood, New Jersey, during his later years.

Cole died on September 18, 2022, at a hospital in Ridgewood. He was 89 years old.

== Awards and accolades ==
Cole was awarded grants and fellowships by the Rockefeller Foundation, the Andrew Mellon Foundation, and the National Endowment for the Humanities. He received the alumni merit award from the University of Pennsylvania School of Dental Medicine in 2008. He was a fellow of Phi Beta Kappa society and board member of the Washington Institute for Near East Policy. Formerly a board member of Columbia University's Graduate School of Arts and Sciences (GSAS) Alumni Association, he was featured in the GSAS publication, Superscript.

== Bibliography ==
- Blacks in Power: A Comparative Study of Black and White Elected Officials (1976) ISBN 9780691654720
- Politics and the Restraint of Science (1983) ISBN 9780865981256
- Clouds of Secrecy: The Army's Germ Warfare Tests Over Populated Areas (1988) ISBN 9780847675791
- Element of Risk: The Politics of Radon (1993) ISBN 9780871685131
- The Eleventh Plague: The Politics of Biological and Chemical Warfare (1997) ISBN 9780716729501
- The Anthrax Letters: A Medical Detective Story (2003) ISBN 9780309124188
- Terror: How Israel Has Coped and What America Can Learn (2007) ISBN 9780253000019
- The Anthrax Letters, Revised Edition (2009) ISBN 9781626367685
- Essentials of Terror Medicine (co-editor, 2009) ISBN 9780387094120
- Local Planning for Terror and Disaster: From Bioterrorism to Earthquakes (co-editor, 2012) ISBN 9781118397756
- Chasing the Ghost: Nobelist Fred Reines and the Neutrino (2021) ISBN 9789811231056
