= Zinc cadmium sulfide =

Mixture of zinc sulfide and cadmium sulfide

Zinc cadmium sulfide is a mixture of zinc sulfide (ZnS) and cadmium sulfide (CdS). It is used for its fluorescent properties. Bioaccumulation of this chemical may occur along the food chain, for example in plants and in seafood. Long-term or repeated exposures are expected to have harmful effects on the kidneys, bones, and respiratory tract, resulting in kidney impairment, osteoporosis (bone weakness), and chronic inflammation of the respiratory tract.

== Use ==
Operation LAC (Large Area Coverage) was a United States Army Chemical Corps operation in 1957 and 1958 which dispersed microscopic zinc cadmium sulfide (ZnCdS) particles over much of the United States. The purpose was to determine the dispersion and geographic range of biological or chemical agents. Zinc cadmium sulfide was used as it could be easily detected.

It was also used in an experiment on unwitting civilians in the UK and Canada.

== Health effects ==
Anecdotal evidence exists of ZnCdS having adverse health effects as a result of LAC. However, a 1997 U.S. government study, done by the U.S. National Research Council stated, in part, "After an exhaustive, independent review requested by Congress, we have found no evidence that exposure to zinc cadmium sulfide at these levels could cause people to become sick." It said that the material was dispersed at very low levels, and people were exposed to higher levels in typical urban environments. Responding to the 1997 study, Leonard A. Cole said that by testing ZnCdS the Army was "literally using the country as an experimental laboratory".

== See also ==
- Operation Dew
- Project SHAD
- Unethical human experimentation in the United States
