= John Chandler Rafferty =

American politician (1816-1880)

Member of the New Jersey Senate from the Hunterdon County district
- In office 1856–1859

Personal details
- Born: December 29, 1816 Woodbury, New Jersey, U.S.
- Died: December 31, 1880 (aged 64) Flemington, New Jersey, U.S.
- Party: Democratic
- Spouse: Laura E. Ogden (m. 1841; died 1864)
- Children: 4
- Education: Yale College (AB); Harvard Law School
- Occupation: Politician; lawyer; judge

John Chandler Rafferty (December 29, 1816 – December 31, 1880) was an American politician from New Jersey.

== Early life ==
John Chandler Rafferty was born on December 29, 1816, in Woodbury, New Jersey, to William Rafferty. His father was an Ireland-born reverend and served as principal of St. John's College in Annapolis, Maryland. His mother's maiden name was Chandler. He was prepared for college in Pittsfield, Massachusetts. He graduated from Yale College in 1835 with a Bachelor of Arts. He then attended lectures at Harvard Law School from 1837 to 1838 and studied law in New York City under A. D. Logan or O. W. Ogden, sources differ. He was admitted to the bar in New York City in 1838.

== Career ==
Rafferty moved to New Germantown, New Jersey, and took up residence at Barnet Hall, the home of his father-in-law, and engaged in agriculture and milling. In 1853, he was admitted to the bar in New Jersey.

Rafferty was a Democrat. In 1855, Rafferty was elected to the New Jersey Senate to represent Hunterdon County and served in that role until 1859. He was elected as secretary of the senate of New Jersey from 1859 to 1860 and in 1860 was elected again to the New Jersey Senate. He was a delegate of the 1860 Democratic National Convention.

In 1862, Rafferty moved to Flemington and practiced law there. In 1863, he became licensed as a counselor and was appointed by governor Joel Parker as military agent for New Jersey in the American Civil War. He served in that role for three years in Washington, D.C., until March 1866. From 1867 to 1869, he was county superintendent of schools in Hunterdon County. In 1870, he served again as secretary of the senate. In 1872, he was appointed to fill a vacancy in the Court of Common Pleas. In 1877, he became prosecutor of the pleas for Hunterdon County. He served in that role until his death.

== Personal life ==
Rafferty married Laura E. Ogden, daughter of Oliver Wayne Ogden, in 1841. They had two sons and two daughters, William A., Ogden, Mary, and Mrs. George H. Ross. His wife died in 1864. He lived near New Germantown from 1841 to 1862. In 1862, he moved to Flemington, New Jersey. In May 1874, he became affiliated with the Presbyterian church.

Rafferty died on December 31, 1880, at his home in Flemington.
