= Bacillus atrophaeus =

Scientific classification
- Domain: Bacteria
- Kingdom: Bacillati
- Phylum: Bacillota
- Class: Bacilli
- Order: Bacillales
- Family: Bacillaceae
- Genus: Bacillus
- Species: B. atrophaeus

Binomial name
- Bacillus atrophaeus Nakamura 1989

Synonyms
- Heterotypic synonyms: "Bacillus globigii" Migula 1900; "red strain" Migula 1900; "Bacillus niger" Migula 1900; "Bacillus subtilis var. niger" (Migula 1900) Smith et al. 1946

Species of bacterium

Bacillus atrophaeus is a species of black-pigmented bacteria. Its type strain is NRRL NRS-213. B. atrophaeus strains have been used extensively in biomedicine as indicator strains for heat- and chemical-based decontamination regimens. Most of the strains in use are derivatives of a lineage of B. atrophaeus that originated at Camp Detrick in the 1950s, where many modern biocontainment procedures were developed.

B. atrophaeus has historically been known by several other names, including B. globigii (the origin of its military moniker "BG") and B. subtilis var. niger. Modern phylogenetic analyses using multiple genetic methods have placed B. atrophaeus close to B. subtilis.

Its original and still most prominent use is as a surrogate organism for pathogenic B. anthracis, beginning in the U.S. bio-weapons program, as its pigmentation readily facilitated discrimination from non-pigmented background organisms in environmental samples. Subsequent genomic and phenotypic analysis of strains derived from the Camp Detrick isolates revealed that they had been deliberately selected to exhibit elevated rates of sporulation.
