= Operation Magic Sword =

1965 US entomological warfare test

Operation Magic Sword was a 1965 U.S. military operation designed to test the effectiveness of the sea-borne release of insect vectors for biological agents.

== Operation ==
Operation Magic Sword was U.S. military operation undertaken in 1965. It was designed to ascertain the effectiveness of releasing mosquito vectors for biological agents at sea. It took place off the southeastern coast of the United States and employed yellow fever mosquitoes with the hope of assessing their biting habits following an ocean-borne release.

== Results ==
Magic Sword showed that when coupled with ocean winds that the mosquitoes could travel up to three and one-half miles to shore. The operation also showed that if needed the mosquitoes could be kept alive for cross-ocean journeys.

== See also ==
- Entomological warfare
- Human experimentation in the United States
- Operation Big Itch
- Operation Big Buzz
