= Unconventional warfare =

Opposite of conventional warfare

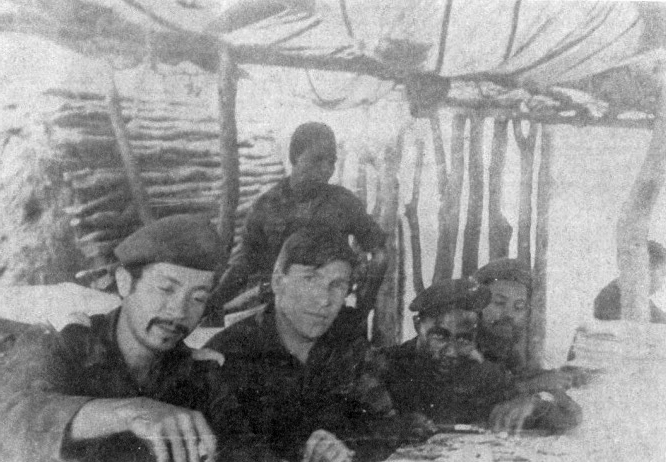
Soviet Armed Forces members instruct Namibian SWAPO insurgents.

Unconventional warfare (UW) is broadly defined as "military and quasi-military operations other than conventional warfare" and may use covert forces or actions such as subversion, diversion, sabotage, espionage, biowarfare, sanctions, propaganda or guerrilla warfare. This is typically done to avoid escalation into conventional warfare as well as international conventions.

== Description ==
Aside from the earlier definition of "warfare that is not conventional", unconventional warfare has also been described as:

Another type of warfare— new in its intensity, ancient in its origin—war by guerrillas, subversives, insurgents, assassins; war by ambush instead of by combat, by infiltration instead of aggression, seeking victory by eroding and exhausting the enemy instead of engaging him. It preys on unrest.

== Methods and organization ==
Unconventional warfare targets the civilian population psychologically to win hearts and minds, and only targets military and political bodies for that purpose, seeking to render the military proficiency of the enemy irrelevant. Limited conventional warfare tactics can be used unconventionally to demonstrate might and power, rather than to reduce the enemy's ability to fight substantially. In addition to the surgical application of traditional weapons, other armaments that specifically target the military can be used are: airstrikes, nuclear weapons, incendiary devices, or other such weapons.

Special forces, inserted deep behind enemy lines, are used unconventionally to train, equip, and advise locals who oppose their government. They can also spread subversion and propaganda, while they aid native resistance fighters, to ultimately cause a hostile government to capitulate. Tactics focus on destroying military targets while avoiding damage to civilian infrastructure and blockading military resupply are used to decrease the morale of government forces.

Unconventional warfare structure by guerrilla organizations.

The U.S. Department of Defense defines unconventional warfare as activities conducted to enable a resistance movement or insurgency to coerce, disrupt, or overthrow a government or occupying power by operating through or with an underground, auxiliary, and guerrilla force in a denied area.

== History ==
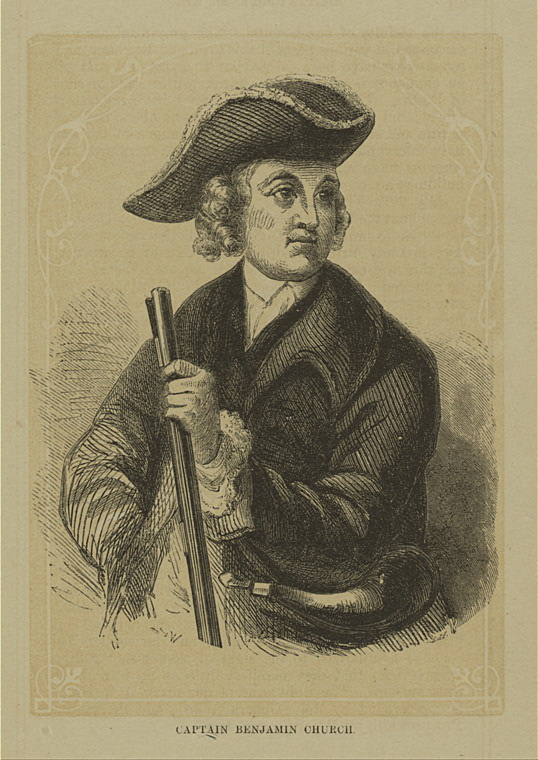
Colonel Benjamin Church (1639–1718) from the Plymouth Colony, father of unconventional warfare, American Ranging, and Rangers

Between the 17th and 18th centuries, there were wars between American colonists and Native American tribes. Benjamin Church designed his force primarily to emulate Native American patterns of war. Toward this end, Church endeavored to learn to fight like Native Americans from Native Americans. Americans became rangers exclusively under the tutelage of the Native American allies. (Until the end of the colonial period, rangers depended on Native Americans as both allies and teachers.)

Church developed a special full-time unit mixing white colonists selected for frontier skills with friendly Native Americans to carry out offensive strikes against hostile Native Americans in terrain where normal militia units were ineffective. Church paid special care to outfitting, supplying and instructing his troops in ways inspired by indigenous methods of warfare and ways of living. He emphasized the adoption of indigenous techniques, which prioritized small, mobile and flexible units which used the countryside for cover, in lieu of massed frontal assaults by large formations. Church also pioneered the use of indigenous warriors as auxiliaries to bolster and educate his soldiers. In 1716, his memoirs, entitled Entertaining Passages relating to Philip's War, was published and is considered by some to constitute the first American military manual and first written guide to unconventional warfare. Benjamin Church is sometimes referred to as the father of unconventional warfare. The ideas of Benjamin Church were widely incorporated into warfare by early colonial officers, especially by American colonialists who prevailed in the Revolutionary War against the British Empire.

=== Atomic Age ===
The advent of the Atomic Age changed forever philosophies of conventional warfare, and the necessity to conceal authorship of actions by hostile states. The age of asymmetric, or unconventional warfare & terrorism had begun.

One of the first references is in "Manpower and Atomic War," which Edward Fitzpatrick referred to as "the next kind of war- technological war, machine war, or atomic war."

Using soft power methods, to target civilians instead of military units, however had begun earlier, particularly as a strategy for use against Republics. These were developed as a tool of national socialism, or neo-liberalism, and evolved into other doctrines.

There is an overlap in the world of Corporate Security & Defense Contracting where these models have extended to the field of Risk assessment. One of the first instances of Unconventional Warfare techniques against civilians was documented by the La Follette Committee.

== See also ==
- Asymmetric warfare
- Counterintelligence
- Gerasimov Doctrine
- Hybrid warfare
- Fourth generation warfare
- Full-spectrum dominance
- Irregular military
- Irregular warfare
- Low intensity conflict
- New generation warfare
- Partisan (military)
- Political warfare
- Psychological warfare
- Resistance movement
- Six-legged Soldiers
- Terrorism
- Total Resistance (book)
- Unrestricted Warfare

US & NATO specific:

- Operation Gladio
- Project Eldest Son
- Ranger Regiment (United Kingdom)
- Reagan Doctrine
- U.S. Army Special Forces
