= Drop kick (disambiguation) =

A drop kick, in various types of football, is dropping the ball and kicking it after it has bounced.

A dropkick is an attacking maneuver in professional wrestling.

Drop kick or dropkick may also refer to:

== Arts and entertainment ==
- The Drop Kick, 1927 movie about a college football player
- Dropkick (Transformers), a Decepticon pickup truck
- Drop Kick (album), 1992 jazz album by Steve Coleman
- Dropkick Murphys, a Celtic punk band formed in Massachusetts, U.S.

== People ==
- Dropkick Daniels (Joseph Bruce, born 1972), ring name of professional wrestler, stagename Violent J
- Dropkick Murphy (1912–1977), American professional wrestler and sanatorium owner

== Other uses ==
- Operation Drop Kick, a 1956 US entomological warfare field testing program
- "Dropkick", a 2023 song by &Team

== See also ==
- "Drop Kick Me Jesus (Through The Goalposts Of Life)", a 1976 country waltz by Bobby Bare
- "Dropkick on My Devil!, a Japanese manga series that debuted in 2012
