= TGE =

TGE may refer to:

- Ali Raymi, undefeated boxer nicknamed "The Greatest Ever"
- MAN TGE, a commercial vehicle based on the Volkswagen Crafter
- Team Global Express, a division of an Australian transportation and logistics company
- The Generation Essentials Group, a French media and entertainment company
- Torque (game engine), an open-source 3D game engine
- Sharpe Field (IATA: TGE), a private American airport
- Transient expression, a gene expression
- Transitional Government of Ethiopia
- Transmissible gastroenteritis
