= Horizontal Environmental Genetic Alteration Agents =

GM virus environmental technique

Horizontal Environmental Genetic Alteration Agents (HEGAAs) are any artificially developed agents that are engineered to edit the genome of eukaryotic species they infect when intentionally dispersed into the environment (outside of contained facilities such as laboratories or hospitals).

== History ==
The term “genetic alteration agent” first appears in a 2016 work plan by the Defense Advanced Research Projects Agency (DARPA) describing a tender for contracts to develop genetically modified plant viruses for an approach involving their dispersion into the environment. The prefixing of “horizontal environmental” to the former to generate the acronym HEGAA was first used in a 2018 scientific publication. The acronym HEGAA or its plural HEGAAs has subsequently been used in scientific defence and general media.

== General usage ==
Agents such as pathogens, symbionts or synthetic protein assemblages that can be acquired through horizontal transmission in the environment can potentially be engineered to become HEGAAs. This would be achieved using biotechnology methods to confer to them the capacity to alter nucleotides in the chromosomes of infected individuals through sequence-specific editing systems like CRISPR, ZFNs or TALENs. No known infectious agent naturally has the capacity to gene edit eukaryotes in a manner that can be flexibly targeted to specific sequences (distinct from substantially random natural processes like retroviral integration).

By definition, HEGAA induced gene editing events are intended to occur outside of contained facilities such as laboratories or hospitals. While genetically modified viruses with CRISPR editing have been successfully used as research tools in laboratories or for gene therapy in clinical settings, all gene editing events are intended to physically occur within contained facilities. By contrast, HEGAAs for their intended mode of action relies on inducing gene editing events that occur largely or exclusively in the environment.

Where HEGAAs are engineered to target obligate sexually reproducing species they can usefully be thought of being of two types:-

- Somatic-HEGAAs: all genetic alterations introduced by gene editing of the host's genome do not impact tissues that can ultimately generate germline cells. Consequently, no genetic alterations arising as a consequence of gene editing events are inherited by the offspring of infected individuals. Applications using somatic-HEGAAs are intended to only manipulate traits of the individual they have infected.
- Germline-HEGAAs: genetic alterations introduced by gene editing impact somatic cells and also cell lineages from which germline cells can be ultimately generated (e.g. sperm, oocytes, pollen, ovules, zygotes or seeds). Consequently, alterations arising as a consequence of gene editing events can potentially be inherited by the offspring of any infected individuals. Applications using germline-HEGAAs share the same potential to manipulate traits in the individual they have infected, but also have the capacity to alter the genetic material of subsequent generations through inheritance of gene edits. Note that the detectable presence of HEGAAs in sperm, oocytes, pollen, ovules or seeds is not a necessary requirement for germline-HEGAAs, as transient infection of cell lineages from which they ultimately arise is sufficient.

Where HEGAAs are engineered to target host species that can reproduce asexually, for example vegetatively reproducing plants, the above distinctions are largely no longer meaningful.

Despite an expanding number of techniques which employ engineered infectious agents to alter the genetic material of a second species, often involving genetically modified viruses, only a very small minority rely on gene editing events occurring in the environment. Furthermore, while there are a number of proposed applications which rely on the intentional dispersion of genetically modified infectious agents in the environment, only those where gene editing occurs are considered HEGAAs. Consequently, proposed applications of viral immuno-contraception, transmissible vaccines, and agricultural field transient expression systems are not examples of HEGAA approaches, because none currently involve gene editing. HEGAAs are only those agents that are proposed for applications that require both horizontal acquisition (infection) and gene editing events that are intended to occur in the environment.

No HEGAAs have been intentionally dispersed into the environment, though some are reportedly in development.

== HEGAAs in development ==
=== Insect Allies program ===
Horizontal Environmental Genetic Alteration Agents is agricultural technology currently being developed by DARPA to ensure long term food security. It is under research in DARPA known as the Insect Allies project. On a high level, insects serve as vectors to "infect" crops with a virus to alter their genes to become more resilient against pests, weeds and climate changes.

== HEGAA like scenarios in fiction ==
Fictional plagues of engineered pathogens have been a feature of science fiction literature considerably prior to the advent of targetable gene editing systems. However, despite informed conjecture in media sources or reports on HEGAA like scenarios, there have been few in a fictional context.

An example of a HEGAA like scenario is a storyline in the season 10 of The X-files, with a virus engineered to contain a CRISPR system targeted to disrupt the sequence of the human adenosine deaminase gene. Gene editing of the virus is triggered in the environment as a means to destroy the human immune system in the fictional story.
