= Operation May Day =

1956 US entomological warfare tests

Operation May Day was a series of entomological warfare (EW) tests conducted by the U.S. military in Savannah, Georgia, in 1956.

== Operation ==
Operation May Day involved a series of EW tests from April to November 1956. The tests were designed to reveal information about the dispersal of yellow fever mosquitoes in an urban area. The mosquitoes were released from ground level in Savannah, Georgia, and then recovered using traps baited with dry ice. The operation was detailed in a partially declassified U.S. Army report in 1981.

== See also ==
- Human experimentation in the United States
- Operation Big Buzz
- Operation Big Itch
- Operation Drop Kick
