= Genetically modified virus =

Species of virus

A genetically modified virus is a virus that has been altered or generated using biotechnology methods, and remains capable of infection. Genetic modification involves the directed insertion, deletion, artificial synthesis or change of nucleotide bases in viral genomes. Genetically modified viruses are mostly generated by the insertion of foreign genes into viral genomes for the purposes of biomedical, agricultural, bio-control, or technological objectives. The terms genetically modified virus and genetically engineered virus are used synonymously.

== General usage ==
Genetically modified viruses are generated through genetic modification, which involves the directed insertion, deletion, artificial synthesis, or change of nucleotide sequences in viral genomes using biotechnological methods. While most dsDNA viruses have single monopartite genomes, many RNA viruses have multipartite genomes, it is not necessary for all parts of a viral genome to be genetically modified for the virus to be considered a genetically modified virus. Infectious viruses capable of infection that are generated through artificial gene synthesis of all, or part of their genomes (for example based on inferred historical sequences) may also be considered as genetically modified viruses. Viruses that are changed solely through the action of spontaneous mutations, recombination or reassortment events (even in experimental settings), are not generally considered to be genetically modified viruses.

Viruses are generally modified so they can be used as vectors for inserting new genetic information into a host organism or altering its preexisting genetic material. This can be achieved in at least three processes :

1. Integration of all, or parts, of a viral genome into the host's genome (e.g. into its chromosomes). When the whole genetically modified viral genome is integrated it is then referred to as a genetically modified provirus. Where DNA or RNA which that has been packaged as part of a virus particle, but may not necessarily contain any viral genes, becomes integrated into a hosts genome this process is known as transduction.
2. Maintenance of the viral genome within host cells but not as an integrated part of the host's genome.
3. Where genes necessary for genome editing have been placed into the viral genome using biotechnology methods, editing of the host's genome is possible. This process does not require the integration of viral genomes into the host's genome.

None of these three processes are mutually exclusive. Where only process 2. occurs and it results in the expression of a genetically modified gene this will often be referred to as a transient expression approach.

The capacity to infect host cells or tissues is a necessary requirement for all applied uses of genetically modified viruses. However, a capacity for viral transmission (the transfer of infections between host individuals), is either not required or is considered undesirable for most applications. Only in a small minority of proposed uses is viral transmission considered necessary or desirable, an example is transmissible vaccines. This is because transmissibility considerably complicates efforts to monitor, control, or contain the spread of viruses.

== History ==
In 1972, the earliest report of the insertion of a foreign sequence into a viral genome was published, when Paul Berg used the EcoRI restriction enzyme and DNA ligases to create the first ever recombinant DNA molecules. This was achieved by joining DNA from the monkey SV40 virus with that of the lambda virus. However, it was not established that either of the two viruses were capable of infection or replication.

In 1974, the first report of a genetically modified virus that could also replicate and infect was submitted for publication by Noreen Murray and Kenneth Murray. Just two months later in August 1974, Marjorie Thomas, John Cameron and Ronald W. Davis submitted a report for publication of a similar achievement.

Collectively, these experiments represented the very start of the development of what would eventually become known as biotechnology or recombinant DNA methods.

== Health applications ==
=== Gene therapy ===
Gene therapy uses genetically modified viruses to deliver genes that can cure diseases in human cells. These viruses can deliver DNA or RNA genetic material to the targeted cells. Gene therapy is also used by inactivating mutated genes that are causing the disease using viruses.

Viruses that have been used for gene therapy are, adenovirus, lentivirus, retrovirus and the herpes simplex virus. The most common virus used for gene delivery come from adenoviruses as they can carry up to 7.5 kb of foreign DNA and infect a relatively broad range of host cells, although they have been known to elicit immune responses in the host and only provide short term expression. Other common vectors are adeno-associated viruses, which have lower toxicity and longer term expression, but can only carry about 4kb of DNA. Herpes simplex viruses is a promising vector, have a carrying capacity of over 30kb and provide long term expression, although it is less efficient at gene delivery than other vectors. The best vectors for long term integration of the gene into the host genome are retroviruses, but their propensity for random integration is problematic. Lentiviruses are a part of the same family as retroviruses with the advantage of infecting both dividing and non-dividing cells, whereas retroviruses only target dividing cells. Other viruses that have been used as vectors include alphaviruses, flaviviruses, measles viruses, rhabdoviruses, Newcastle disease virus, poxviruses, and picornaviruses.

Although primarily still at trial stages, it has had some successes. It has been used to treat inherited genetic disorders such as severe combined immunodeficiency rising from adenosine deaminase deficiency (ADA-SCID), although the development of leukemia in some ADA-SCID patients along with the death of Jesse Gelsinger in another trial set back the development of this approach for many years. In 2009 another breakthrough was achieved when an eight year old boy with Leber’s congenital amaurosis regained normal eyesight and in 2016 GlaxoSmithKline gained approval to commercialise a gene therapy treatment for ADA-SCID. As of 2018, there are a substantial number of clinical trials underway, including treatments for hemophilia, glioblastoma, chronic granulomatous disease, cystic fibrosis and various cancers. Although some successes, gene therapy is still considered a risky technique and studies are still undergoing to ensure safety and effectiveness.

=== Cancer treatment ===
Another potential use of genetically modified viruses is to alter them so they can directly treat diseases. This can be through expression of protective proteins or by directly targeting infected cells. In 2004, researchers reported that a genetically modified virus that exploits the selfish behaviour of cancer cells might offer an alternative way of killing tumours. Since then, several researchers have developed genetically modified oncolytic viruses that show promise as treatments for various types of cancer.

=== Vaccines ===
Most vaccines consist of viruses that have been attenuated, disabled, weakened or killed in some way so that their virulent properties are no longer effective. Genetic engineering could theoretically be used to create viruses with the virulent genes removed. In 2001, it was reported that genetically modified viruses can possibly be used to develop vaccines against diseases such as, AIDS, herpes, dengue fever and viral hepatitis by using a proven safe vaccine virus, such as adenovirus, and modify its genome to have genes that code for immunogenic proteins that can spike the immune systems response to then be able to fight the virus. Genetic engineered viruses should not have reduced infectivity, invoke a natural immune response and there is no chance that they will regain their virulence function, which can occur with some other vaccines. As such they are generally considered safer and more efficient than conventional vaccines, although concerns remain over non-target infection, potential side effects and horizontal gene transfer to other viruses. Another approach is to use vectors to create novel vaccines for diseases that have no vaccines available or the vaccines that are do not work effectively, such as AIDS, malaria, and tuberculosis. Vector-based vaccines have already been approved and many more are being developed.

=== Heart pacemaker ===
In 2012, US researchers reported that they injected a genetically modified virus into the heart of pigs. This virus inserted into the heart muscles a gene called Tbx18 which enabled heartbeats. The researchers forecast that one day this technique could be used to restore the heartbeat in humans who would otherwise need electronic pacemakers.

== Genetically modified viruses intended for use in the environment ==
=== Animals ===
In Spain and Portugal, by 2005 rabbits had declined by as much as 95% over 50 years due diseases such as myxomatosis, rabbit haemorrhagic disease and other causes. This in turn caused declines in predators like the Iberian lynx, a critically endangered species. In 2000 Spanish researchers investigated a genetically modified virus which might have protected rabbits in the wild against myxomatosis and rabbit haemorrhagic disease. However, there was concern that such a virus might make its way into wild populations in areas such as Australia and create a population boom. Rabbits in Australia are considered to be such a pest that land owners are legally obliged to control them.

Genetically modified viruses that make the target animals infertile through immunocontraception have been created as well as others that target the developmental stage of the animal. There are concerns over virus containment and cross species infection.

=== Trees ===
Since 2009 genetically modified viruses expressing spinach defensin proteins have been field trialed in Florida (USA). The virus infection of orange trees aims to combat citrus greening disease, that had reduced orange production in Florida 70% since 2005. A permit application has been pending since February 13, 2017 (USDA 17-044-101r) to extend the experimental use permit to an area of 513,500 acres, this would make it the largest permit of this kind ever issued by the USDA Biotechnology Regulatory Services.

=== Insect Allies program ===
In 2016 DARPA, an agency of the U.S. Department of Defense, announced a tender for contracts to develop genetically modified plant viruses for an approach involving their dispersion into the environment using insects. The work plan stated:

“Plant viruses hold significant promise as carriers of gene editing circuitry and are a natural partner for an insect-transmitted delivery platform.”

The motivation provided for the program is to ensure food stability by protecting agricultural food supply and commodity crops:

"By leveraging the natural ability of insect vectors to deliver viruses with high host plant specificity, and combining this capability with advances in gene editing, rapid enhancement of mature plants in the field can be achieved over large areas and without the need for industrial infrastructure.”

Despite its name, the “Insect Allies” program is to a large extent a viral program, developing viruses that would essentially perform gene editing of crops in already-planted fields. The genetically modified viruses described in the work plan and other public documents are of a class of genetically modified viruses subsequently termed HEGAAs (horizontal environmental gene alteration agents). The Insect Allies program is scheduled to run from 2017 to 2021 with contracts being executed by three consortia. There are no plans to release the genetically modified viruses into the environment, with testing of the full insect dispersed system occurring in greenhouses (Biosafety level 3 facilities have been mentioned).

Concerns have been expressed about how this program and any data it generates will impact biological weapon control and agricultural coexistence, though there has also been support for its stated objectives.

== Technological applications ==
=== Lithium-ion batteries ===
In 2009, MIT scientists created a genetically modified virus that has been used to construct a more environmentally friendly lithium-ion battery. The battery was constructed by genetically engineering different viruses such as, the E4 bacteriophage and the M13 bacteriophage, to be used as a cathode. This was done by editing the genes of the virus that code for the protein coat. The protein coat is edited to coat itself in iron phosphate to be able to adhere to highly conductive carbon-nanotubes. The viruses that have been modified to have a multifunctional protein coat can be used as a nano-structured cathode with causes ionic interactions with cations. Allowing the virus to be used as a small battery. Angela Blecher, the scientist who led the MIT research team on the project, says that the battery is powerful enough to be used as a rechargeable battery, power hybrid electric cars, and a number of personal electronics. While both the E4 and M13 viruses can infect and replicate within their bacterial host, it unclear if they retain this capacity after being part of a battery.

== Safety concerns and regulation ==
=== Bio-hazard research limitations ===
The National Institute of Health declared a research funding moratorium on select Gain-of-Function virus research in January 2015. In January 2017, the U.S. Government released final policy guidance for the review and oversight of research anticipated to create, transfer, or use enhanced potential pandemic pathogens (PPP). Questions about a potential escape of a modified virus from a biosafety lab and the utility of dual-use-technology, dual use research of concern (DURC), prompted the NIH funding policy revision.

=== GMO lentivirus incident ===
A scientist claims she was infected by a genetically modified virus while working for Pfizer. In her federal lawsuit she says she has been intermittently paralyzed by the Pfizer-designed virus. "McClain, of Deep River, suspects she was inadvertently exposed, through work by a former Pfizer colleague in 2002 or 2003, to an engineered form of the lentivirus, a virus similar to the one that can lead to acquired immune deficiency syndrome, or AIDS." The court found that McClain failed to demonstrate that her illness was caused by exposure to the lentivirus, but also that Pfizer violated whistleblower protection laws.
