= Project Eldest Son =

Covert US military operation in Vietnam

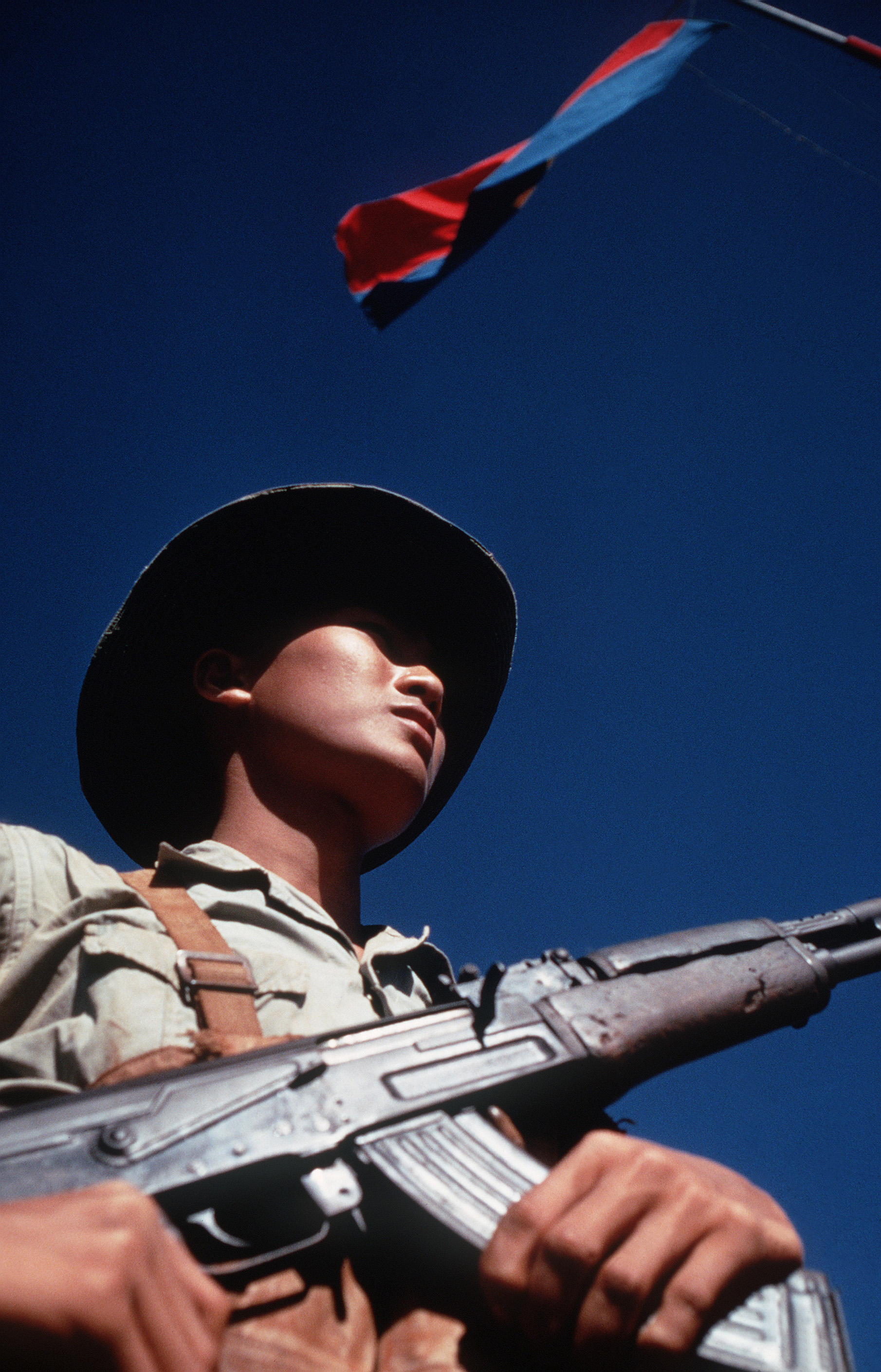
Viet Cong soldier with a Type 2 AK-47 rifle.

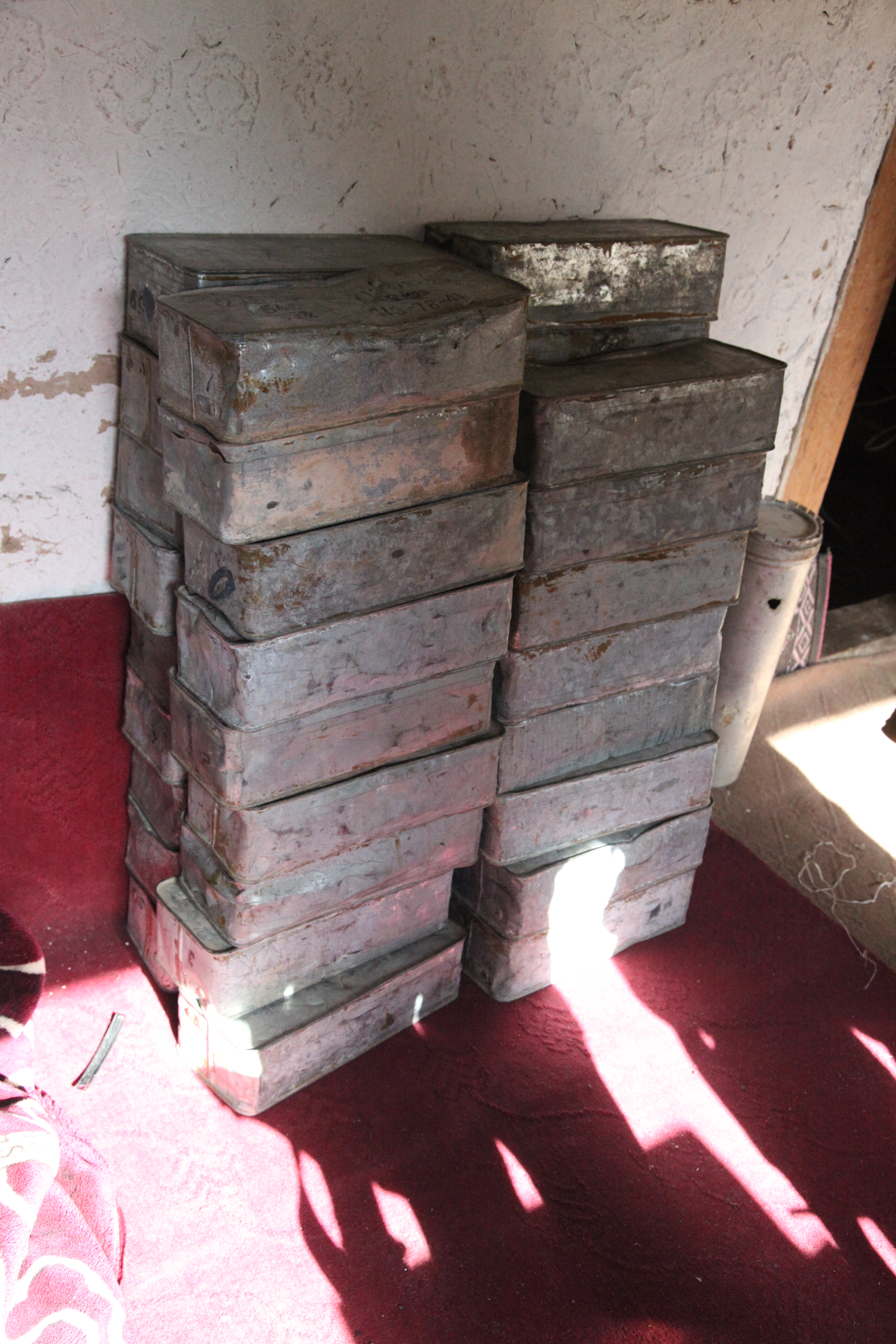
Only one sabotaged cartridge would be placed in a magazine or case of good ammunition

Project Eldest Son (also known as "Italian Green" and later "Pole Bean") was a program of covert operations conducted by the United States' Studies and Observation Group (SOG) during the Vietnam War. The project focused on placement of exploding ammunition into supplies used by Communist combat forces in Southeast Asia. United States technicians assembled 11,565 7.62×39mm cartridges for AK-47 rifles, 556 12.7×108mm heavy machine gun cartridges, and 1,968 82mm Type 67 mortar shells to detonate in the weapon when firing was attempted. Project Eldest Son is an example of unconventional warfare. The missions under this program were implemented successfully in Vietnam, Cambodia, and Laos.

== History ==
Small arms ammunition sabotage had previously been employed by the United Kingdom against rebellious tribesmen during the Second Matabele War (1896–1897) and the Waziristan campaign (1936–1939). In both cases, ammunition sabotage had been effective because the tribesmen were heavily reliant on salvaged ammunition rather than an industrialized supply chain of newly manufactured ammunition. Colonel John K. Singlaub, a World War II veteran of the Office of Strategic Services, suggested similar methods while he commanded SOG from 1966 to 1968.

== Methods ==
Captured ammunition was partially disassembled and reassembled with substituted components. Rifle and machine gun cartridges had the smokeless powder replaced with a high explosive of similar appearance which would generate approximately five times the design pressure of a given firearm. The bolt and pieces of an exploding AK-47 receiver would typically be projected backward into the head of the individual firing the rifle. While the AKM and Type 56 AKs and the RPD light machine gun could accommodate a chamber pressure of 45,000 psi, the sabotaged ammunition generated 250,000 psi. Substitute fuzes were placed in the sabotaged mortar shells to detonate the shell inside the barrel instead of on impact with the intended target. Explosions of crew-served machine guns and mortars often killed or injured anyone near the exploding weapon. On July 3, 1968, after an enemy mortar attack on Ban Me Thuot airstrip, nine Communist soldiers were found dead in one firing position, their mortar tube so badly shattered that it had vanished but for two small fragments.

A single sabotaged cartridge or shell would then be placed in a magazine or case of good ammunition to avoid revealing the cause of the explosion. These sabotaged ammunition containers were carried by SOG-Green Beret patrols and left behind when guerrilla ammunition stashes were discovered. A few stashes were created where circumstances might be interpreted as indicating the troops transporting or storing that ammunition had been killed.

== Goals ==
The goal of the project was to cause the enemy to question the safety of their ordnance. Physical damage and injuries observable by Communist forces were augmented by forged documents to generate mistrust between Vietnamese troops and Chinese suppliers. One pretending to be a Viet Cong document acknowledged rumors of exploding ammunition, but portrayed them as an exaggeration of a negligibly small problem. Another acknowledged a few thousand problems resulting from poor Chinese quality control, but estimated future risks would be less. Official documents distributed to U.S. forces with the assumption they would reach Communist hands advised troops not to use captured AK-47s because faulty metallurgy caused them to explode when fired.

== Termination ==
Some details of Project Eldest Son were revealed in United States news publications in 1969 when less than half of the sabotaged rounds had been placed. The project was renamed Italian Green and then Pole Bean and an accelerated placement program was initiated to utilize as much as possible before authority for the program expired. These conditions allowed Communist forces to ascertain the true cause of their weapon failures, but raised doubt about the safety of their ammunition supplies in combat areas.
