= Explosive weapon =

Type of weapon

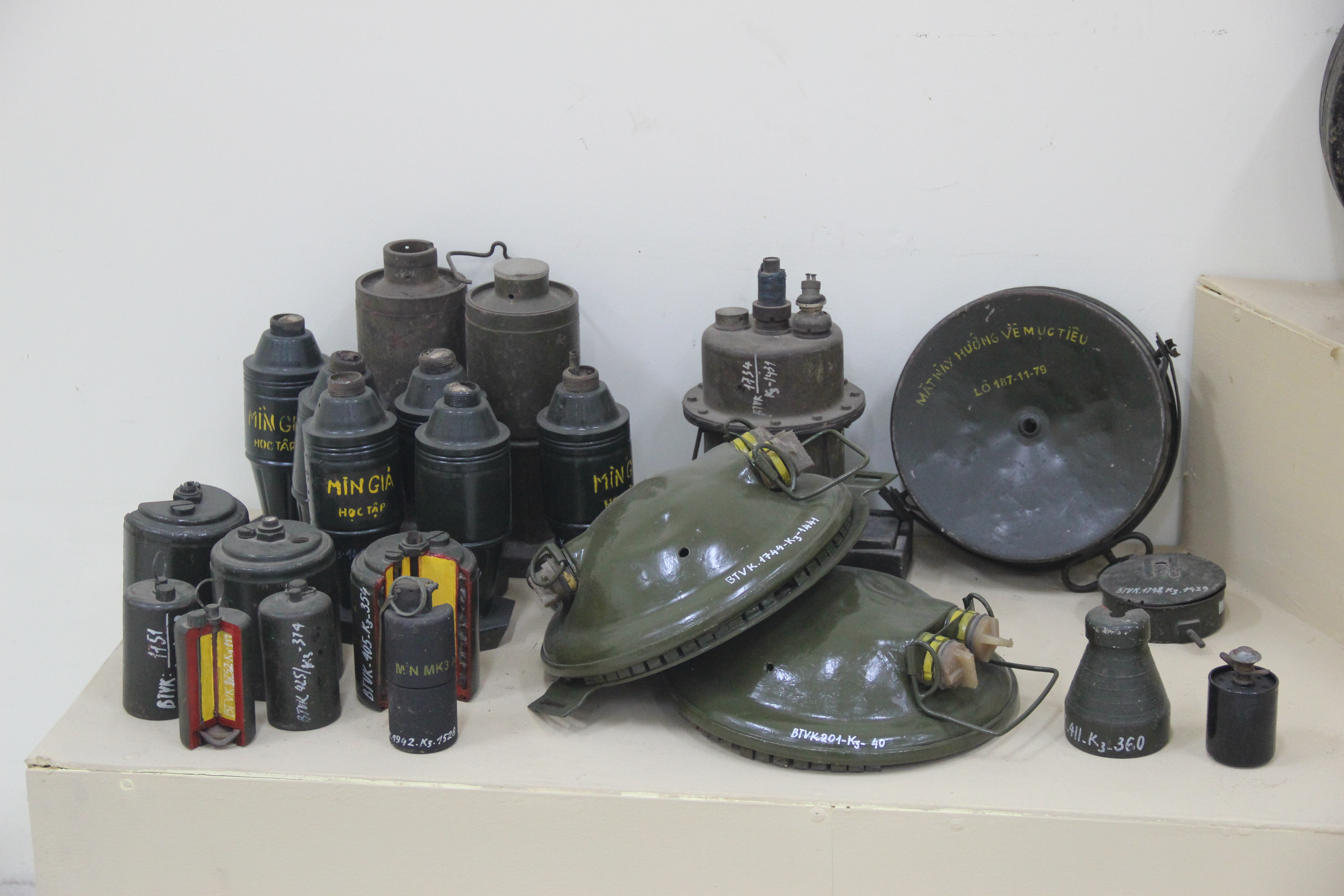
Several grenades and land mines on display in Hanoi

An explosive weapon is a weapon that uses an explosive to project blast and/or fragmentation from a point of detonation.

In the common practice of states, explosive weapons are generally the preserve of the military, for use in situations of armed conflict, and are rarely used for purposes of domestic policing.

When explosive weapons fail to function as designed they are often left as unexploded ordnance (UXO).

== Classification ==
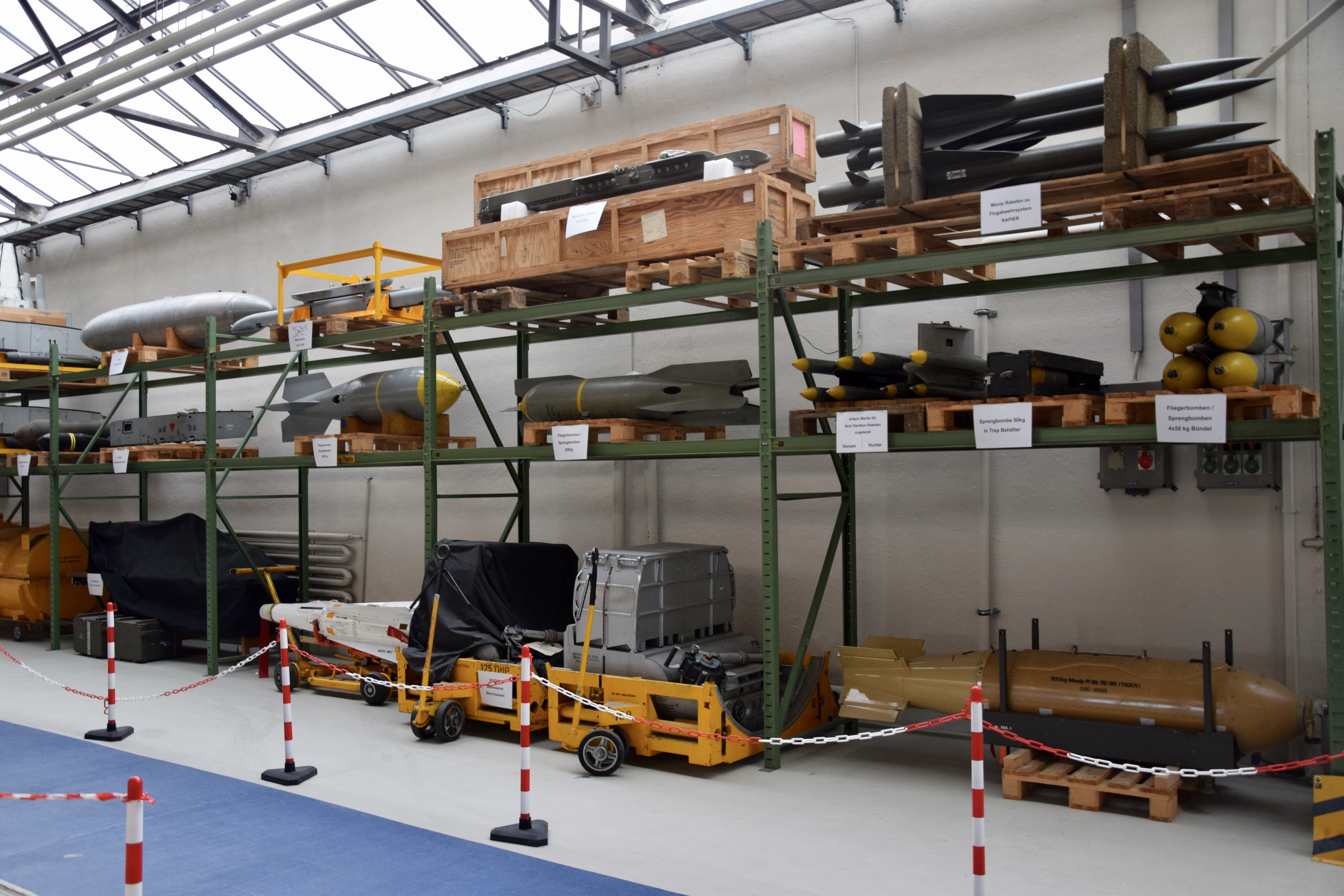
Explosive aircraft ordnance, among other aircraft payloads, at the Flieger Flab Museum

Explosive weapons may be subdivided by their method of manufacture into explosive ordnance and improvised explosive devices (IEDs). Certain types of explosive ordnance and many improvised explosive devices are sometimes referred to under the generic term bomb.

Certain types of explosive weapons may be categorized as light weapons (e.g. grenades, grenade launchers, rocket launchers, anti-tank guided missile launchers, man-portable air-defense systems, and mortars of calibers of less than 100 mm). Many explosive weapons, such as aerial bombs, multiple rocket launchers, artillery, and larger mortars, are categorized as heavy weapons.

== Humanitarian impact ==
In armed conflict, the general rules of international humanitarian law governing the conduct of hostilities apply to the use of all types of explosive weapons as means or methods of warfare.

Taken in combination, Amended Protocol II and Protocol V to the United Nations Convention on Certain Conventional Weapons establish a responsibility on the users of explosive weapons to record and retain information on their use of such weapons (including the location of use and the type and quantity of weapons used), to provide such information to parties in control of territory that may be affected by UXO, and to assist with the removal of this threat.

Certain types of explosive weapons have been subject to prohibition in international treaties. The Saint Petersburg Declaration of 1868 prohibits the use of certain explosive rifle projectiles. This prohibition has evolved into a ban on exploding ammunition under customary international humanitarian law binding on all States. The 1997 Mine Ban Treaty and the 2008 Convention on Cluster Munitions also prohibit types of explosive weapons, anti-personnel landmines and cluster munitions, for states parties to these treaties.

The Secretary-General of the United Nations has expressed increasing concern at "the humanitarian impact of explosive weapons, in particular when used in densely populated areas." The President of the International Committee of the Red Cross (ICRC), Jakob Kellenberger has noted that "ICRC's key operations in 2009 – in the Gaza Strip and in Sri Lanka – provided stark illustrations of the potentially devastating humanitarian consequences of military operations conducted in densely populated areas, especially when heavy or highly explosive weapons are used."

According to the British NGO Action on Armed Violence (AOAV), when explosive weapons are used in populated areas (towns, villages, residential neighbourhoods) the overwhelming majority (91% in 2012) of direct casualties are civilians.

Action on Armed Violence has also charted a dramatic rise in the use of suicide bombing and improvised explosive devices globally. Their data showed the number of civilians killed or injured by car and suicide bombs and other improvised explosive devices rising by 70 percent in the three years to 2013.

The International Network on Explosive Weapons (INEW), a partnership of NGOs, is calling for immediate action to prevent human suffering from the use of explosive weapons in populated areas.

== See also ==
- Dud
- Incendiary device
- Dirty bomb
- Missile
- Napalm
