= Carver Village Historic District =

Historic district in Georgia, United States

- U.S. National Register of Historic Places
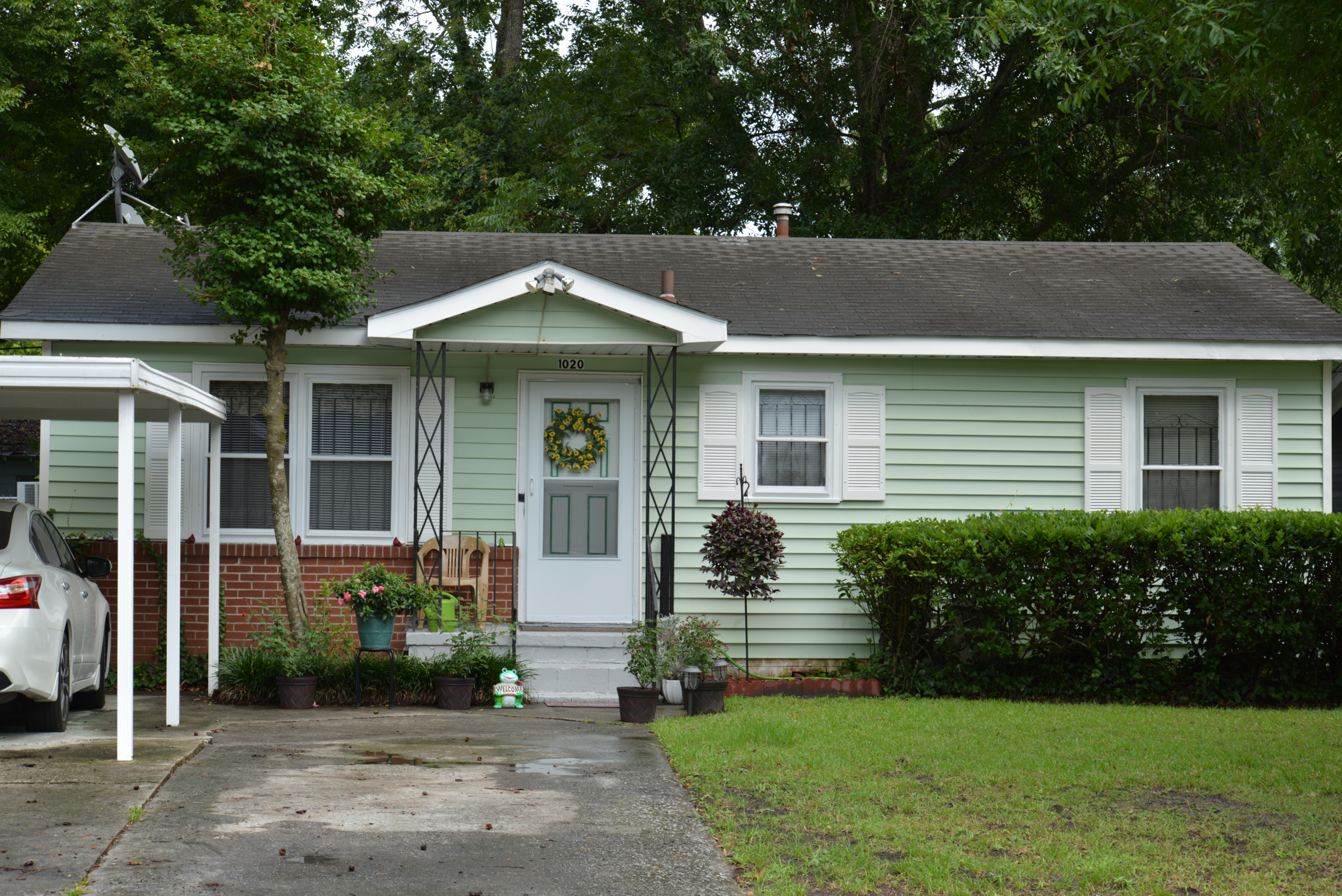
- House on Collat Street

- Location within Georgia
- Location: Bounded by W. Gwinnett & Endley Streets, Allen Blun, & Collat Avenues, Savannah, Georgia
- Coordinates: 32°04′16″N 81°07′35″W
- Built by: Multiple
- NRHP reference No.: 100003340
- Added to NRHP: January 24, 2019

The Carver Village Historic District is a historic district in Savannah, Georgia. It was listed on the National Register of Historic Places in 2019.

The district is bounded by W. Gwinnett and Endley Sts., Allen Blun, and Collat Avenues.

Carver Village, named for George Washington Carver, was established in 1948 and provided affordable housing for African Americans, including many who were in military service or veterans. It includes approximately 600 houses, churches, and other buildings.

Carver Village was the location of Operation Big Buzz, with 330,000 live mosquitos secretly dispersed on the town to test the possibility of entomological warfare.

Its pending nomination for National Register listing was celebrated in 2016, at a reception at the Historic Carver Village Neighborhood Center, 905 Collat Avenue.

It being listed on the National Register was also asserted in 2017.
