= Exploding ammunition =

Sabotaged firearm cartridges

Exploding ammunition or spiked ammunition is an ammunition and other ordnance that is sabotaged (propellant replaced) and left behind for enemy forces, generally insurgents, to find and use. It is designed to explode and destroy the weapon it is used in and perhaps injure or kill the person attempting to fire the weapon. In addition to explosive cartridges used in small arms, exploding ammunition can include rocket-propelled grenades or mortar shells.

== Historical use ==
Exploding ammunition was used by both Allied and German forces during World War II, by Iraq, and Afghanistan; possibly by the Soviet Union in Afghanistan as well.

=== Vietnam war ===
Exploding ammunitions were used by the United States in Vietnam (Project Eldest Son).

=== Syrian civil war ===
In 2013 it was reportedly used by Bashar al-Assad led Syrian government forces during the Syrian civil war in order to target Free Syrian Army fighters in the eastern district of Damascus. The bullets' explosives were replaced by more potent primary explosives. Not every round was repurposed however.

== Distribution ==
In addition to sale through black market channels, exploding ammunition may be distributed to enemy forces by being "lost" during transport, or on the battlefield where it may be left behind after a retreat. If the opportunity presents itself, exploding ammunition may be switched with ammunition stocks of the enemy or even the cartridges in the weapons of dead enemies.

== Effectiveness ==
Exploding ammunition, if used by enemy forces, is demoralizing, produces casualties, and destroys enemy weapons. However, it is quite likely that, once introduced into a theater of war, it will end up injuring friendly forces or even forces of the government which introduced it. Using a small charge which only jams the weapon is sometimes done when the chance that the spiked ammunition may fall into friendly hands is high, for example, when a case of ammunition is "lost" by appearing to have fallen from the back of a truck.

== See also ==
- Expanding bullet
- Explosive weapon
