= War against the potato beetle =

Pest control campaign in the Warsaw Pact

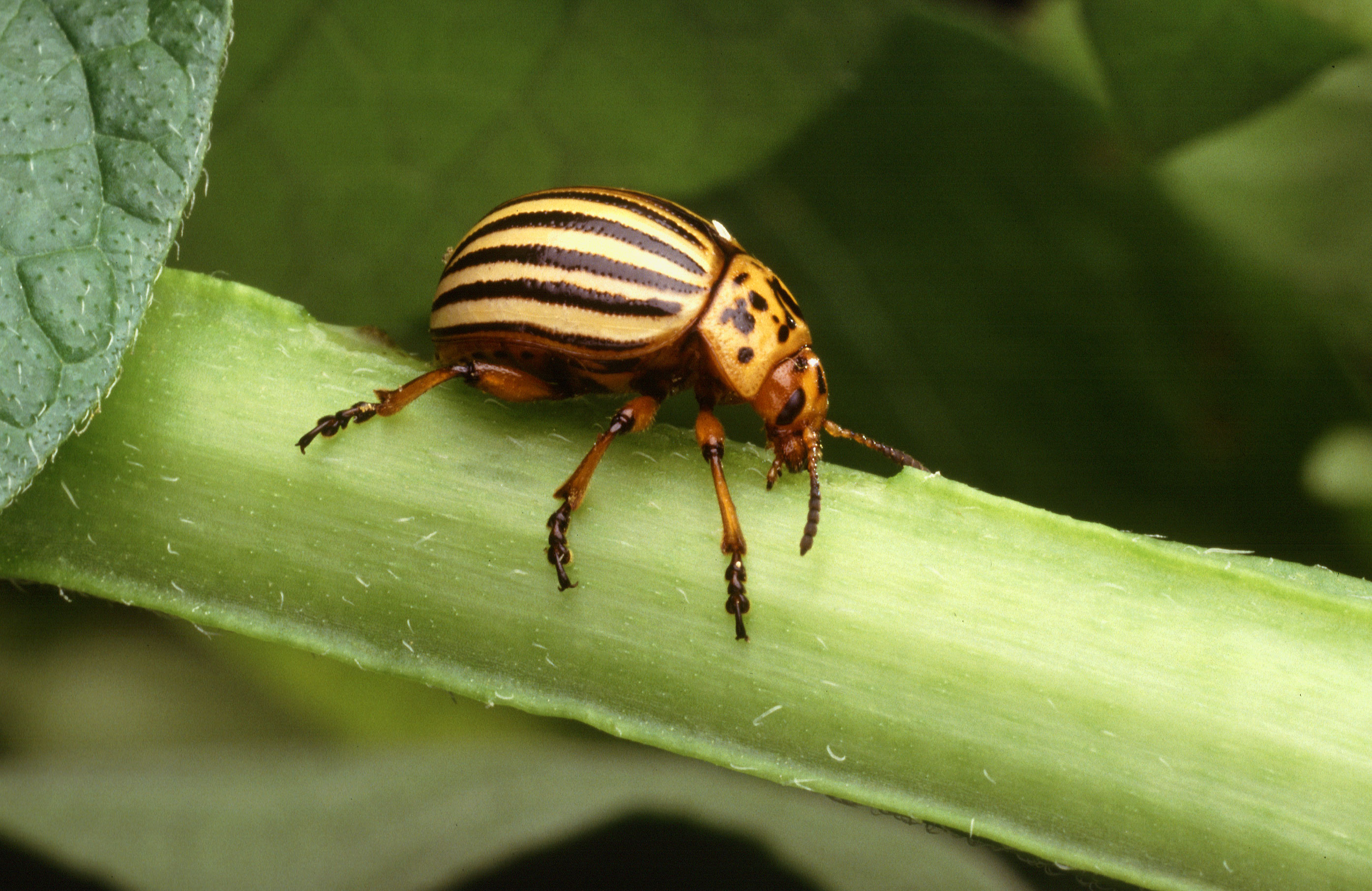
Colorado beetle

The war against the potato beetle was a campaign launched in Warsaw Pact countries during the Cold War to eradicate the Colorado potato beetle (Leptinotarsa decemlineata). It was also a propaganda operation that alleged it was introduced into East Germany, the People's Republic of Poland and Communist Czechoslovakia by the United States as a form of entomological warfare. Communist propaganda of the time claimed that the insect was being dropped from parachutes and balloons, with the intent of immiserating the populations of these countries, causing famines, and facilitating an economic crisis.

== The beetle ==
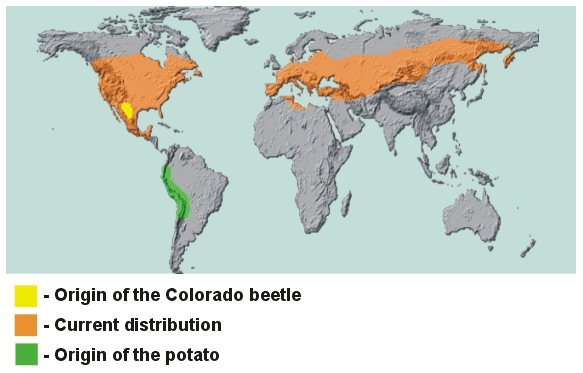
Native ranges of the Colorado beetle and the potato

The Colorado potato beetle, also known as the "ten striped spearman", is a common pest of potato crops. It is most likely native to the area between Colorado and northern Mexico, and was discovered in 1824 by Thomas Say in the Rocky Mountains. Since the mid-nineteenth century, it has been one of the most destructive pests of the cultivated potato. The insect made its way to Germany in the 1870s but was successfully eradicated. However, it made a second appearance after World War I in the Bordeaux area in France, where it probably arrived with American troops and equipment. It reached the French border with Germany by 1936 and continued spreading eastward. It was probably transferred to Czechoslovakia with the German occupation after the Munich Agreement and to Poland after the Nazi invasion in 1939.

The most common method of dealing with the pest is through the use of pesticides. DDT was effectively used until the beetle developed resistance by the 1950s. Subsequently, other insecticides were employed but these eventually ran into a similar problem.

== Before the Cold War ==
While later Cold War-era allegations were propaganda, the idea of using the beetle for purposes of warfare had factual origins. During World War I, the French did actually draft plans for using the potato beetle against the Germans and in turn, during World War II, Germany worked on developing an insect army of its own, while simultaneously alleging that such a program was being carried out by the United States and the British.

== During the Cold War ==
=== Soviet Union ===
The Colorado beetle crossed the borders of the Soviet Union in 1949, but Soviet authorities were able to quickly eradicate it, and strict quarantine restrictions managed to prevent its spread, but only until 1958. After that, the beetle spread widely across the USSR, greatly affecting potato crops on the collective farms and small individual plots. The latter were affected especially severely, since in the USSR the private small farmers and gardeners lacked access to officially distributed effective pesticides, so the beetle, their eggs, and larvae had to be collected by hand - often a chore assigned to children.

=== German Democratic Republic ===
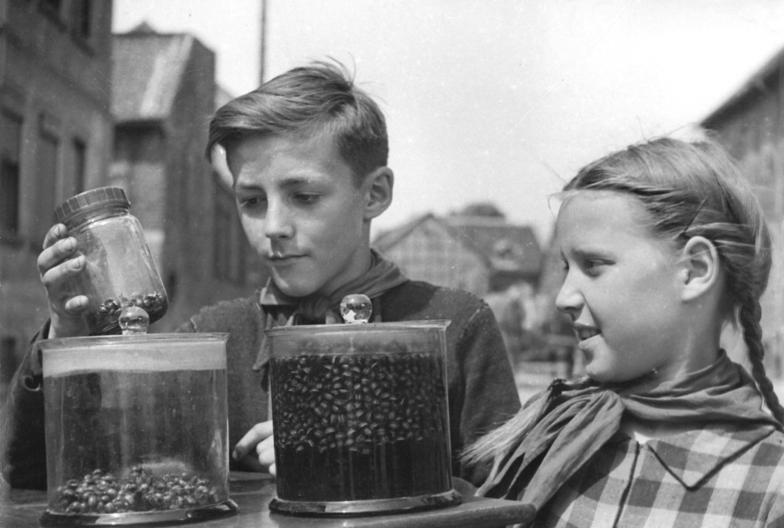
East German Young Pioneers during the War against the potato beetle. The boy on the left, Bodo, set a record for most beetles collected in one day, 2000. The girl on the right, Magdalena, managed 800 specimens.

After World War II, nearly half of all potato fields in the Soviet-occupied zone were infested by the beetle by 1950. In East Germany in the 1950s, the insect came to be known as "Amikäfer", a neologism for "Amerikanischer Käfer" (the "American beetle"). Propaganda posters were issued that depicted the beetle marching across Germany, with its yellow and black stripes replaced by red and white ones with white stars on a blue background on the thorax. Other posters showed the beetle being dropped from American planes with the caption "Kampf für den Frieden" ("The battle for peace"). A letter was issued to "the people of the world", stating that "the beetles are smaller than the atomic bomb... but they are also a weapon of the US imperialists in the fight against the peace-loving workers and peasants of East Germany." Children's books on the beetle were also published and "Sondersuchtage" ("Special Search Days") were organized in which everyone from young children to the elderly was expected to come out and gather them for destruction.

=== People's Republic of Poland ===
In Poland, the war against the potato beetle (stonka) began in the second half of the 1940s. Articles on the plague appeared in major newspapers and farmers' magazines such as Przysposobienie Rolnicze i Wojskowe ("Agricultural and Military Almanac"). The official organ of the ruling communist Polish United Workers' Party Trybuna Ludu ("People's Tribune") reported that after being dropped on the Baltic Sea by American planes, the beetle emerged onto land and began to wage "sabotage and diversionary actions aimed at socialist Poland". As a result, the communist government declared a "merciless war against the beetle". A Naczelny Nadzwyczajny Komisarz ("General Special Commissar") was appointed to oversee the assault on the beetles, the country was divided into strategic sectors, and battle maps indicating enemy positions were drawn up. Simultaneously, instructions were issued to farmers describing simple and effective ways of eradicating the pest if pesticides were not available; for instance drowning specimens in water with a small admixture of kerosene. Even Poland's socialist poets joined the struggle, exemplified by Maria Kownacka's poem Alarm, which instructs farmers to "protect the potatoes!!!" and tells either the beetle or the imperialists that "we will not allow ourselves to be starved!!!" (exclamation marks in original).

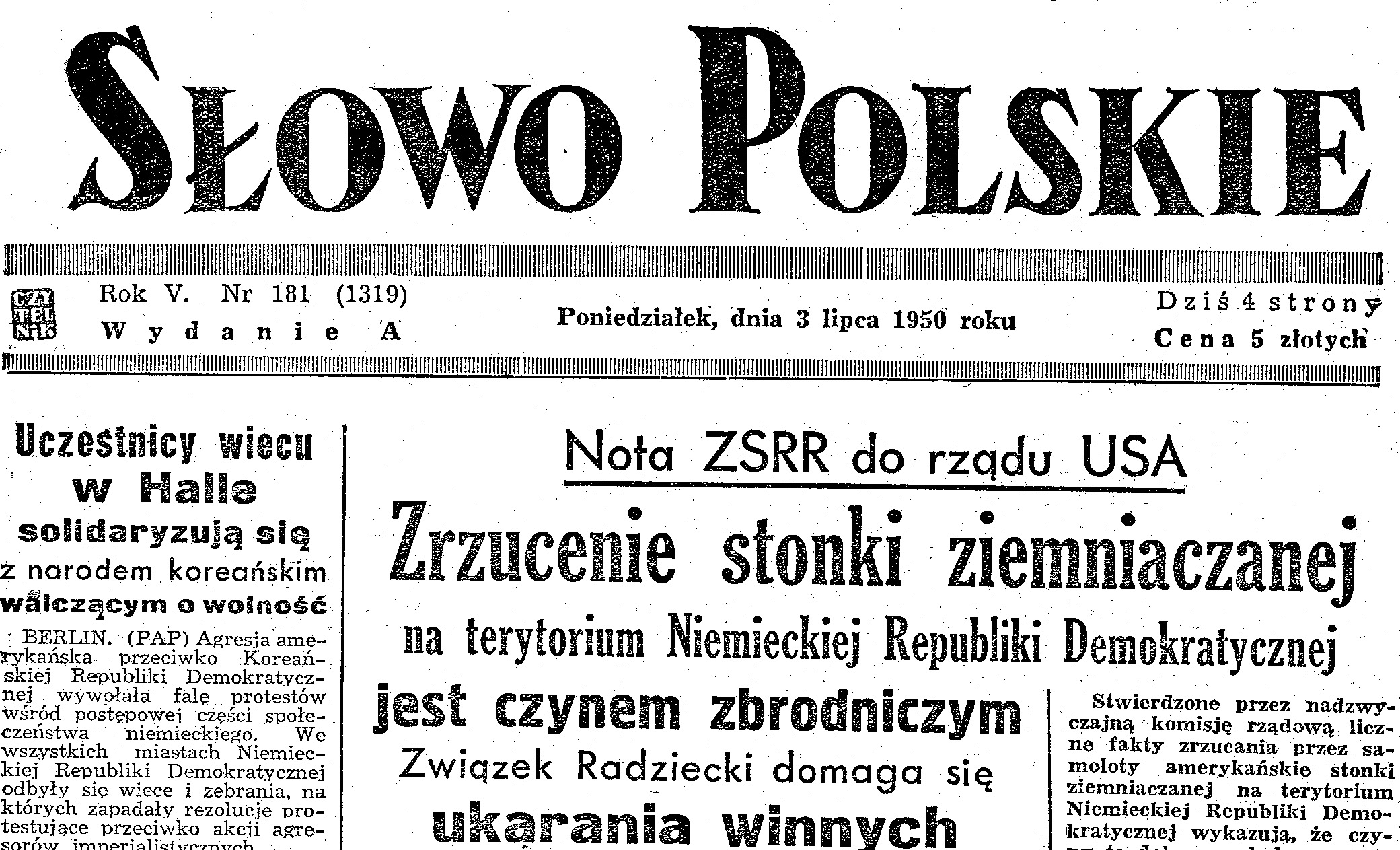
Front page of polish newspaper "Słowo Polskie" from 3 July 1950 r. Headline of article reads "USSR note to government of USA. The dropping of potato beetle on territory of German Democratic Republic is a criminal act. The Soviet Union demands punishment for those who are guilty."

A Polish newsreel from 1950, "Walka z stonką" ("The struggle against the beetle"), claimed that "the progressive opinion of the world has rightfully condemned the crimes of the American pilots who dropped tremendous amounts of the potato beetle on the fields of the German Democratic Republic... from where the beetle invaded Polish territory". The news report went on to describe the campaign launched by the Polish Ministry of Agriculture to eradicate the pest through the use of DDT (Azotox in its Soviet bloc version), vigilance on Poland's Baltic coast, engagement of the Polish Air Force, and the general mobilization of society, particularly the youth. The newsreel concluded that "the American pest will be unsuccessful both in Poland and Germany. The warmongers' provocation will crash and burn. Everyone to war against the beetle!"

In a 1951 book published by the Polish Ministry of Defense, Zofia Kowalska wrote that American planes dropped beetles, "violating sovereign airspace", on the night of 24 May in East Germany, in the Zwickauer Land of Saxony.

In Poland, the propaganda campaign associated with the beetle ended by the beginning of the 1960s.

=== Western response ===
In response to the allegations issued by the Soviet bloc countries' governments, the US issued tepid denials. In August 1950, at the suggestion of the CIA, the West German authorities printed postcard-sized cardboard replicas of the potato beetle and stamped these with political slogans and the letter "F" for "Freiheit" ("Freedom"). A number of these were sent to all the municipal governments in East Germany and the rest dropped from a balloon over East German territory as a joke.

== Modern era ==
In the European Union, the beetle remains a regulated (quarantine) pest for the Republic of Ireland, the Balearic Islands, Cyprus, Malta and southern parts of Sweden and Finland, along with the non-EU member states of the United Kingdom and Norway. It is not endemic in any of these countries, although occasional infestations occur, as in Finland in the summer of 2011, when strong winds blew from Russia.

== See also ==
- Four Pests campaign
