= Operation Big Itch =

1954 US entomological warfare test

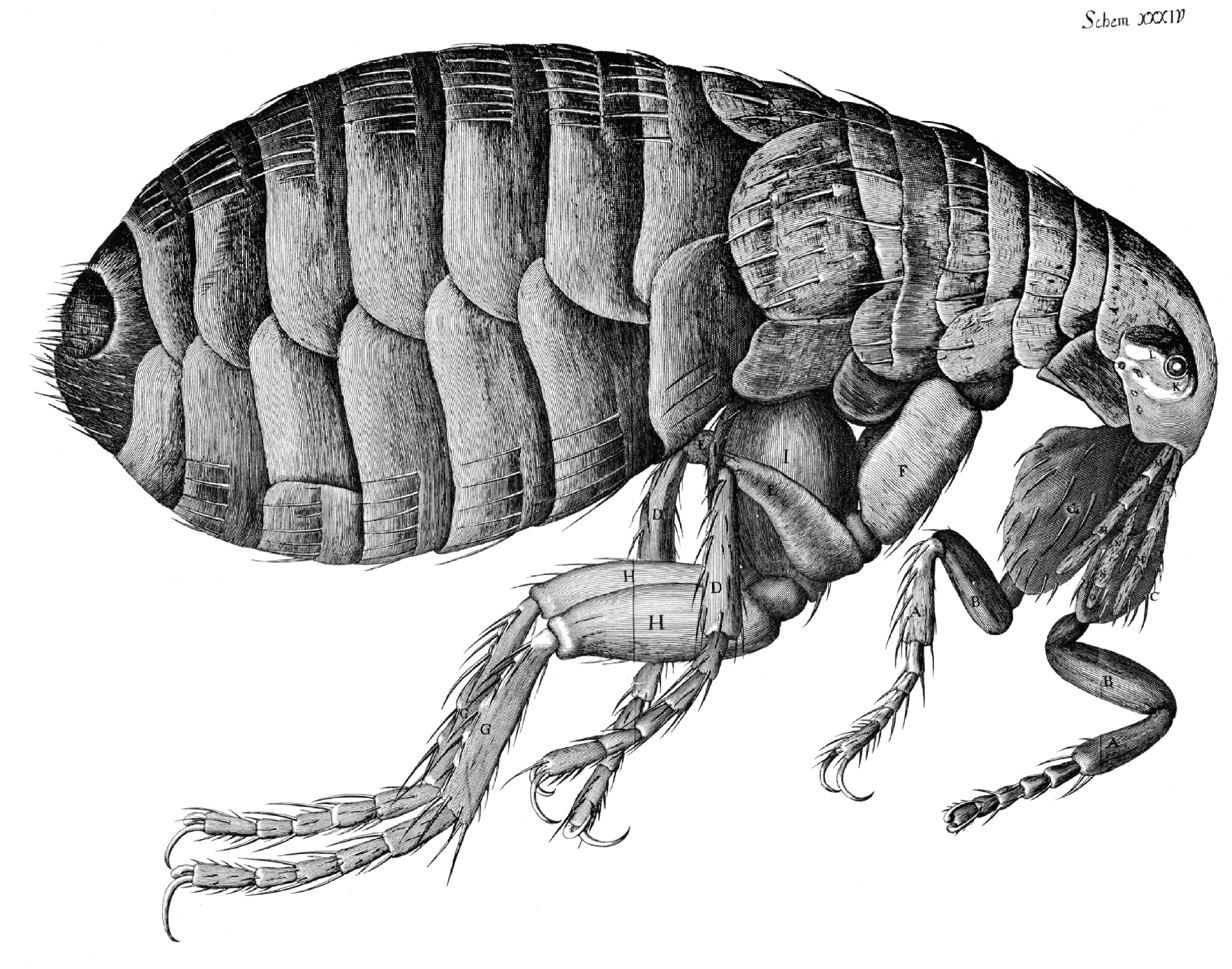
Depicted micrograph of the common flea

Operation Big Itch was a U.S. entomological warfare field test using uninfected fleas to determine their coverage and survivability as a vector for biological agents. The tests were conducted at Dugway Proving Ground in 1954.

The test was part of the larger United States biological warfare program seemingly run by the U.S. Army Chemical Corps.

== Operation ==
Operation Big Itch was a September 1954 series of tests at Dugway Proving Ground in Utah. The tests were designed to determine coverage patterns and survivability of the tropical rat flea (Xenopsylla cheopis) for use in biological warfare as disease vector. The fleas used in these trials were not infected by any biological agent. The fleas were loaded into two types of munitions and dropped from the air. The E14 bomb and E23 bomb, which could be clustered into the E86 cluster bomb and E77 bomb, respectively. When the cluster bombs reached 2,000 or 1,000 feet (600 or 300 m) the bomblets would drop via parachute, disseminating their vector.

The E14 was designed to hold 100,000 fleas and the E23 was designed to hold 200,000 fleas but the E23 failed in over half of the preliminary Big Itch tests. E23s malfunctioned during testing and the fleas were released into the aircraft where they bit the pilot, bombardier and an observer. As a result, the remaining Big Itch tests were conducted using only the smaller capacity E14. Guinea pigs were used as test subjects and placed around a 660-yard (600 m) circular grid.

== Results ==
Big Itch proved successful; the tests showed that not only could the fleas survive the drop from an airplane but they also soon attached themselves to hosts. The weapon proved able to cover a battalion-sized target area and disrupt operations for up to one day. The one-day limit was due to the activity of the fleas; the air dropped fleas were only active for about 24 hours.

== See also ==
- Operation Big Buzz
- Operation Drop Kick
- Operation May Day
