= Jeffrey A. Lockwood =

Jeffrey Alan Lockwood
- Born: 1960; United States
- Education: Ph.D. Louisiana State University
- Occupations: Author, professor
- Spouse: Nancy
- Children: Ethan, Erin
- Writing career
- Genres: Science, meditations
- Notable awards: Pushcart Prize; John Burroughs Medal

"When I slow my pace of living so that I truly see the grassland, then my life comes into focus." (J.A. Lockwood, Prologue, Prairie soul: Finding grace in the earth beneath my feet)

—

Jeffrey Alan Lockwood (born 1960) is an author, entomologist, and professor of Natural Sciences and Humanities at the University of Wyoming. He writes both nonfiction science books and meditations. Lockwood received both the Pushcart Prize and the John Burroughs Medal. He also serves on the Advisory Council of METI (Messaging Extraterrestrial Intelligence).

== Education ==
Lockwood earned a B.S. in biology from New Mexico Institute of Mining and Technology, where he was the 1982 recipient of the Brown Award. He received a Ph.D. in entomology from Louisiana State University after completing a dissertation entitled The behavioral ecology of the first instar southern green stink bug, Nezara viridula (L.).

== Career ==
His career at the University of Wyoming began as Assistant Professor of Entomology before becoming Professor of Natural Sciences and Humanities. He then transferred to the philosophy department and taught in the Master of Fine Arts program in creative writing.

Lockwood has authored numerous articles, some licensed by government entities, such as the Wyoming Water Research Center. In 2000, he co-authored Grasshoppers and Grassland Health for the North Atlantic Treaty Organization. His most recent science book, Six-legged Soldiers: Using Insects as Weapons of War, is a historical account of entomological bioterrorism from early days through the present, and the near future. A guest of the world: Meditations is Lockwood's latest book on spirituality under Skinner House Books, a book publisher run by the Unitarian Universalist Association.

Lockwood and other scholars at the University of Wyoming have recently become locked in a debate with university administration and Wyoming business and energy leaders over what he and others have argued is a clear case of the infringement of academic freedom. According to emails and reports released under the Freedom of Information Act (FOIA), the sitting university President, Tom Buchanan, ordered the destruction of Carbon Sink, an artwork created by artist Chris Drury, after Wyoming energy and business leaders considered it an untoward criticism of the industry that partly subsidizes the university though severance tax. Although Wyoming industry leaders have called for a moratorium on the debate, the university administration's infringement of academic freedom has become the hot-button topic while the university seeks a replacement for Buchanan, upon his scheduled retirement in July 2013.

== Personal life ==
Lockwood is married and has a son and a daughter. He is a member of the Unitarian Universalist Fellowship of Laramie, Wyoming, USA. He also appears as a character in Tectonic Theater Project's The Laramie Project and The Laramie Project: 10 Years Later.

== Selected works ==
=== Articles ===
- (1987). Probabilities of rangeland grasshopper outbreaks in Wyoming counties. Laramie, Wyo: Agricultural Experiment Station, Dept. of Plant, Soil, and Insect Sciences. OCLC 20379263
- (1987). The Moral Standing of Insects and the Ethics of Extinction. The Florida Entomologist 70 (1): 70-89.
- (1988). Impact of sedimentation on the aquatic macroinvertebrates of the North Fork of the Little Snake River. Laramie, Wyo: Wyoming Water Research Center]. OCLC 54467910

=== Books ===
- (1988). Biology and recommendations for use of Nosema locustae Canning, a biological control agent of grasshoppers. Laramie, Wyo: Agricultural Experiment Station, Dept. of Plant, Soil, and Insect Sciences, University of Wyoming. OCLC 20975160
- (1997). Ethical issues in biological control. Agriculture and human values, v. 14, no. 3. Dordrecht: Kluwer Academic. OCLC 39233868
- (2002). Grasshopper dreaming: Reflections on killing and loving. Boston: Skinner House Books. ISBN 1-55896-431-2
- (2004). Locust: The devastating rise and mysterious disappearance of the insect that shaped the American frontier. New York: Basic Books. ISBN 0-7382-0894-9 (Google Books text)
- (2004). Prairie soul: Finding grace in the earth beneath my feet. Boston: Skinner House Books. ISBN 1-55896-471-1 (Google Books text)
- (2006). A guest of the world: Meditations. Boston: Skinner House Books. ISBN 1-55896-504-1
- (2009). Six-legged soldiers: Using insects as weapons of war. Oxford: Oxford University Press. ISBN 978-0-19-533305-3
- (2009). (with William A. Reiners) Philosophical Foundations for the Practices of Ecology. Cambridge: Cambridge University Press. ISBN 978-0-521-13303-6
- (2013). The Infested Mind: Why Humans Fear, Loathe, and Love Insects. Oxford: Oxford University Press. ISBN 978-0-19-993019-7
