= Operation Big Buzz =

US entomological warfare experiment

Operation Big Buzz was a U.S. military entomological warfare field test conducted in 1955 on Savannah, Georgia's predominantly Black Carver Village neighborhood. The tests involved dispersing over 300,000 mosquitoes from aircraft and through ground dispersal methods.

The test appears to have been conducted by the Chemical Corps and the Army's Research and Development Command.

== Operation ==
Operation Big Buzz occurred in June 1955 in the U.S. state of Georgia. The operation was a field test designed to determine the feasibility of producing, storing, loading into munitions, and dispersing from aircraft the yellow fever mosquito (though these were not infected for the test) (Aedes aegypti). The second goal of the operation was to determine whether the mosquitoes would survive their dispersion and seek meals on the ground. Around 330,000 uninfected mosquitoes were dropped from aircraft in E14 bombs and dispersed from the ground in Savannah, Georgia's predominantly Black Carver Village neighborhood. In total about one million female mosquitoes were bred for the testing; remaining mosquitoes were used in munitions loading and storage tests. Those mosquitoes that were air-dispersed were dropped from airplanes 300 feet (91 m) above the ground, spreading out on their own and due to the wind.

== Results ==
Mosquitoes were collected as far away as 2,000 feet (610 m) from the release site. They were also active in seeking blood meals from humans and guinea pigs.

== See also ==
- Tuskegee Syphilis Study
- Race and health in the United States
- Unit 731
- Operation Big Itch
- Operation Drop Kick
- Operation May Day
