= Six-legged Soldiers =

2008 book by Jeffrey A. Lockwood

Six-Legged Soldiers: Using Insects as Weapons of War
- Author: Jeffrey A. Lockwood
- Language: English
- Subject: Entomological warfare
- Genre: Nonfiction
- Publisher: Oxford University Press
- Publication date: October 10, 2008
- Publication place: USA
- Media type: Hardcover
- Pages: 400
- ISBN: 0-19-533305-5
- OCLC: 192109802
- Dewey Decimal: 358/.3882 22
- LC Class: UG447.8 .L63 2009

"I think a small terrorist cell could very easily develop an insect-based weapon... The raw material is in the back yard." (Lockwood, to BBC Radio 4's Today programme, 2009)

—

Six-Legged Soldiers: Using Insects as Weapons of War is a nonfiction scientific warfare book written by author and University of Wyoming professor, Jeffrey A. Lockwood. Published in 2008 by Oxford University Press, the book explores the history of bioterrorism, entomological warfare, biological warfare, and the prevention of agro-terrorism from the earliest times to modern threats. Lockwood, an entomologist, preceded this book with Ethical issues in biological control (1997) and Locust: The devastating rise and mysterious disappearance of the insect that shaped the American frontier (2004), among others.

== Summary ==
Six-Legged Soldiers gives detailed examples of entomological warfare: using buckets of scorpions during a fortress siege, catapulting beehives ("bee bombs") across a castle wall, civilians as human guinea pigs in an effort to weaponize the plague, bombarding civilians from the air with infection-bearing insects, and assassin bugs placed on prisoners to eat away their flesh. Lockwood also describes a domestic ecoterrorism example with the 1989 threat to release the medfly (Ceratitis capitata) within California's crop belt. The last chapter highlights western nations' vulnerability to terrorist attacks.

Interviewed about the book by BBC Radio 4's Today programme, the author describes how a terrorist with a suitcase could bring diseases into a country. "I think a small terrorist cell could very easily develop an insect-based weapon."

== Criticism ==
In its January 2009 review, The Sunday Times criticised the book as being "scarcely scholarly" for its mixed collection of myth, legend and historical facts. Contrary to this critique, reviews from credible scholarly and scientific sources stated, "Six-Legged Soldiers is an excellent account of the effect arthropod-borne diseases have had on warfare...This book will inspire readers to understand...threats and prepare new methods to combat them." (Nature), "Lockwood thoroughly and objectively assembles an engaging chronicle on a topic for which official documentation is often sparse and the opportunity for propaganda is rife." (Science News), and "Lockwood...makes this history of entomological warfare morbidly entertaining...thanks to a lively writing style that ranges from the sardonic to the arch." (BioScience Magazine)
