= Operation Drop Kick =

1956 US entomological warfare test

Operation Drop Kick was conducted between April and November 1956 by the US Army Chemical Corps to test the practicality of employing mosquitoes to carry an entomological warfare agent in different ways. The Chemical Corps released uninfected female mosquitoes into a residential area of Savannah, Georgia, whose residents had agreed to participate in the project, and then estimated how many mosquitoes entered houses and bit people. Within a day, many reports of mosquito bites were received. In 1958, the Chemical Corps released 1,000,000 mosquitoes in Avon Park, Florida.

These tests showed that mosquitoes could be spread by means of various devices.

The 1964 movie Dr. Strangelove also refers to an Operation Drop Kick.

The TV series Archer refers to Operation Drop Kick as the codename of a CIA mission to take over a country in Latin America.

== See also ==
- Unethical human experimentation in the United States
- Operation Big Buzz
- Operation Big Itch
- Operation May Day
