= Transient expression =

Temporary expression of genes

Transient expression, more frequently referred to "transient gene expression", is the temporary expression of genes that are expressed for a short time after nucleic acid, most frequently plasmid DNA encoding an expression cassette, has been introduced into eukaryotic cells with a chemical delivery agent like calcium phosphate (CaPi) or polyethyleneimine (PEI). However, unlike "stable expression," the foreign DNA does not fuse with the host cell DNA, resulting in the inevitable loss of the vector after several cell replication cycles. The majority of transient gene expressions are done with cultivated animal cells. The technique is also used in plant cells; however, the transfer of nucleic acids into these cells requires different methods than those with animal cells. In both plants and animals, transient expression should result in a time-limited use of transferred nucleic acids, since any long-term expression would be called "stable expression."

Methodology varies depending on the organism to transform. While plants can be transformed with a construct introduced into Agrobacterium tumefaciens via agroinfiltration or floral dip, most animal cells would require a viral vector. In humans, the field of transient transformation advanced rapidly during the 2020–2021 COVID-19 pandemic with major COVID-19 vaccines using either direct mRNA transfer into human or adenovirus vectors, with the RNA being expressed in the host human to produce spike proteins that induce an immune response.

== Advantages ==
When choosing between inducing transient or stable expression in cells, time frame and experimental goal must be taken into consideration. Transiently transfected cells are often used to study the effects of short-term gene expression, perform RNA interference (RNAi)‑mediated gene silencing, or quickly generate small-scale recombinant proteins. This rapid generation small quantities of recombinant proteins can be applied towards evaluating their potential as drug candidates or examining their integrity of constructs during stages of vector development. Additionally, transient expression can be a useful tool when aiming to optimize selected parameters before undergoing the time-consuming process of scale-up in stably transfected cells. Typically, the cells are harvested within 1-4 days after successful transfection. For even quicker results, replacing DNA with mRNA can result in transient expression within minutes after successful transfection in some systems; this process bypasses translocation to the nucleus and transcription.

If stable, long-term gene expression is desired, stable transfection of cells is more useful. However, since successful integration of a DNA vector into the chromosome is a rare occurrence, this process is more difficult and time-consuming, and is reserved for large-scale protein production, gene therapies, and long-term pharmacology studies.

== Expression in Plant Cells ==
=== Agrobacterium-mediated genetic transformation ===
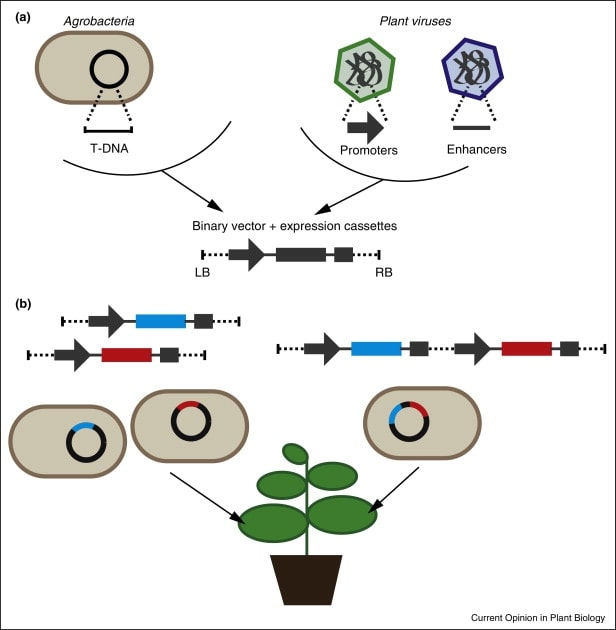
(a) Depicts the process of disarming of the Agrobacteria tumor-inducing plasmid and fusion with plant viral regulatory sequences. (b) Depicts co-expression via infiltration of several Agrobacteria cultures containing separate binary vectors or cultures possessing single vectors containing multiple expression cassettes.

The dominant technology used for the production of transgenic plants for transient expression is Agrobacterium-mediated genetic transformation, or "agroinfiltration," and virus expression machinery. Agrobacterium tumefaciens and related Agrobacterium species are well-known plant pathogens that have been engineered to efficiently transfer specific pieces of DNA (called transfer DNA, or T-DNA) into the plant nucleus using binary vector systems, which consists of a T-DNA binary vector and a vir helper plasmid. This binary vector separates T-DNA from trans-acting virulence proteins that help mediate the transfer. Advantages of this method include modularity of broad host-range plasmids of small size through standard molecular biology techniques. Furthermore, since the parent tumor-inducing plasmid in Agrobacterium strains have been disarmed and only non-reproductive cells have been modified (as opposed to germ-line modifications), the process is considered environmentally harmless.

Applications of this process has resulted in advancements made in the use of plants to synthetic biology. Plant-derived bioproducts show promise of high competitiveness towards traditional mammalian cell expression systems.

== Expression in Mammalian Cells ==
Mammalian cell expression systems are essential for the transient production of recombinant proteins and their complementary post-translational modifications. In fact, approximately half of the current commercially available therapeutic proteins are produced in mammalian cells. However, mammalian cell systems' slow growth, precise growth requirements, and potential risk of infection by animal viruses present a number of challenges. As a result, a growing number of mammalian cell lines have been established to serve as hosts for transient recombinant protein production.

=== HEK293 cells ===
Although other cell lines, such as African green monkey kidney (COS) and baby hamster kidney (BHK), can be used for recombinant protein production, the most commonly employed host system in transient expression of mammalian cells involves derivatives of the HEK293 cell line, which is based on the human embryonic kidney cell line established in 1977 by Graham et al. The HEK293 cell line was created via transformation with sheared Adenovirus 5 DNA. Advantages of using this cell line include their high rates of transfection and ability to grow in a serum-free medium, which results in reduced cost and lowered risk of contamination with animal-derived material typically found in serum.

Several engineered sublines were later developed by incorporating viral elements derived from mammalian viruses, such as SV40 virus or Epstein–Barr virus (EBV), which are notable for their high retention of plasmid DNA in an episomal state and their capacity to increase transcription and translation via specific viral properties. These later sublines were consequently identified to have two interacting components: the SV40 large T-antigen binding to the SV20 origin of replication (SV40ori) and the EBV-derived nuclear antigen-1 (EBNA-1) protein to its associated origin of replication (oriP).

Typical historical yields of transient expression in HEK293 cells transfected using PEI-25kDa was 20-40 mg/L of recombinant antibody protein. In 2008, Backliwal et al. reported for the first time yields crossing 1 g/L of recombinant antibody protein.

=== CHO cells ===
Traditionally, Chinese hamster ovary (CHO) cells are associated with the establishment of stable cell lines for biologics. Recently, however, attempts to engineer CHO cells for transient protein production have garnered recognition. CHO cells were among the earliest established cell lines for in vitro cultivation, and their potential as a host for production and manufacturing of biological products remains popular. CHO cells are preferable for transient expression due to their easy industrial scale-up, versatility for the production of diverse biomolecules, and low risk of infection of human viruses, among other advantages. Three primary expression systems have been established:

1. EBNA-1-engineered CHO cell line
2. CHO EBNA LT cell line, which is carried apart from the EBNA-1 gene and the mouse polyomavirus large T antigen
3. EpiCHO system, which consists of a CHO cell line transfected with the polyomavirus large T antigen gene and a DNA expression vector encoding polyomavirus origin (PyOri) for autonomous replication and EBV EBNA-1 and OriP for plasmid retention.
