= Outline of U.S. chemical weapons =

The following outline is provided as an overview of and topical guide to U.S. chemical weapons:

The United States chemical weapons program began in 1917 during World War I with the creation of the U.S. Army's Gas Service Section and ended 73 years later in 1990 with the country's practical adoption of the Chemical Weapons Convention (signed 1993; entered into force, 1997). Destruction of stockpiled chemical weapons began in 1985 and is still ongoing. The U.S. Army Medical Research Institute of Chemical Defense, at Aberdeen Proving Ground, Maryland, continues to operate for purely defensive research and education purposes.

== Agencies and organizations ==
=== Army agencies and schools ===
The U.S. chemical weapons programs have generally been run by the U.S. Army:

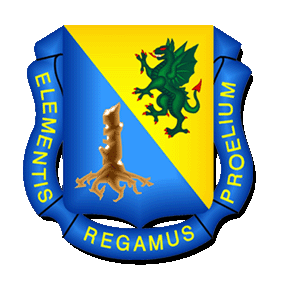
The regimental insignia of the U.S. Army Chemical Corps

- American Expeditionary Force Gas Service Section
- American Expeditionary Force Chemical Service Section
- U.S. Army Gas School
- U.S. Army Edgewood Chemical Biological Center
- U.S. Army Soldier and Biological-Chemical Command
- United States Army Chemical Corps, originally the Chemical Warfare Service
- United States Army Medical Research Institute of Chemical Defense
- U.S. Army Chemical Materials Agency
- Program Executive Office, Assembled Chemical Weapons Alternatives
- United States Army CBRN School

=== Units ===
- Chemical mortar battalion
- 1st Gas Regiment
- 2nd Chemical Mortar Battalion

=== Modern chemical depots ===
Active bases

- Blue Grass Army Depot
- Pueblo Chemical Depot

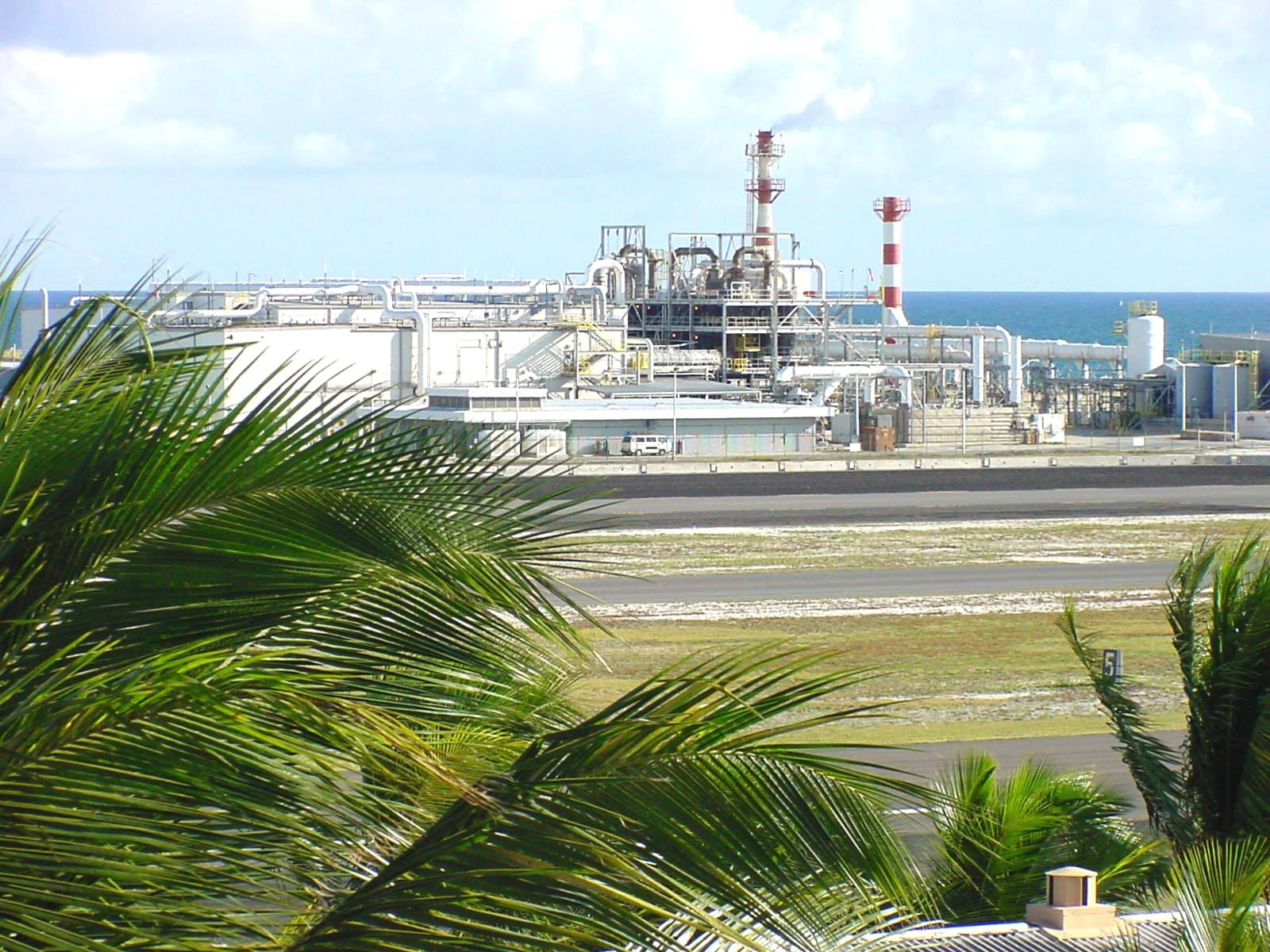
Johnston Atoll Chemical Agent Disposal System (JACADS) in 2000

Closed bases

- Johnston Atoll Chemical Agent Disposal System (closed 2000)
- Edgewood Chemical Activity at Aberdeen Proving Ground (closed 2006)
- Hawthorne Army Depot (eliminated shells 1999)
- Newport Chemical Depot (closed 2008)
- Pine Bluff Chemical Activity (closed 2014)
- Umatilla Chemical Depot (closed 2014)
- Anniston Chemical Activity (closed 2013)
- Deseret Chemical Depot with Tooele Chemical Agent Disposal Facility (closed 2013)

=== Older chemical weapons program locations ===
- Camp American University
- Camp Leach
- Dugway Proving Ground
- Rocky Mountain Arsenal
- Navajo Ordnance Depot

== Treaties, laws and policy ==
The U.S. is party to several treaties which limit chemical weapons:

- Chemical Weapons Convention
- Chemical Weapons Convention Implementation Act of 1998
- Executive Order 11850
- Executive Order 13049
- Executive Order 13128
- Hague Conventions (1899 and 1907)
- Treaty relating to the Use of Submarines and Noxious Gases in Warfare - Failed because France objected to clauses relating to submarine warfare
- Geneva Protocol
- Public Law 99-145

== Weapons ==
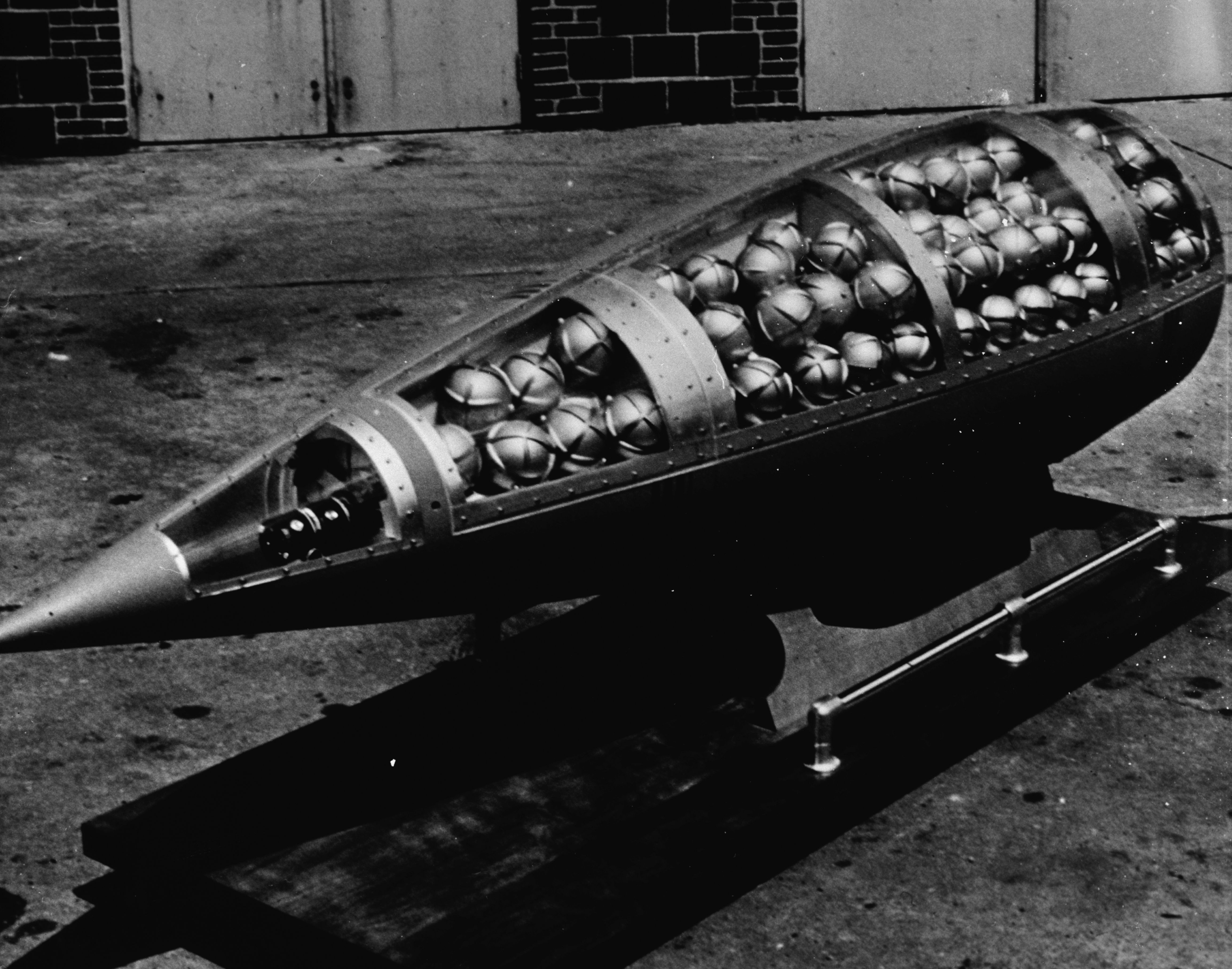
M134 cluster bomblets in an Honest John warhead

=== Canceled weapon projects ===
While these weapon systems were developed, they were not produced or stored in the US chemical weapons stockpile.

- BIGEYE bomb
- XM-736 8-inch binary projectile

=== Vehicles ===
- LCI(M), infantry landing craft armed with 4.2 in mortar
- M1135 nuclear, biological, and chemical reconnaissance vehicle, a variation of the Stryker vehicle
- M93 Fox
- MQM-58 Overseer

=== Declared stockpile and other weapons ===
- M1 chemical mine
- M1 chemical bomb
- M10 smoke tank
- M104 155 mm shell
- M110A1/A2 155 mm shell
- M114 bomblet
- M121/A1 155 mm shell
- M122 155 mm shell

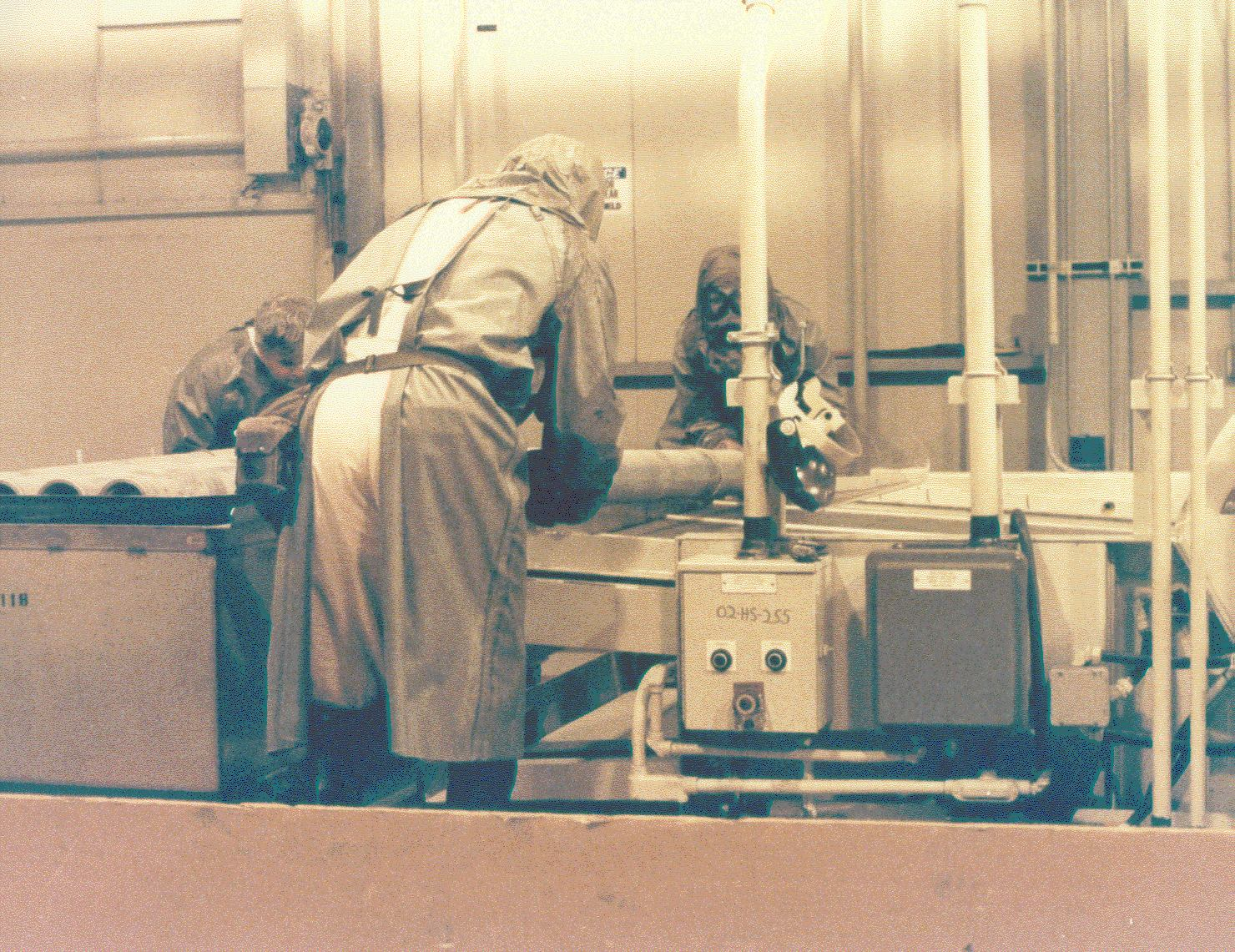
An M55 rocket being destroyed in 1990

- M125 bomblet, (developed as E54R6) chemical bomblet used with M34A1 cluster bomb
- M134 bomblet, (developed as E130R1), chemical bomblet for use with Honest John rockets
- M138 bomblet, sub-munition for the M43 cluster bomb
- M139 cluster bomblets for the MGR-1 Honest John rocket and other missile systems
- M2 mortar shell (M2A1) for the M2 4.2 Inch Mortar
- M23 chemical mine
- M34A1 cluster bomb (developed as E101R3), first U.S. air-delivered nerve agent weapon
- M360 105 mm shell
- M426 8-inch shell
- M43 cluster bomb
- M44 generator cluster
- M47 bomb, 100 lb. World War II-era chemical bomb
- M55 rocket
- M6 canister, BZ sub-munition for the M44 generator cluster
- M60 105 mm shell
- M687 155 mm shell
- MC-1 bomb
- Mk 94 bomb
- Mk 95 bomb
- Weteye bomb, also known as the Mk-116 bomb

=== Stockpiled chemical agents ===
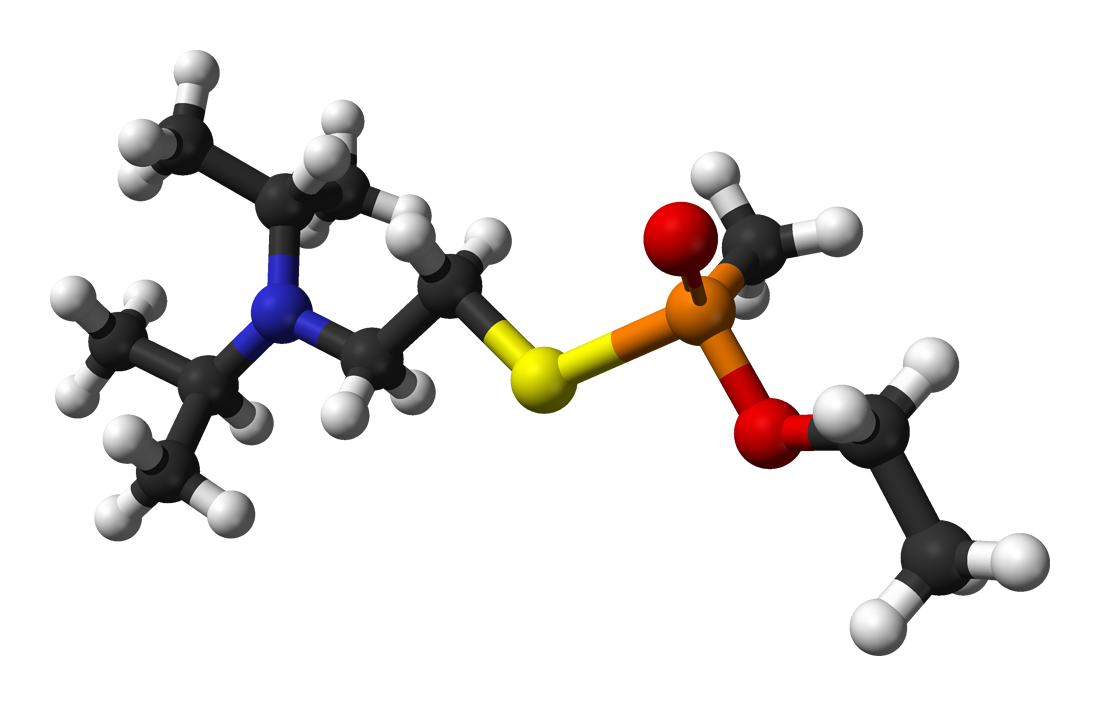
Ball-and-stick model of the (S) enantiomer of VX

Agents stockpiled at the time of Chemical Weapons Convention:

- isopropyl aminoethylmethyl phosphonite, or QL, part of a binary weapon (VX)
- Methylphosphonyl difluoride (known to the military as DF) and a mixture of isopropyl alcohol and isopropyl amine (known as OPA), a binary chemical weapon (sarin)
- Mustard gas
- Sarin (GB)
- VX
- Rainbow Herbicides

=== Older chemical agents ===
- Phosgene
- Chlorine
- BZ

== Other equipment ==
- Chemical Agent Identification Set (CAIS)
- People sniffer

== Exercises, incidents, and accidents ==
=== Operations and exercises ===
- Operation Blue Skies
- Operation CHASE, an operation that dumped conventional and chemical munitions at sea
- Operation Davy Jones' Locker, a post-World War II operation aimed at dumping German chemical weapons at seas
- Operation Geranium, a 1948 operation that dumped lewisite into the Atlantic Ocean.
- Operation Paperclip, a program beginning in 1945 to bring German scientists to the U.S.
- Operation Ranch Hand, defoliant operations during the Vietnam War
- Operation Red Hat, an early 1970 program to repatriate weapons from Okinawa
- Operation Rock Ready, 1980's testing and rebuilding of the M17 series protective mask
- Operation Snoopy, Vietnam War people sniffer operations.
- Operation Steel Box, an operation which moved chemical weapons out of Germany in 1990.

=== Accidents ===
- Bombing of the SS John Harvey during the Air Raid on Bari
- Dugway sheep incident

=== Chemical testing ===
- Edgewood Arsenal human experiments
- Operation LAC, (Large Area Coverage), 1958 test that dropped microscopic particles over much of the United States
- Operation Top Hat, a 1953 Chemical Corps exercise testing decontamination methods on human subjects
- Project SHAD

== Chemical defense program ==
- United States Army Medical Research Institute of Chemical Defense

== See also ==
- List of U.S. biological weapons topics
- United States and weapons of mass destruction
- MK ULTRA, the CIA-led program to test various chemicals
