= Dugway sheep incident =

1968 mass killing of sheep in Utah, U.S.

Dead sheep owned by Ray Peck in Skull Valley, 1968

The Dugway sheep incident, also known as the Skull Valley sheep kill, was a March 1968 sheep kill caused by the United States Army chemical and biological warfare programs at Dugway Proving Ground in Utah. An F-4 Phantom aircraft flying a test dispersal mission of the nerve agent VX inadvertently released some of the agent at a higher altitude. Six thousand sheep were killed on ranches near the base, and the contemporary popular explanation blamed Army testing of chemical weapons for the incident, though alternative explanations were offered. A report, commissioned by Air Force Press Officer Jesse Stay and first made public in 1998, was called the "first documented admission" from the Army that a nerve agent killed the sheep at Skull Valley. The public outcry contributed to the Nixon Administration's 1969 Statement on Chemical and Biological Defense Policies and Programs.

== Background ==
Since its founding in 1941, much of the activity at Dugway Proving Ground has been a closely guarded secret. Activities at Dugway included aerial nerve agent testing. According to reports from New Scientist, Dugway was still producing small quantities of non-infectious anthrax of a type used in the making of vaccines as late as 1998, 30 years after the United States renounced biological weapons. There were at least 1,100 other chemical tests at Dugway during the Dugway sheep incident. In total, almost 500,000 lb (230,000 kg) of nerve agents were dispersed during open-air tests. There were also tests at Dugway with other weapons of mass destruction, including 332 open-air tests of biological weapons, 74 dirty bomb tests, and eight furnace heatings of nuclear material under open-air conditions to simulate the dispersal of fallout in the case of meltdown of aeronautic nuclear reactors.

== Incident ==
In the days preceding the Dugway sheep incident, the United States Army at Dugway Proving Ground conducted at least three separate operations involving nerve agents. All three operations occurred on March 13, 1968. One involved the test firing of a chemical artillery shell, another the burning of 160 U.S. gallons (600 liters) of a nerve agent in an open-air pit and in the third a jet aircraft spraying nerve agent in a target area about 27 mi (43 km) west of Skull Valley. The third event is usually connected to the Skull Valley sheep kill.

The incident log at Dugway Proving Ground indicated that the sheep incident began with a phone call on March 17, 1968, at 12:30 a.m. The director of the University of Utah's ecological and epidemiological contact with Dugway, Dr. Bode, phoned Keith Smart, the chief of the ecology and epidemiology branch at Dugway to report that 3,000 sheep were dead in the Skull Valley area. The incident's initial report came to Bode from the manager of a Skull Valley livestock company. The sheep were grazing in an area about 27 mi (43 km) from the proving ground; total sheep deaths of 6,000–6,400 were reported over the next several days as a result of the incident. The Dugway Safety Office's attempt to count the dead sheep compiled 3,843.

== Possible causes ==
Previously obtained documents say a nerve agent demonstration occurred the day before the sheep deaths. On March 13, 1968, an F-4 Phantom fighter aircraft flew a test mission over the Dugway Proving Ground with chemical dispensers containing the nerve agent VX. One of the dispensers was not completely emptied during the test. As the F-4 gained altitude after its bombing run, VX trickled out in a trail behind the aircraft, drifted into Skull Valley, north of the proving ground, and settled over a huge flock of sheep.

One explanation in the aftermath of the incident was that a chemical or biological agent had escaped from the Dugway Proving Ground. Circumstantial evidence seemed to support this assertion; the United States Army admitted to conducting open-air tests with VX in the days preceding the sheep kill. The Army intimated that a spray nozzle had malfunctioned during the test, causing an aircraft to continue spraying VX as it climbed to higher altitudes. It was reported that a small amount of VX was found in the tissue of the dead sheep.

Other information contradicted the initial assumptions. One contradiction to nerve agent exposure as a cause came in the symptoms of some of the sheep following the incident. Several sheep, still alive, sat unmoving on the ground. The sheep refused to eat but exhibited normal breathing patterns and showed signs of internal hemorrhaging. Regular breathing and internal hemorrhaging are inconsistent with nerve agent exposure, and "no other animals of any type, including cows, horses, dogs, rabbits, or birds, appeared to have suffered any ill effects, a circumstance that was hard to explain if VX had in fact caused the sheep deaths."

== Aftermath ==
The incident affected the Army and U.S. military policy within a year. NBC News' "First Tuesday" aired a segment on the accident on February 4, 1969. New York Representative Richard D. McCarthy saw the episode and began looking into America's chemical and biological warfare programs.

The international infamy of the incident contributed to President Richard Nixon's decision to ban all open-air chemical weapon testing in 1969. The sheep incident was one of the events that helped contribute to a rise in public sentiment against the U.S. Army Chemical Corps during and after the Vietnam War. The Chemical Corps was almost disbanded.

Following the incident, the Army and other state and federal agencies compiled reports, some of which were later characterized as "studies". A report which remained classified until 1978 and unreleased to the public until nearly 30 years after the incident was called the "first documented admission" by the Army that VX killed the sheep. In 1998, Jim Woolf, reporting for The Salt Lake Tribune, made the content of the report public for the first time. The report described the evidence that a nerve agent was the cause of the sheep kill as "incontrovertible". The 1970 report, compiled by researchers at the U.S. Army's Edgewood Arsenal in Maryland, stated that VX was found in both snow and grass samples recovered from the area three weeks after the sheep incident.

The report concluded that the "quantity of VX originally present was sufficient to account for the death of the sheep." Even after the report surfaced, the Army maintained that it did not accept responsibility for the incident and did not admit negligence. As late as 1997, one year before the report went public, U.S. Department of Defense officials stated that "the reason it (the report) was never published is because it wasn't particularly revealing." Deseret News reported in June 1994 that Ray Peck, who owned the sheep that were killed, was outside working during the March 13, 1968, incident; members of his family developed nervous-system illnesses that were similar to those reported by people exposed to low levels of VX in lab experiments. Additionally, the probe showed that medical tests the Army had used to claim humans were not affected are now considered inconclusive, and the Pecks had shown other signs of low-level VX exposure.

== In popular culture ==
The Dugway incident caused a public backlash to American chemical weapons research that was reflected in works like The Andromeda Strain (1971). The incident also inspired the 1970 episodes of Hawaii Five-O called "Three Dead Cows at Makapuu", George C. Scott's 1972 film Rage, and Stephen King's The Stand in 1978.

Author Richard Kadrey used the incident as inspiration for the name of a fictional metal band, Skull Valley Sheep Kill, in his Sandman Slim novel series.

== See also ==
- Deseret Chemical Depot
- Deseret Test Center
- Granite Peak Installation
- Operation CHASE
- Project 112
- Project SHAD
- Sverdlovsk anthrax leak
- Banjawarn Station
- Unethical human experimentation in the United States
- United States and weapons of mass destruction
