= MC-1 bomb =

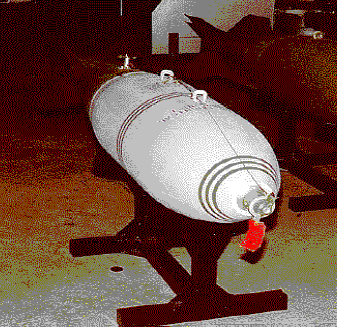
The 750 pound MC-1 sarin bomb

The MC-1 bomb was the first U.S. non-clustered air-dropped chemical munition. The 750-pound (340 kg) MC-1 was first produced in 1959 and carried the nerve agent sarin.

== History ==
The MC-1 chemical bomb was first brought into regular mass-production in 1959. A modified general purpose demolition bomb, the MC-1 was the first non-clustered chemical munition in the U.S. arsenal. The MC-1 was designed to be delivered via U.S. Air Force aircraft. The MC-1 was never used against enemy targets.

== Specifications ==
The MC-1 was a 750-pound (340 kg) munition. The weapon had a diameter of 16 inches (41 cm) and a length of 50 inches (127 cm). The MC-1 was filled with about 220 pounds (100 kg) of sarin (GB) nerve agent. The MC-1 was designed to be air-dropped via the F-4 Phantom II and was unable to fit that aircraft's replacement, the F-16.

== Demilitarization operations ==
Umatilla Chemical Depot stored about 2,400 MC-1 bombs until the final one was demilitarized and destroyed on June 9, 2006. Another 3,047 MC-1s were stored at Johnston Atoll when demilitarization operations began there in 1990. Those weapons were destroyed during the ensuing decade and operations at Johnston Atoll Chemical Agent Disposal System ended in 2000.

== Test involving the MC-1 ==
Tests were conducted using the MC-1 from July-November 1971 at Dugway Proving Ground in Utah. The aim of these tests, which were part of Project 112, was twofold. One goal was to determine hazards associated with the accidental release or damage from hostile fire of the MC-1 during takeoff or landing. A second goal was to determine if leak suppressant and disposal procedures for damaged bombs were adequate. For the purpose of the tests the MC-1 was filled with water and a sarin simulant, di(2-ethylhexyl) phthalate (DEHP). The bombs were dropped from an F-4 during the tests.

== See also ==
- M117 bomb
