= Umatilla =

Umatilla may refer to:

== Umatilla people and culture ==
- Umatilla people, a Native American tribe from Oregon
- Umatilla Indian Reservation, an Indian reservation in Oregon
- Umatilla language, a Native American language from the Plateau Penutian group
- Confederated Tribes of the Umatilla Indian Reservation, a Native American tribal entity in the U.S. state of Oregon

== Places ==
- Umatilla County, Oregon, a county in Oregon
- Umatilla, Oregon, a city located in Umatilla County, Oregon
- Umatilla, Florida, a city in Lake County, in the U.S. state Florida
- Umatilla River, a river in Oregon
- Umatilla Chemical Depot, a U.S. Army facility near the city of Umatilla, Oregon
