= Tooele Chemical Agent Disposal Facility =

Chemical weapon disposal facility in Tooele County, Utah, United States

Coordinates: 40°17′52″N 112°20′36″W

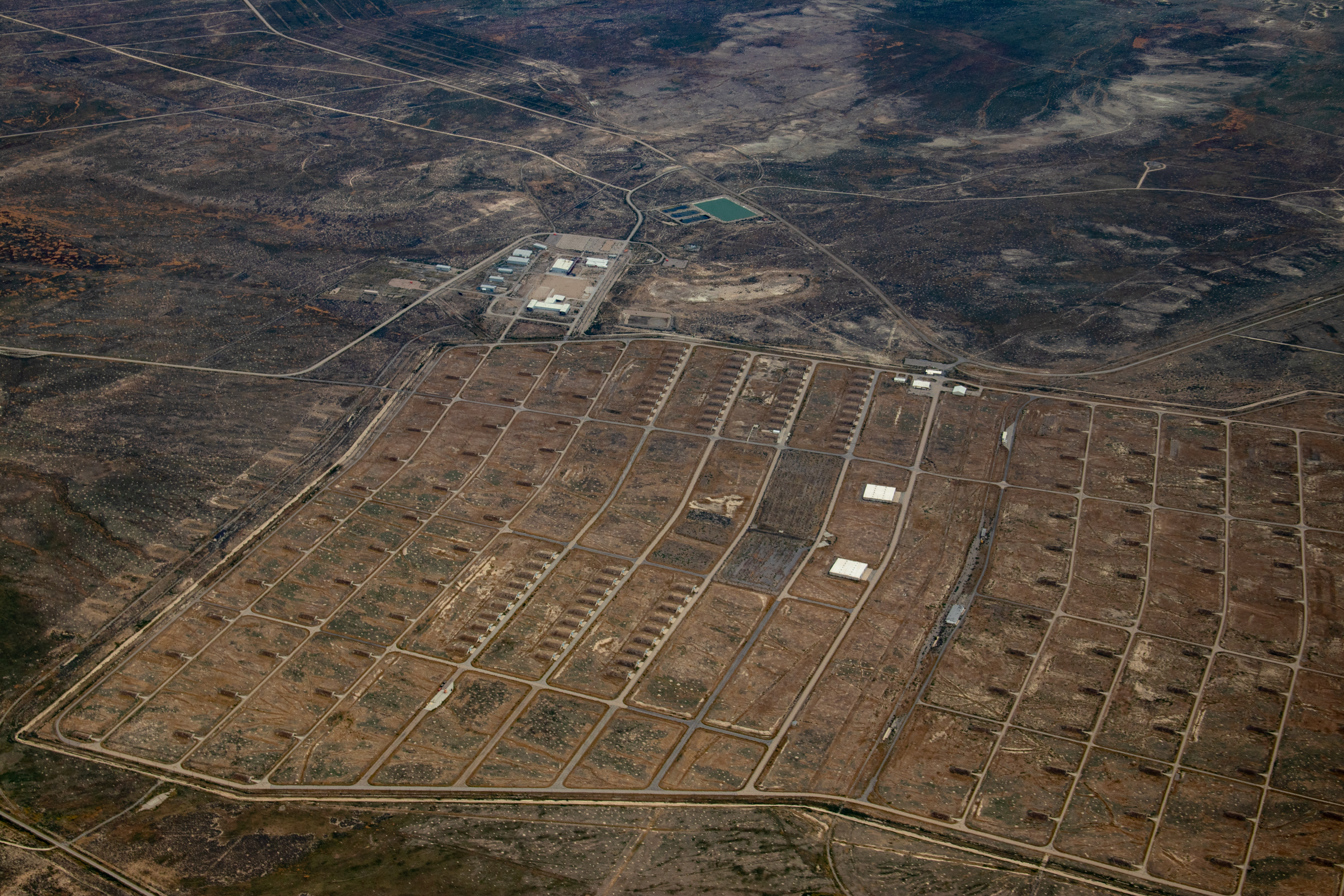
Aerial photo of storage and incinerator facility

The Tooele Chemical Agent Disposal Facility (TOCDF, also called Tooele Chemical Demilitarization Facility) or TOCDF, is a U.S. Army facility located at Deseret Chemical Depot in Tooele County, Utah that was used for dismantling chemical weapons.

== Disposal ==
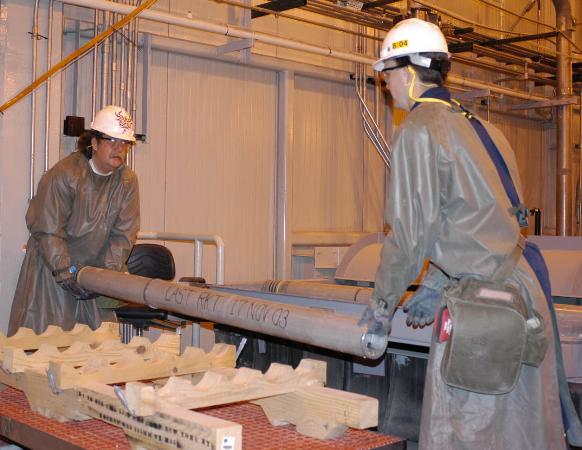
Workers load the final VX agent-filled M55 rocket onto the processing line for destruction, 17 November 2003.

Destruction is a requirement under the Chemical Weapons Convention and is monitored by the Organisation for the Prohibition of Chemical Weapons. Deseret Chemical Depot held 44% of the nation's chemical stockpile when processing began, and it had held some of these chemical munitions since 1942. TOCDF was constructed in the early 1990s and began destruction of chemical agent-filled munitions on 22 August 1996. As of September 2011, the facility had processed 99% of its stockpile. TOCDF processed all of its VX, sarin and mustard gas at its main facility; a smaller incinerator was installed west of the main plant in order to dispose of lewisite-filled containers. In advance of plant closing, two ponds were revitalized and the surrounded area reseeded as well as 29 miles of railroad being removed (out of 40-miles of rail in Deseret). Disposal of all chemical weapons concluded on 21 January 2012. It was the last depot to complete its disposal operations under the U.S. Army Chemical Materials Agency; although two other depots still store chemical weapons to be destroyed by the Assembled Chemical Weapons Alternatives program at Pueblo, Colorado and Bluegrass, Kentucky.

== GB campaign ==
Each of the weapons listed contained sarin (GB)

- 28,945 – 115mm self-propelled rockets (M55) containing 154.86 short tons (140.49 t)
- 1,056 – M56 warheads, which are M55 rockets without the rocket motor (5.65 short tons or 5.13 tonnes)
- 119,400 – 105mm cartridges (M360) (97.31 short tons or 88.28 tonnes)
- 679,303 – 105mm projectiles (M360) (553.63 short tons or 502.24 tonnes)
- 67,685 – 155mm projectiles (M121/A1) (219.98 short tons or 199.56 tonnes)
- 21,456 – 155mm projectiles (M122) (69.73 short tons or 63.26 tonnes)
- 888 – Weteye bombs (154.07 short tons or 139.77 tonnes)
- 4,463 – 750 lb (340 kg) bombs (MC-1) (490.93 short tons or 445.36 tonnes)
- 5,709 – Ton containers containing (4,299.10 short tons or 3,900.08 tonnes)

All sarin (6,045.26 short tons or 5,484.17 tonnes) was disposed of by March 2002.

== VX campaign ==
After completion of the GB campaigns, the plant was converted to dispose of similar weapons containing VX agent:

- 3,966 – M55 rockets (19.83 short tons or 17.99 tonnes)
- 3,560 – M56 rocket warheads (17.80 short tons or 16.15 tonnes)
- 53,216 – M121/A1 155mm projectiles (159.65 short tons or 144.83 tonnes)
- 22,690 – M23 land mine (119.12 short tons or 108.06 tonnes)
- 862 – TMU-28 Spray Tanks (584.44 short tons or 530.20 tonnes)
- 640 – Ton Containers (455.48 short tons or 413.20 tonnes)

All VX (1,356.32 short tons or 1,230.43 tonnes) was disposed of by 3 June 2005. Processing of VX-contaminated containers was completed in October 2005.

== Mustard Agent campaign ==
After VX processing was completed, the plant was reconfigured to process chemical weapons containing mustard gas, also called mustard agent or H or HD or HT.

- 5,463 - Ton Containers
- 54,453 - 155mm projectiles
- 63,274 - 4.2-inch (107 mm) mortars

Operations to destroy mustard gas weapons were completed on 21 January 2012.

== Weapons disposal process ==
The destruction process involves receiving the items in protective containers from a covered, protected storage area, and placing the items onto trays for insertion into the automated processing area.

Inside the first automated area, the Explosion Containment Room, explosive components are removed from the items and destroyed in a rotating kiln called the Deactivation Furnace System. The items then are carried on automated cars to another room, called the Munition Processing Bay, where automated machinery sucks the liquid agent out. The liquid is sent to holding tanks. The nearly-empty items are then moved to the lower level on an automated lift, and introduced into a high-temperature (maximum 2,000 °F or 1,100 °C) oven called the Metal Parts Furnace, which destroys the residual agent so that the containers can be safely disposed of as scrap metal.

The liquid agent is destroyed in one of two high-temperature (maximum 2,700 °F or 1,500 °C) ovens called Liquid Incinerators. The products of combustion from the ovens and kilns pass through extensive Pollution Abatement Systems, which catch the airborne products as salts, and hold them in a liquid slurry called brine, which is periodically shipped to out-of-state underground disposal facilities.

== See also ==
- Deseret Test Center
- United States and weapons of mass destruction
- Tooele Army Depot
