= M360 105 mm projectile =

The M360 105mm Cartridge was a chemical artillery shell designed for use by the U.S. Army. It carried approximately 1.6 pounds (730 g) of GB.

== History ==
The U.S. Army standardized the M121 shell in 1954.

== See also ==
- M60 105mm Projectile
