= Deseret Test Center =

Coordinates: 40°45′55″N 111°49′59″W

The Deseret Test Center was a U.S. Army operated command in charge for testing chemical and biological weapons during the 1960s. The Deseret was headquartered at Fort Douglas, Utah, a former U.S. Army base.

== History ==
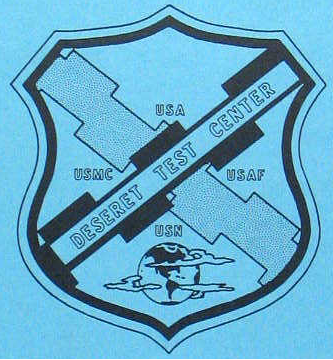
Deseret Test Center Logo features globe in aerosol cloud

Progress toward standardizing new biological warfare agents was limited from 1961 to 1962 by the lack of adequate extra-continental test facilities in which toxic agent munitions combinations could be fully assayed without the legal and safety limitations that were necessary in less remote test areas within the Continental United States.

In May 1962 the Joint Chiefs of Staff established the Deseret Test Center at Fort Douglas, Utah, a disused army base.

The U.S. Army command at Deseret was established as a result of being tasked with conducting Project 112 and Project SHAD. The Deseret project required a joint task force to undertake overseas chemical and biological testing. In response, the Joint Chiefs of Staff established the Deseret Test Center under the auspices of the U.S. Army Chemical Corps. A directive from May 28, 1962 outlined Deseret Test Center's mission:

...[To] prepare and conduct extra continental tests to assess chemical and biological weapons and defense systems, both by providing support data for research and development and by establishing a basis for the operational and logistic concepts needed for the employment of these systems.

No tests were actually conducted at Deseret Test Center however, the Deseret administration facility was supported by Dugway Proving Ground about 80 miles (130 km) away. The Deseret center occupied Building 103 and 105 at Fort Douglas, where administrative and planning decisions were made. The headquarters at Fort Douglas was staffed by 200 individuals. The U.S. Army closed Deseret Test Center in 1973.

=== Project Deseret (1961-1963) ===
Project Deseret was developed to conduct a highly classified military research, development, and testing program which was aimed at both offensive and defensive human, animal, and plant reaction to biological, chemical, toxicological, entomological and radiological warfare agents in various combinations of climate and terrain.

The top secret research was conducted by the United States' Deseret Test Center with Britain, Canada, and Australia under the Quadripartite agreement. During Project Deseret each agent needed to be tested at sea, in the arctic, desert and in tropical jungle environments. In the autumn of 1961 Project Deseret was divided into two main parts consisting of Project 112 and Project SHAD.

Project Deseret was designated to assist not only the Army but the Navy, Marine Corps and the Air Force as well. Thus, it was funded jointly by all branches of the U.S. military and U.S. intelligence agencies, a euphemism for the Central Intelligence Agency's (CIA) Office of Technical Services.

On April 17, 1963, President Kennedy signed National Security Action Memorandum 235 (NSAM 235) authorizing:

Policy guides governing the conduct of large-scale scientific or technological experiments that might have significant or protracted effects on the physical or biological environment. Experiments which by their nature could result in domestic or foreign allegations that they might have such effects will be included in this category even though the sponsoring agency feels confident that such allegations would in fact prove to be unfounded.

The deployments of Project 112 agents and field testing commenced immediately after the memorandum was signed.

== Tests ==
Between its opening in 1962 and 1973 the Deseret Test Center was at the helm of Project 112, a military operation aimed at evaluating chemical and biological weapons in differing environments. The test began in the fall of 1962 and were considered "ambitious" by the Chemical Corps; the tests were conducted at sea, in Arctic environments and in tropical environments. Tests were aimed at human, plant and animal reaction to the chemical and biological agents and were conducted in the United States, Liberia, Egypt, South Korea and Okinawa. According to the Department of Defense, Deseret planned 134 chemical and biological weapons tests and of those 46 were carried out and 62 were canceled.

The tests of Project 112, and the related seaborne Project SHAD, were kept secret until October 2002. Many tests occurred on U.S. soil and released live biological agents, chemical agents or their simulants. In total, according to the reporting of CBS News, more than 5,000 soldiers and sailors were involved in the secret tests, many of them unknowingly. From 1963-1965 there were 18 tests involving biological simulants, usually Bacillus globigii (BG). BG was used to simulate dangerous agents, such as anthrax; once thought harmless to humans, research in the intervening years has revealed some simulants can actually cause infection in those with weakened immune systems. 14 separate tests were performed using VX, sarin, nerve agent simulants and tear gases.

== See also ==
- Deseret Chemical Depot
- Human experimentation in the United States
- Fort Detrick
- Fort Douglas
- Fort Terry
- Tooele Army Depot
- Tooele Chemical Agent Disposal Facility
- Weteye bomb
