= Weteye bomb =

American chemical bomb

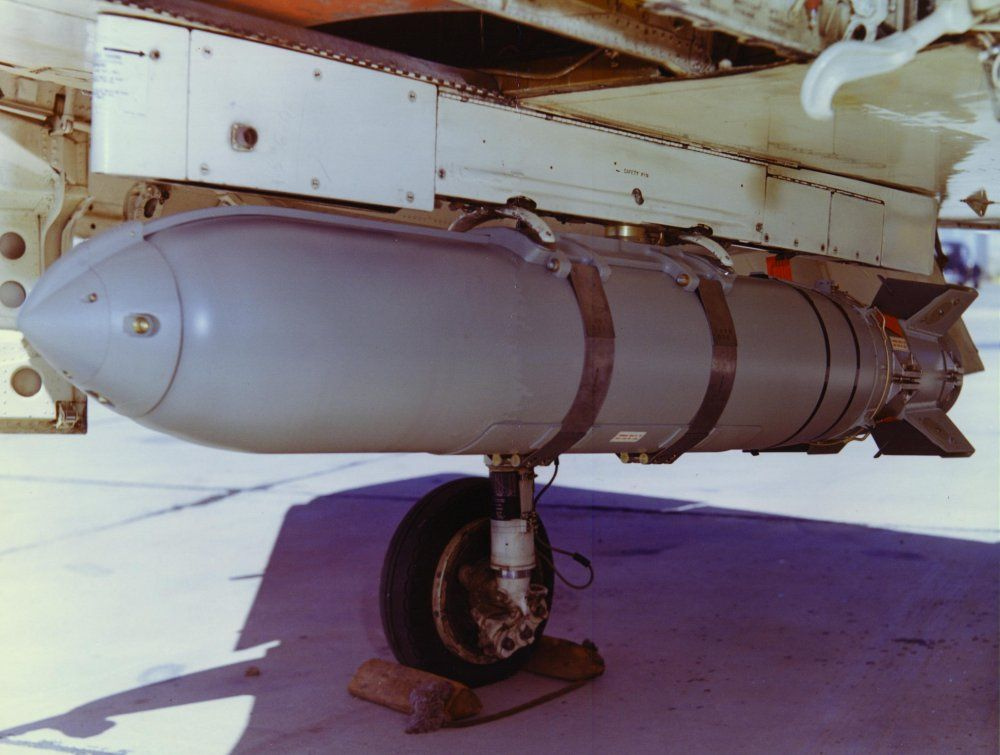
Weteye, Mk116 Mod 0

The Weteye bomb was a U.S. chemical weapon designed for the U.S. Navy and meant to deliver the nerve agent sarin. The Weteye held 160 kg (350 lb) of liquid sarin and was officially known as the Mk 116 (Mark 116). Stockpiles of Weteyes were transferred to Utah in the 1980s amidst controversy and protest.

== History ==
The Weteye bomb was developed for the United States Navy during the early 1960s. The US Navy at China Lake, California attempted to develop a massive chemical bomb with a high fill efficiency (~70%). At the same time the US Army Chemical Center worked with the EDO corporation to develop the EX 38, a 500 lb (230 kg) chemical bomb with unique design features: 1) thin seamless hydrospun aluminum body, 2) weighted nose, 3) large plastic fins, and 4) a system of internal baffles to keep the 10% minimum void captured in the tail section of the bomb. The prototype Weteye design, with its shaped internal burster and folding fins, was combined with the EX38 design features to create the production model of the Weteye.

The Weteye was originally developed for delivery of GB and VX nerve agents. Production was limited to filling with double-distilled GB. The VX variants were not produced. During the Persian Gulf War (Operation Desert Storm) there was consideration of repurposing the Weteye design to deliver firefighting chemicals to extinguish oil well fires set by retreating Iraqi forces.

In 1963, the supercarrier USS John F. Kennedy (CV-67) (SBC-127C) was intended to contain 100 Weteyes as part of its magazine load.

In 1969 the entire arsenal of US Weteye bombs were stored at the Rocky Mountain Arsenal in Colorado. Most Weteye bombs stored at Rocky Mountain Arsenal were demilitarized and destroyed in 1977; however, approximately 900 Weteye bombs were not destroyed until December 2001.

== Specifications ==
The interior of the Weteye was divided into three sections. The Weteye body was composed of thin aluminum alloy. It had fins which deployed after the bomb was released. The 240-kilogram Weteye held about 160 kg (350 lb) of liquid sarin nerve agent.

== Nomenclature ==
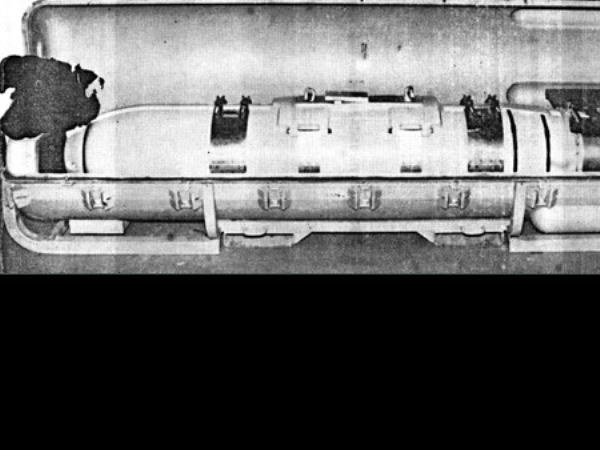
Weteye bomb

Officially, the Weteye was known as the Mark 116, or Mk-116 bomb. While this was the official military nomenclature for the weapon, early in its production it acquired the nickname "Weteye". Weteye was derived from the fact that the weapon was filled with a liquid nerve agent, sarin, thus the "wet" portion of the name. The "eye" portion of the name was associated with it being developed by the US Navy at China Lake as part of its eye-series weapon program (bombs guided by the "Mark 1 eyeball"), a program intended to improve air-delivered munitions.

== Transfer to Utah ==
Demilitarization operations at Rocky Mountain Arsenal left exactly 888 Weteye bombs intact and in storage in Colorado. In 1981 the U.S. Department of Defense sought to relocate the weapons to the Tooele Chemical Agent Disposal Facility at the Deseret Chemical Depot. This move was opposed by many residents of Utah and the state's governor at the time Scott M. Matheson. The transfer was controversial and Matheson continued to fight it until the U.S. Senate passed a bill which included an amendment sponsored by then-U.S. Senator Gary Hart (D-CO) requiring the weapons be moved out of Colorado. Matheson's concern stemmed from the fact that some of the thin-shelled Weteyes stored in Colorado were leaking nerve agent.

After rounds of protests and legal action that went to the U.S. District Court the transfer went ahead. An Air Force C-141 jet carried the initial transfer of 64 Weteye bombs on August 12, 1981 to an air field at Dugway Proving Ground. The event was heavily covered by the media. The moves continued for the next three weeks and Weteyes were moved to the south area of the Tooele Army Depot, which became known as the Deseret Chemical Depot.

In 1996, the Deseret Chemical Depot began destruction operations of general chemical weapons. In the spring of 2001 destruction and demilitarization of the Weteyes began and the operation ended in December 2001 with the destruction of the last of 888 Weteyes.

== Disposal and transfer issues ==
Public relations officials for the Deseret Chemical Depot asserted at the time that during the 2001 disposal operations there were "no problems". However, Eric Croddy reported in his 2005 book Weapons of Mass Destruction: An Encyclopedia of Worldwide Policy, Technology, and History that a number of issues came up during the destruction operations. One of those issues, that of leaking munitions, was an issue long before the weapons arrived at Deseret and the primary reason that Gov. Matheson and many Utah residents were opposed to the weapons transfer in the first place.

Other issues to surface during disposal operations were high levels of mercury contamination and the tendency of the aluminum casing to explode inside the decontamination furnace. Molten aluminum and water presents a potential explosion hazard and because the Weteye contained a liquid nerve agent the potential for an interaction of molten aluminum and the liquid agent existed. These issues combined to make the Weteye sufficiently difficult to dispose of that it required special handling.

== See also ==
- Bigeye bomb
