= Operation CHASE =

US Department of Defense program

Operation CHASE (an acronym for "Cut Holes And Sink 'Em") was a United States Department of Defense program for the disposal of unwanted munitions at sea from May 1964 until the early 1970s. Munitions were loaded onto ships to be scuttled once they were at least 250 miles (400 km) offshore. While most of the sinkings involved conventional weapons, four of them involved chemical weapons. The disposal site for the chemical weapons was a three-mile (5 km) area of the Atlantic Ocean between the coast of the U.S. state of Florida and the Bahamas. Other weapons were disposed of in various locations in the Atlantic and Pacific oceans. The CHASE program was preceded by the United States Army disposal of 8,000 short tons of mustard and lewisite chemical warfare gas aboard the scuttled SS William C. Ralston in April 1958. These ships were sunk by having Explosive Ordnance Disposal (EOD) teams open seacocks on the ship after they arrived at the disposal site. The typical Liberty ship sank about three hours after the seacocks were opened.

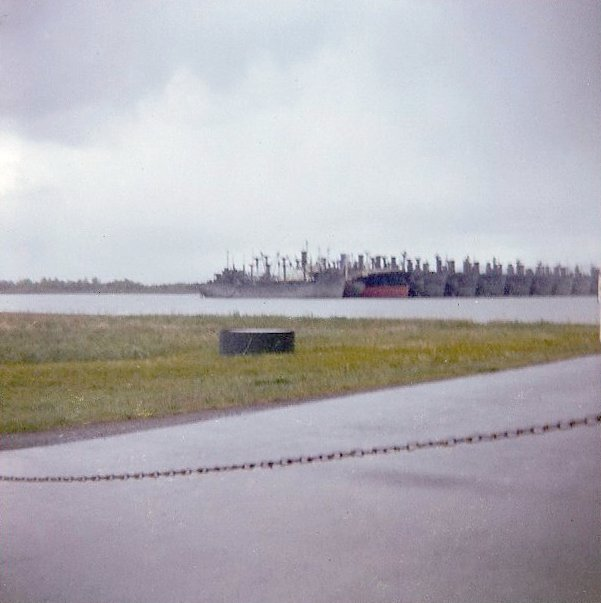
Decommissioned Liberty ships were filled with obsolete munitions and sunk at sea.

== Operations ==
=== CHASE 1 ===
The mothballed C-3 Liberty ship John F. Shafroth was taken from the National Defense Reserve Fleet at Suisun Bay and towed to the Concord Naval Weapons Station for stripping and loading. A major fraction of the munitions in CHASE 1 was Bofors 40 mm gun ammunition from the Naval Ammunition Depot at Hastings, Nebraska. CHASE 1 also included bombs, torpedo warheads, naval mines, cartridges, projectiles, fuzes, detonators, boosters, overage UGM-27 Polaris motors, and a quantity of contaminated cake mix an army court had ordered dumped at sea. Shafroth was sunk 47 miles (76 km) off San Francisco on 23 July 1964 with 9,799 tons of munitions.

=== CHASE 2 ===
Village was loaded with 7,348 short tons of munitions at the Naval Weapons Station Earle and towed to a deep-water dump site on 17 September 1964. There were three large and unexpected detonations five minutes after Village slipped beneath the surface. An oil slick and some debris appeared on the surface. The explosion registered on seismic equipment all over the world. Inquiries were received regarding seismic activity off the east coast of the United States, and the Office of Naval Research and Advanced Research Projects Agency expressed interest in measuring the differences between seismic shocks and underwater explosive detonations to detect underwater nuclear detonations then banned by treaty.

=== CHASE 3 ===
Coastal Mariner was loaded with 4040 short tons of munitions at the Naval Weapons Station Earle. The munitions included 512 tons of explosives. Four SOFAR bombs were packed in the explosives cargo hold with booster charges of 500 pounds (227 kg) of TNT to detonate the cargo at a depth of 1,000 feet (300 m). The United States Coast Guard issued a notice to mariners and the United States Department of Fish and Wildlife and the United States Bureau of Commercial Fisheries sent observers. The explosives detonated seventeen seconds after Coastal Mariner slipped below the surface on 14 July 1965. The detonation created a 600-foot (200 m) waterspout but was not deep enough to be recorded on seismic instruments.

=== CHASE 4 ===
Santiago Iglesias was loaded with 8,715 tons of munitions at the Naval Weapons Station Earle, rigged for detonation at 1,000 feet (300 m), and detonated 31 seconds after sinking on 16 September 1965.

=== CHASE 5 ===
Isaac Van Zandt was loaded with 8,000 tons of munitions (including 400 tons of high explosives) at the Naval Base Kitsap and rigged for detonation at 4,000 feet (1.2 km). On 23 May 1966 the tow cable parted en route to the planned disposal area. Navy tugs USS Tatnuck (ATA-195) and USS Koka (ATA-185) recovered the tow within six hours, but the location of sinking was changed by the delay.

=== CHASE 6 ===
Different sources describe CHASE 6 differently. Naval Institute Proceedings indicates Horace Greeley was loaded at the Naval Weapons Station Earle, rigged for detonation at 4,000 feet (1.2 km), and detonated on 28 July 1966. Other sources describe CHASE 6 as the Liberty ship Robert Louis Stevenson loaded with 2,000 tons of explosives at Naval Base Kitsap in July 1967 as part of the ONR and ARPA investigation to detect underwater nuclear tests. Robert Louis Stevenson failed to sink as rapidly as had been predicted and drifted into water too shallow to actuate the hydrostatic-pressure detonators. The tug Tatnuck involved in towing Robert Louis Stevenson was reported by Proceedings as towing Izaac Van Zandt a year earlier for CHASE 5.

=== CHASE 7 ===
Michael J. Monahan was loaded with overage UGM-27 Polaris motors at the Naval Weapons Station Charleston and sunk without detonation on 30 April 1967.

=== CHASE 8 ===
The first chemical weapons disposal via the program was in 1967 and designated CHASE 8. CHASE 8 disposed of mustard gas and GB-filled M-55 rockets. All of the cargo was placed aboard a merchant hulk (the S.S. Corporal Eric G. Gibson) and was then sunk in deep water off the continental shelf.

=== CHASE 9 ===
Eric G. Gibson was sunk on 15 June 1967.

=== CHASE 10 ===
CHASE 10 dumped 3,000 tons of United States Army nerve agent filled rockets encased in concrete vaults. The ship used was the LeBaron Russell Briggs. Public controversy delayed CHASE 10 disposal until August 1970. Public awareness of operation CHASE 10 was increased by mass media reporting following delivery of information from the Pentagon to the office of U.S. Representative Richard McCarthy in 1969. Both American television and print media followed the story with heavy coverage. In 1970, 58 separate reports were aired on the three major network news programs on NBC, ABC and CBS concerning Operation CHASE. Similarly, The New York Times included Operation CHASE coverage in 42 separate issues during 1970, 21 of those in the month of August. The publicity played a role in ending the practice of dumping chemical weapons at sea.

=== CHASE 11 ===
CHASE 11 occurred in June 1968 and disposed of United States Army GB and VX, all sealed in tin containers.

=== CHASE 12 ===
CHASE 12, in August 1968, again disposed of United States Army mustard agent and was numerically (although not chronologically) the final mission to dispose of chemical weapons.

== Aftermath ==
Operation CHASE was exposed to the public during a time when the army, especially the Chemical Corps, was under increasing public criticism. CHASE was one of the incidents which led to the near disbanding of the Chemical Corps in the aftermath of the Vietnam War. Concerns were raised over the program's effect on the ocean environment as well as the risk of chemical weapons washing up on shore. The concerns led to the Marine Protection, Research, and Sanctuaries Act of 1972, which prohibited such future missions. After a treaty was drafted by the United Nations' London Convention in 1972, an international ban came into effect as well.

== See also ==
- Dugway sheep incident
- Operation Red Hat
