= Tooele Army Depot =

Facility of the US Army Joint Munitions Command

Coordinates: 40°32′N 112°20′W

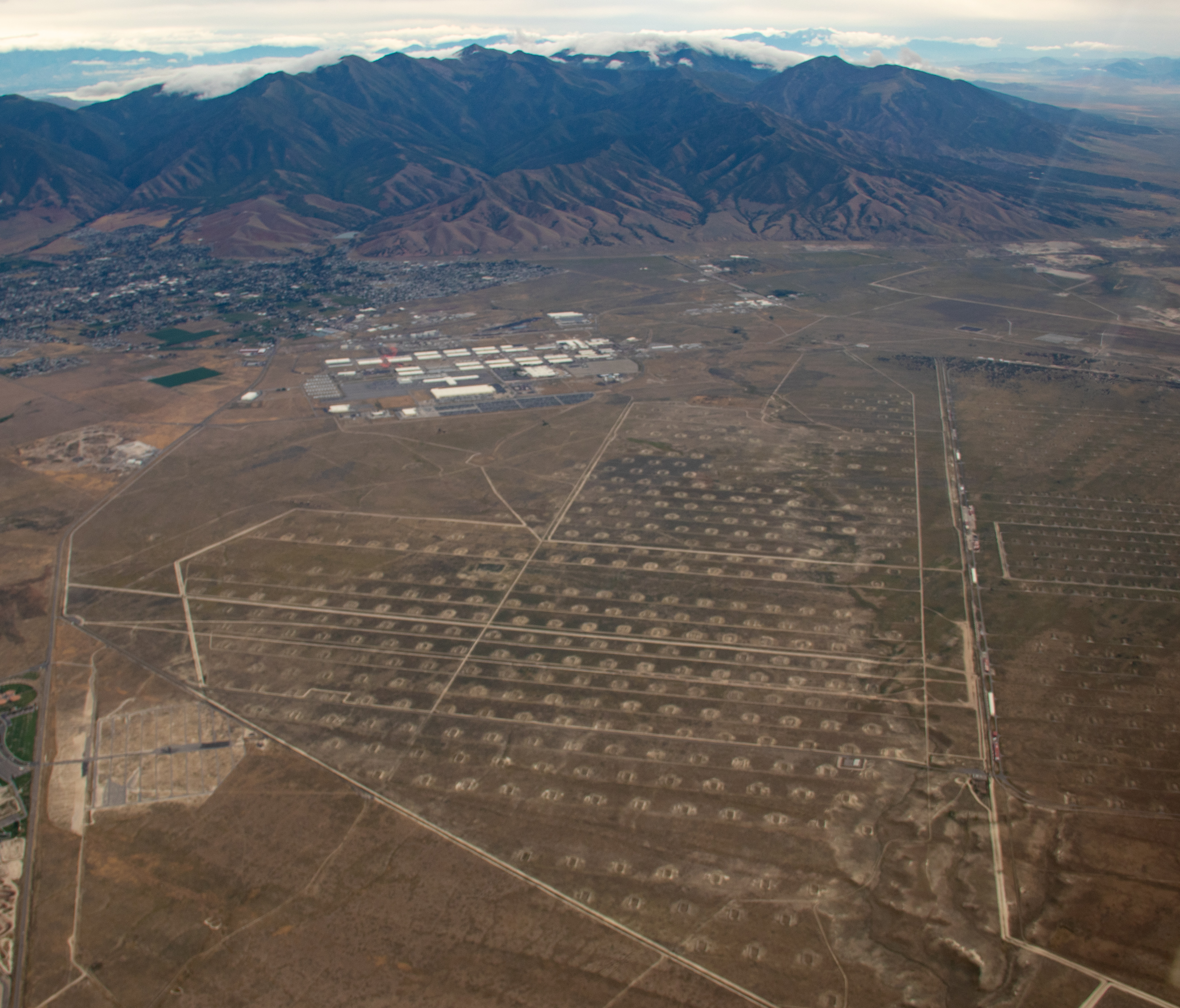
Tooele Army Depot weapons and munitions storage

Tooele Army Depot (TEAD) is a United States Army Joint Munitions Command post in Tooele County, Utah. It serves as a storage site for war reserve and training ammunition. The depot stores, issues, receives, renovates, modifies, maintains and demilitarizes conventional munitions. The depot also serves as the National Inventory Control Point for ammunition-peculiar equipment, developing, fabricating, modifying, storing and distributing such equipment to all services and other customers worldwide. TEAD provides base support to Deseret Chemical Depot.

Tooele Army Depot originally opened in 1942 during the early phase of U.S. involvement in World War II. The workforce at the post is now primarily composed of civilians. A full colonel serves as the commander. As of July 2022, Colonel Eric B. Dennis is the depot's commander.

== Capabilities ==
Capabilities of the depot include: engineering; explosives performance testing; logistical support; machining, fabrication, assembly, repair; robotics; non-destructive testing; demilitarization; laser cutting; and Slurry Emulsion Manufacturing Facility.

== History ==
Built in 1942, TEAD was originally called the Tooele Ordnance Depot and was a storage depot for war supplies. In 1988, TEAD acquired the general supply storage mission from Pueblo Army Depot. In 1955 Tooele Army Depot took over the rail equipment repair shop at Hill Air Force Base near Roy, Utah; and the site operated as a satellite of TEAD until 1994. In BRAC 1993, it lost its troop support mission, maintenance and storage missions. TEAD retained its ammunition logistics support function.

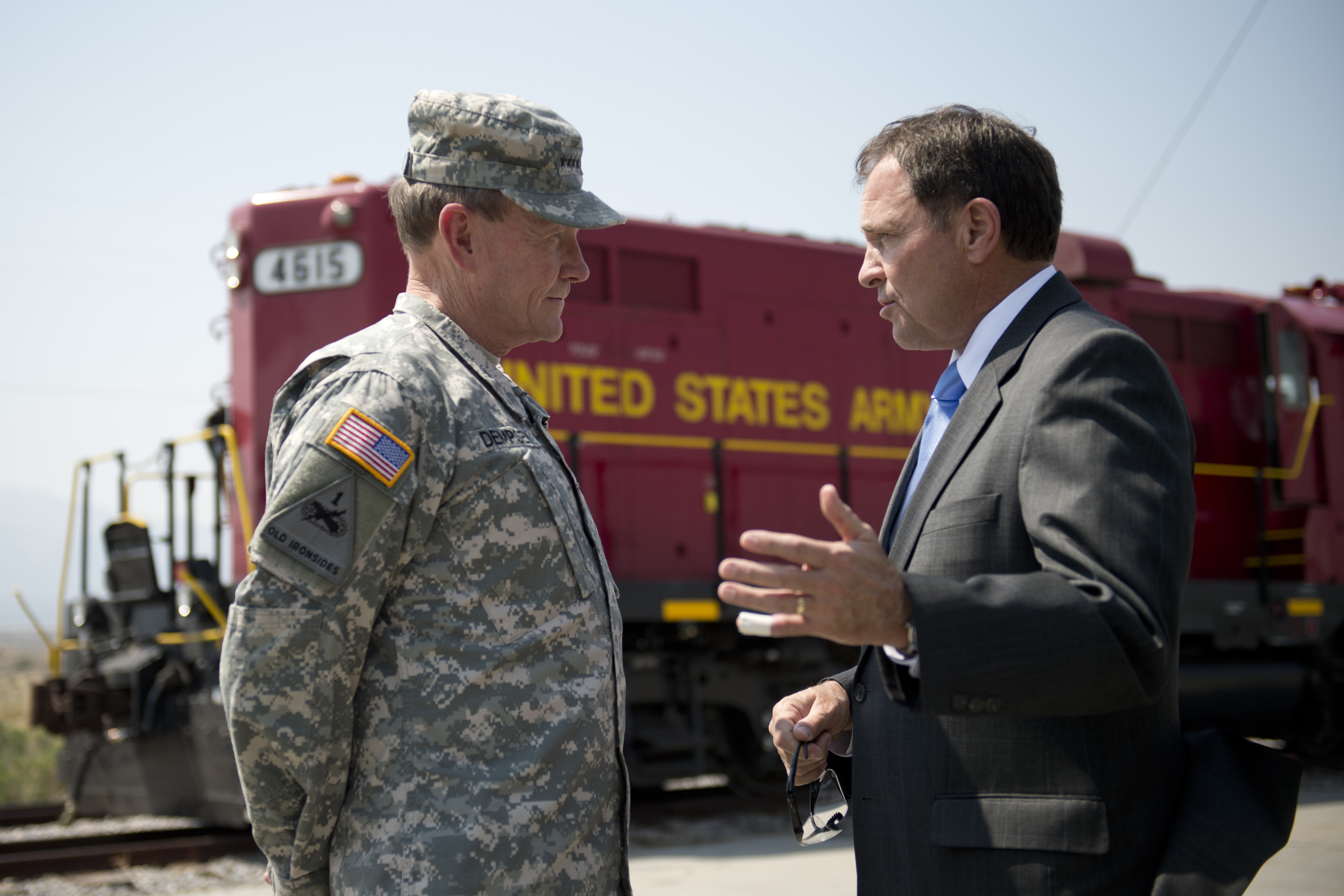
Then Utah Governor Gary Herbert with Martin E. Dempsey at the Tooele Army Depot in 2012.

== Facilities ==
TEAD is housed on 23,610 acres (95.5 km^{2}) with 1,093 buildings, 902 igloos and storage capacity of 2,483,000 square feet (230,700 m^{2}).

== BRAC 1995 ==
TEAD gained the ammunition storage function from Sierra Army Depot, which was realigned due to 1995 Base Realignment and Closure Commission.

== Environment ==
TEAD was placed on the Environmental Protection Agency’s National Priority List (Superfund) in 1990.

In 2009, the Tooele Army Depot was awarded the 31st Annual Secretary of the Army Energy and Water Management Award and the 2009 Federal Energy and Water Management Award. This was based on conservation efforts which saved TEAD more than $60,000 and nearly 100 million gallons of water per year.

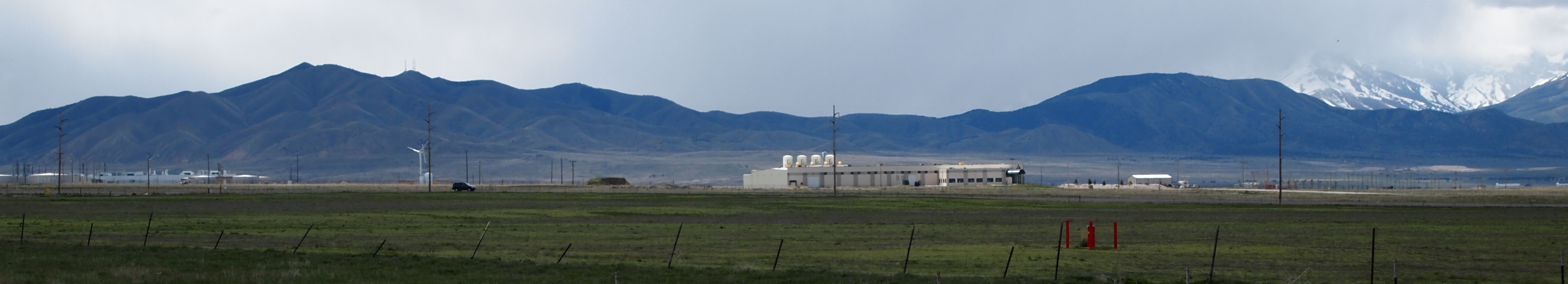
Panorama of the depot

== See also ==
- Deseret Chemical Depot
- Deseret Test Center
- Dugway Proving Ground
- Tooele Chemical Agent Disposal Facility
- Umatilla Chemical Depot
- Kambarka
- Porton Down
- Edgewood Chemical Activity
- Dzerzhinsk, Russia
- Pine Bluff Arsenal
