= People sniffer =

Personnel detectors used by the United States military during the Vietnam War

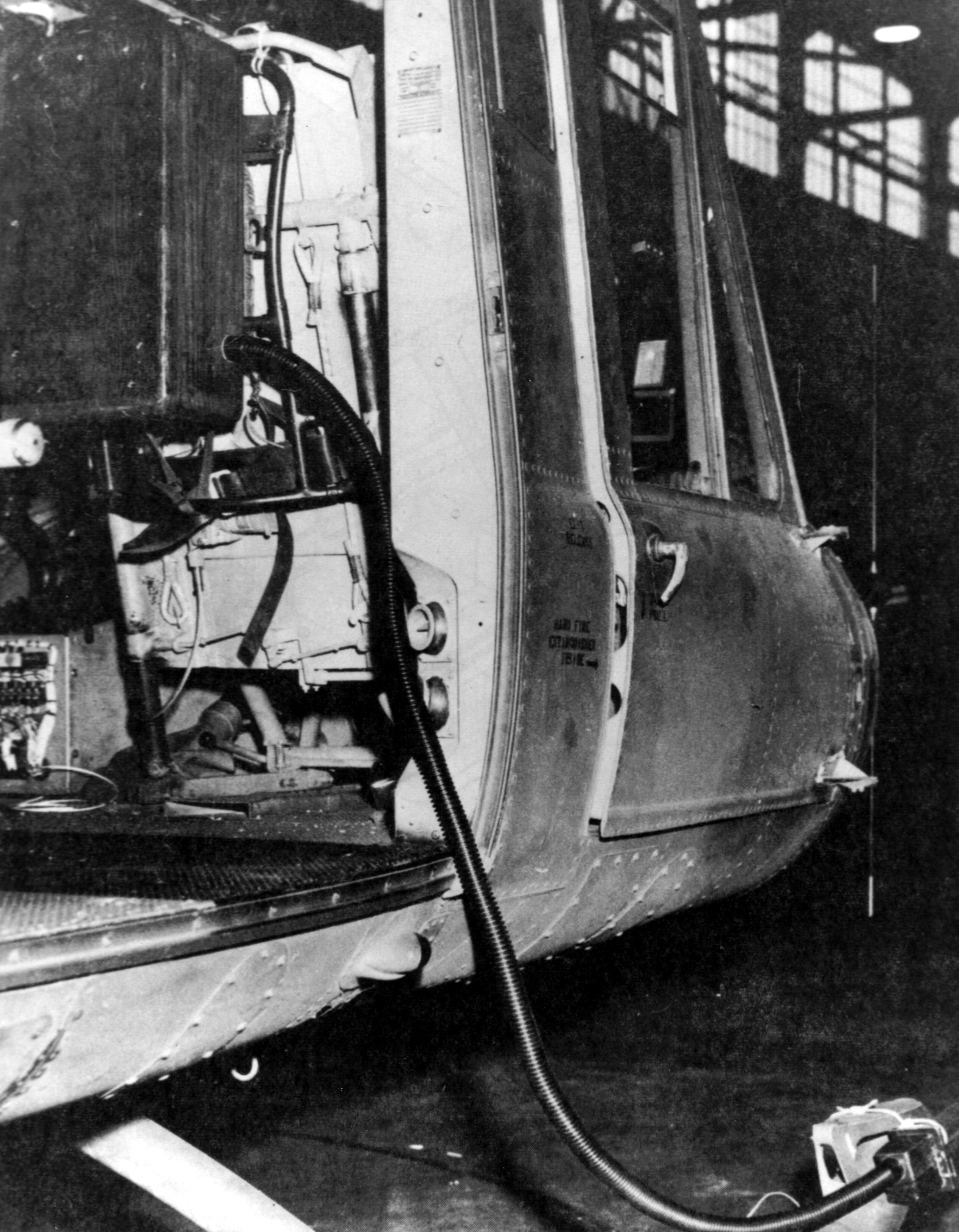
Mock-up of a XM-2 people sniffer on a UH-1 Iroquois helicopter.

People sniffer was the field name for a series of U.S. Army issued "personnel detectors" used during the Vietnam War. The purpose was to detect enemy soldiers in hidden positions, which were often employed in the jungle combat conditions of Vietnam. The U.S. military used two different versions of the people sniffer, one backpack version and one helicopter-mounted version.

== Detection method ==
The detection method used by people sniffers depended on chemical compounds that are emitted only by human beings, such as those found in urine and sweat. The technology was developed by General Electric for the Army's Chemical Corps. Sweat, being partially composed of ammonia, when combined with hydrochloric acid produces ammonium chloride. Chemical officers planned the detection missions, later known as Operation Snoopy, while individual Chemical Corps soldiers learned how to use the detector equipment and conduct detection operations.

== XM-2 ==
The XM-2 personnel detector manpack, also known as the E63 manpack personnel detector, was the first version of the people sniffer employed by the Army. The XM-2 featured a backpack mounted sensor with an air intake tube on the end of a rifle. The XM-2 was problematic, as it often detected the soldier carrying it rather than the enemy. The device also made a distinct sound, easily detectable by the enemy.

== XM-3 ==
The XM-3 airborne personnel detector was a helicopter mounted personnel detector and the second version of the people sniffers. The XM-3 used two independent and identical units that operated in two separate modes. In 1970, the XM-3 became the M3 personnel detector; the M3 became standard issue and was employed almost daily in LOH-6, OH-58, and UH-1 helicopters.

== Effectiveness ==
While useful, the detectors had to be used with some caution. People sniffers were known to be oversensitive and would often detect civilians or animals excreting bodily waste. In 1967 the Army Scientific Advisory Panel sent John D. Baldeschwieler to Vietnam in order to conduct controlled experiments and determine the ability of the people sniffers to detect ammonia. The tests showed that the people sniffer responded randomly to ammonia indicators, making it a very subjective instrument. Despite this, the ability of the people sniffer to detect other effluents, such as smoke, helped it to remain a valuable tool during the Vietnam War.

The Viet Cong (VC) and the North Vietnamese Army (NVA) developed effective, low-tech countermeasures to the people sniffers. The airborne sniffers soon became recognizable to the VC and NVA and they would attempt to avoid detection by not firing on Operation Snoopy missions. (Snoopy's ability to detect smoke meant it could easily locate ground troops firing with small arms, even if under cover and camouflaged.) In later Snoopy operations, the detection helicopters were disguised as gunships in order to provoke easily detectable small arms fire.

Another effective decoy used by the NVA and VC involved hanging buckets of mud with urine in trees and then moving into another area. Tactics such as these essentially rendered people sniffers ineffective in jungle terrain, but they remained useful in open areas, such as those found in the Mekong Delta.
