= Project 112 =

1962–1973 US biological and chemical weapon test project

Project 112 was a biological and chemical weapon experimentation project conducted by the United States Department of Defense from 1962 to 1973.

The project started under John F. Kennedy's administration, and was authorized by his Secretary of Defense Robert McNamara, as part of a total review of the US military. The name "Project 112" refers to this project's number in the 150 project review process authorized by McNamara. Funding and staff were contributed by every branch of the U.S. armed services and intelligence agencies—a euphemism for the Office of Technical Services of the Central Intelligence Agency's Directorate of Science & Technology. Canada and the United Kingdom also participated in some Project 112 activities.

Project 112 primarily concerned the use of aerosols to disseminate biological and chemical agents that could produce "controlled temporary incapacitation" (CTI). The test program would be conducted on a large scale at "extracontinental test sites" in the Central and South Pacific and Alaska in conjunction with Britain, Canada and Australia.

At least 50 trials were conducted; of these at least 18 tests involved simulants of biological agents (such as BG), and at least 14 involved chemical agents including sarin and VX, but also tear gas and other simulants. Test sites included Porton Down (UK), Ralston (Canada) and at least 13 US warships; the shipborne trials were collectively known as Shipboard Hazard and Defense—SHAD. The project was coordinated from Deseret Test Center, Utah.

As of 2005, publicly available information on Project 112 remains incomplete.

== Top-level directives ==
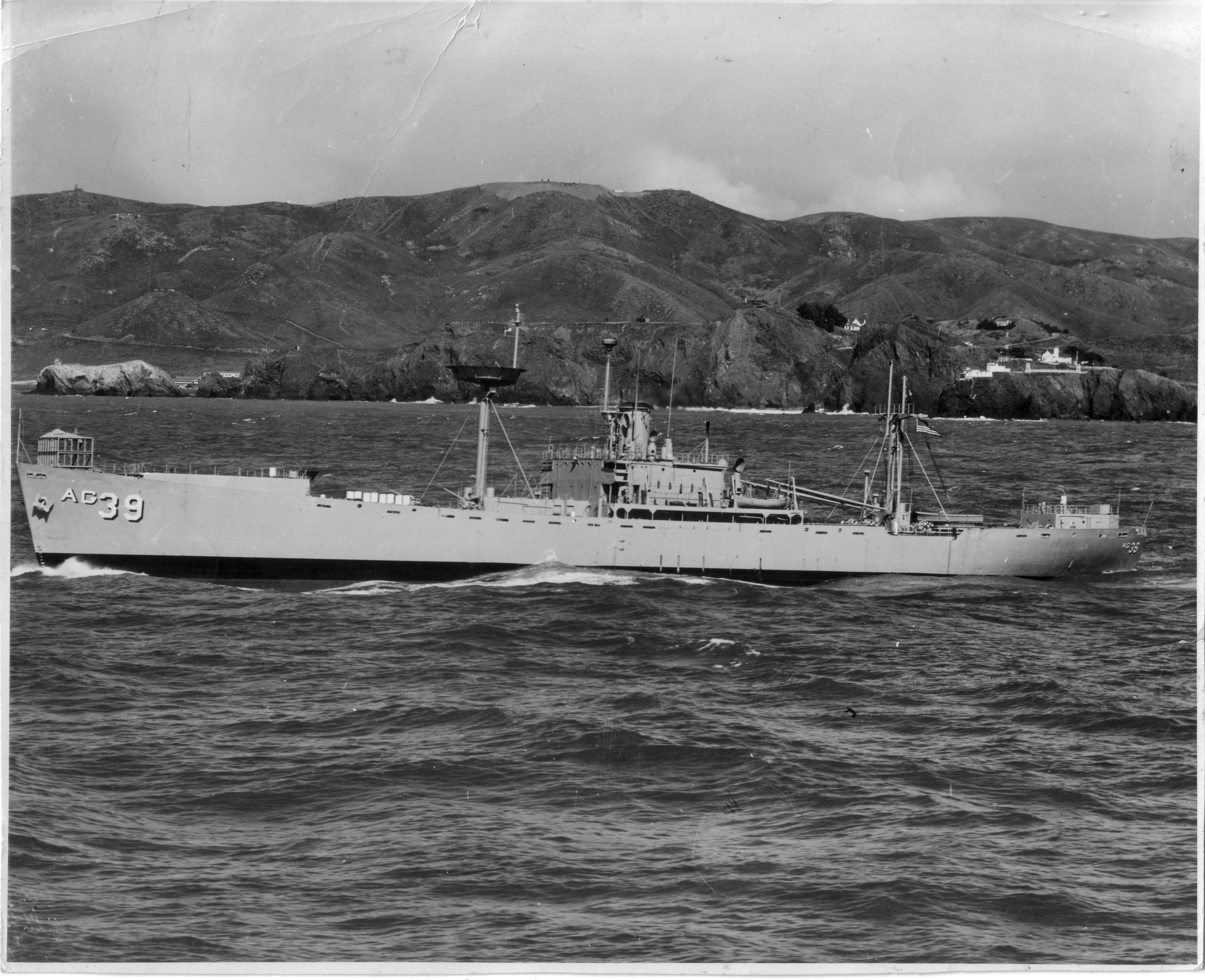
USS George Eastman (YAG-39), fitted with scientific equipment circa 1956. The ship also had a lead-lined control room and remote controlled engine room for sailing into radioactive fallout.

In January 1961, Defense Secretary Robert McNamara sent a directive about chemical and biological weapons to the Joint Chiefs of Staff, urging them to: "consider all possible applications, including use as an alternative to nuclear weapons. Prepare a plan for the development of an adequate biological and chemical deterrent capability, to include cost estimates, and appraisal of domestic and international political consequences." The Joint Chiefs established a Joint Task Force that recommended a five-year plan to be conducted in three phases.

On April 17, 1963, President Kennedy signed National Security Action Memorandum 235 (NSAM 235) which approved:

Policy guides governing the conduct of large-scale scientific or technological experiments that might have significant or protracted effects on the physical or biological environment. Experiments which by their nature could result in domestic or foreign allegations that they might have such effects will be included in this category even though the sponsoring agency feels confident that such allegations would in fact prove to be unfounded.

Project 112 was a highly classified military testing program which was aimed at both offensive and defensive human, animal, and plant reaction to biological and chemical warfare in various combinations of climate and terrain. The U.S. Army Chemical Corps sponsored the United States portion of an agreement between the US, Britain, Canada, and Australia to negotiate, host, conduct, or participate in mutual interest research and development activity and field testing.

== Command ==
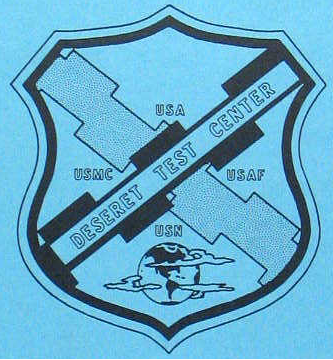
Deseret Test Center Logo features globe in aerosol cloud

The command structure for the Deseret Test Center, which was organized to oversee Project 112, somewhat bypassed standard Defense Department channels and reported directly to the Joint Chiefs of Staff and US Cabinet consisting of Secretary of Defense, Secretary of State, and to a much smaller extent, the Secretary of Agriculture. Experiments were planned and conducted by the Deseret Test Center and Deseret Chemical Depot at Fort Douglas, Utah. The tests were designed to test the effects of biological weapons and chemical weapons on personnel, plants, animals, insects, toxins, vehicles, ships and equipment. Project 112 and Project SHAD experiments involved unknowing test subjects who did not give informed consent, and took place on land and at sea in various climates and terrains. Experiments involved humans, plants, animals, insects, aircraft, ships, submarines and amphibious vehicles.

== Biological weapons tests ==
There was a large variety of goals for the proposed tests, for example: "selected protective devices in preventing penetration of a naval ship by a biological aerosol," the impact of "meteorological conditions on weapon system performance over the open sea," the penetrability of jungle vegetation by biological agents, "the penetration of an arctic inversion by a biological aerosol cloud," "the feasibility of an offshore release of Aedes aegypti mosquito as a vector for infectious diseases," "the feasibility of a biological attack against an island complex," and the study of the decay rates of biowarfare agents under various conditions.

Project 112 tests used the following agents and simulants: Francisella tularensis, Serratia marcescens, Escherichia coli, Bacillus globii, staphylococcal enterotoxin Type B, Puccinia graminis var. tritici (stem rust of wheat). Agents and simulants were usually dispensed as aerosols using spraying devices or bomblets.

In May 1965, vulnerability tests in the U.S. using the anthrax simulant Bacillus globigii were performed in the Washington, D.C. area by SOD covert agents. One test was conducted at the Greyhound bus terminal and the other at the north terminal of the National Airport. In these tests the bacteria were released from spray generators hidden in specially built briefcases. SOD also conducted a series of tests in the New York City Subway system between 7 and 10 June 1966 by dropping light bulbs filled with Bacillus subtilis var. niger. In the latter tests, results indicated that a city-level epidemic would have occurred. Local police and transit authorities were not informed of these tests.

== SHAD – Shipboard Hazard and Defense ==
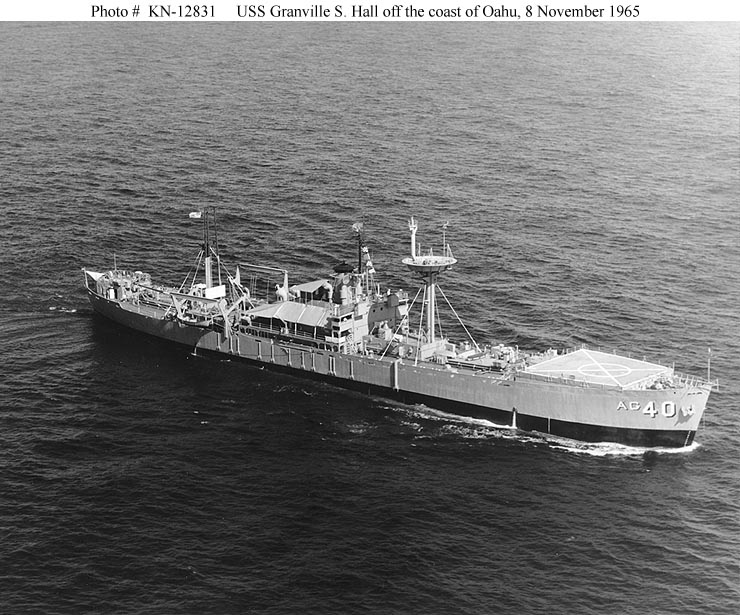
USS Granville S. Hall – 1965

Project SHAD, an acronym for Shipboard Hazard and Defense (or sometimes Decontamination), was part of the larger program called Project 112, which was conducted during the 1960s. Project SHAD encompassed tests to identify U.S. warships' vulnerabilities to attack with chemical or biological warfare agents and develop procedures to respond to such attacks while maintaining a war-fighting capability. The Department of Defense (DoD) states that Project 112 was initiated out of concern for the United States' ability to protect and defend against potential CB threats. Project 112 consisted of land-based and sea-based tests. The sea-based tests called Project SHAD were primarily launched from other ships such as the USS Granville S. Hall (YAG-40) and USS George Eastman (YAG-39), Army tugboats, submarines, or fighter aircraft and were designed to identify U.S. warships' vulnerabilities to attacks with chemical or biological warfare agents and to develop decontamination and other methods to counter such attacks while maintaining a war-fighting capability. The classified information related to SHAD was not completely cataloged or located in one facility. Furthermore, the Deseret Test Center was closed in the 1970s and the search for 40-year-old documents and records kept by different military services in different locations was a challenge to researchers. A fact sheet was developed for each test conducted, and when a test cancellation was not documented, a cancellation analysis was developed outlining the logic used to presume that the test had been cancelled.

== Declassification ==
The existence of Project 112 (along with the related Project SHAD) was categorically denied by the military until May 2000, when a CBS Evening News investigative report produced dramatic revelations about the tests. This report caused the Department of Defense and the Department of Veterans Affairs to launch an extensive investigation of the experiments, and reveal to the affected personnel their exposure to toxins.

Revelations concerning Project SHAD were first exposed by independent producer and investigative journalist Eric Longabardi. Longabardi's six-year investigation into the still-secret program began in early 1994. It ultimately resulted in a series of his investigative reports, which were broadcast on the CBS Evening News in May 2000. After the broadcast of these exclusive reports, the Pentagon and Veteran's Administration opened their own ongoing investigations into the long classified program. In 2002, Congressional hearings on Project SHAD, in both the Senate and House, further shed media attention on the program. In 2002, the US sailors exposed in the testing filed a federal class action lawsuit. Additional actions, including a multi-year medical study, were conducted by National Academy of Sciences/Institute of Medicine to assess the potential medical harm caused to the thousands of unwitting US Navy sailors, civilians, and others exposed in the secret testing. The results of that study were released in May 2007.

Because most participants involved with Project 112 and SHAD were unaware of any tests, no effort was made to ensure the informed consent of the military personnel. The US Department of Defense (DoD) conducted testing of agents in other countries that was considered too unethical to perform in the United States. Until 1998, the Department of Defense stated officially that Project SHAD did not exist. Because the DoD refused to acknowledge the program, surviving test subjects were unable to obtain disability payments for health issues related to the project. US Representative Mike Thompson said of the program and the DoD's effort to conceal it, "They told me – they said, but don't worry about it, we only used simulants. And my first thought was, well, you've lied to these guys for 40 years, you've lied to me for a couple of years. It would be a real leap of faith for me to believe that now you're telling me the truth."

The Department of Veterans Affairs commenced a three-year study comparing known SHAD-affected veterans to veterans of similar ages not involved in any way with SHAD or Project 112. The study cost approximately US$3 million, and results are being compiled for future release. DoD has committed to providing the VA with information it needs to settle benefits claims as quickly and efficiently as possible and to evaluate and treat veterans involved in those tests. This required analyzing historical documents recording the planning and execution of Project 112/SHAD tests.

The released historical information about Project 112 from DoD consists of summary fact sheets rather than original documents or maintained federal information. As of 2003, 28 fact sheets were released, focusing on the Deseret Test Center in Dugway, Utah, which was built entirely for Project 112/SHAD and was closed after the project was finished in 1973.

Original records are missing or incomplete. For example, a 91-meter aerosol test tower was sprayed by an F-4E with "aerosols" on Ursula Island in the Philippines and appears in released original Project SHAD documentation but without a fact sheet or further explanation or disclosure as to the nature of the test that was conducted or even what the test was called.

== Criticisms after disclosure of CBW testing ==
=== Transfer of Japanese technical information (1945–1946) ===
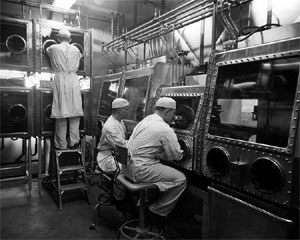
Class III cabinets at the U.S. Biological Warfare Laboratories, Camp Detrick, Maryland (Photo, 1940s)

Author Sheldon H. Harris researched the history of Japanese Biological warfare and the American cover-up extensively. Harris and other scholars found that U.S. intelligence authorities seized the Japanese researchers' archive after the technical information was provided by Japan. The information was transferred in an arrangement that exchanged keeping the information a secret and not pursuing war crimes charges. The arrangement with the United States concerning Japanese WMD research provided extensive Japanese technical information in exchange for not pursuing certain charges and also allowed Japan's government to deny knowledge of the use of these weapons by Japan's military in China during World War II. German scientists in Europe also skipped war crimes charges and went to work as U.S. employed intelligence agents and technical experts in an arrangement known as Operation Paperclip.

The U.S. would not cooperate when the Soviet Union attempted to pursue war crimes charges against the Japanese. General Douglas MacArthur denied the U.S. Military had any captured records on Japan's military biological program. "The U.S. denial was absolutely misleading but technically correct as the Japanese records on biological warfare were then in the custody of U.S intelligence agencies rather than in possession of the military". A formerly top secret report by the U.S. War Department at the close of World War II clearly stipulates that the United States exchanged Japan's military technical information on Biological Warfare experimentation against humans, plants, and animals in exchange for war crimes immunity. The War department notes that, "The voluntary imparting of this BW information may serve as a forerunner for obtaining much additional information in other fields of research." Armed with Nazi and Imperial Japanese biowarfare know-how, the United States government and its intelligence agencies began conducting widespread field testing of potential CBW capabilities on American cities, crops, and livestock.

It is known that Japanese scientists were working at the direction of the Japan's military and intelligence agencies on advanced research projects of the United States including America's covert biomedical and biowarfare programs from the end of World War II through at least the 1960s.

=== Congressional action and GAO investigation ===
In September 1994, the U.S. General Accounting Office (GAO) found that DOD and other national security agencies studied "hundreds, perhaps thousands" of weapons tests and experiments involving large area coverage of hazardous substances between 1940 and 1974. The report states:

...Dugway Proving Ground is a military testing facility located approximately 80 miles (130 km) from Salt Lake City. For several decades, Dugway has been the site of testing for various chemical and biological agents. From 1951 through 1969, hundreds, perhaps thousands of open-air tests using bacteria and viruses that cause disease in human, animals, and plants were conducted at Dugway... It is unknown how many people in the surrounding vicinity were also exposed to potentially harmful agents used in open-air tests at Dugway.

Innocent civilians in cities, on subways and at airports were sprayed with disease-carrying mosquitoes, "aerosols" containing bacteria, viruses, or exposed to a variety of dangerous chemical, biological and radiological agents as well as stimulant agents later found to be more dangerous than first thought.

Precise information on the number of tests, experiments, and participants is not available and the exact number of veterans exposed will probably never be known.

On December 2, 2002, President George W. Bush signed Public Law 107–314, the Bob Stump National Defense Authorization Act (NDAA) for Fiscal Year 2003 which included Section 709 entitled Disclosure of Information on Project 112 to Department of Veterans Affairs. Section 709 required disclosure of information concerning Project 112 to United States Department of Veterans Affairs (DVA) and the General Accounting Office (GAO). Public Law 107–314 required the identification and release of not only Project 112 information to VA but also that of any other project or test where a service member might have been exposed to a CBW agent and directed The Secretary of Defense to work with veterans and veterans service organizations to identify the other projects or tests conducted by the Department of Defense that may have exposed members of the Armed Forces to chemical or biological agents. However, the issues surrounding the test program were not resolved by the passage of the law and "the Pentagon was accused of continuing to withhold documents on Cold War chemical and biological weapons tests that used unsuspecting veterans as "human samplers" after reporting to Congress it had released all medically relevant information."

A 2004 GAO report revealed that of the participants identified from Project 112, 94 percent were from ship-based tests of Project SHAD that comprised only about one-third of the total number of tests conducted. The Department of Defense informed the Veterans Administration that Project 112/SHAD and Mustard Gas programs were officially closed as of June 2008 while Edgewood Arsenal testing remains open as DoD continues to identify Veterans who were "test participants" in the program. DoD's current effort to identify Cold War exposures began in 2004 and is endeavoring to identify all non-Project 112/SHAD veterans exposed to chemical and biological substances due to testing and accidents from World War II through 1975.

"America has a sad legacy of weapons testing in the Pacific...people were removed from their homes and their islands used as targets." While this statement during congressional testimony during the Department of Defense's inquiry into Project 112 was referring a completely different and separate testing program, there are common concerns about potential adverse health impacts and the timely release of information. Congress was unsatisfied with the DOD's unwillingness to disclose information relating to the scope of America's chemical and biological warfare past and provide the information necessary to assess and deal with the risks to public safety and U.S. service members' health that CBW testing may have posed or continue to pose.

Seal of the U.S. Defense Technical Information Center

A Government Accounting Office May 2004 report, Chemical and Biological Defense: DOD Needs to Continue to Collect and Provide Information on Tests and Potentially Exposed Personnel states:

During the 1962–-74 time period, the Department of Defense (DOD) conducted a classified chemical and biological warfare test program, called Project 112, that might have exposed U.S. service members and others including DOD civilian personnel, DOD contractors, and foreign nationals to chemical or biological agents employed in these tests... While there is no database that contains information concerning the biological and chemical tests that have been conducted, we determined that hundreds of such classified tests and research projects were conducted outside Project 112 while it was ongoing. In addition, information from various sources shows that personnel from all services were involved in chemical and biological testing.

We learned during this review that hundreds of chemical and biological tests similar to those conducted under Project 112 were conducted during the same time period...

This study listed 31 biological field tests performed at various military installations... The study did not quantify the number of test participants nor did it identify them.

In addition, we reported in 1993 and 1994 that hundreds of radiological, chemical, and biological tests were conducted in which hundreds of thousands of people were used as test subjects.

We also reported that the Army Chemical Corps conducted a classified medical research program for developing incapacitating agents. This program involved testing nerve agents, nerve agent antidotes, psycho chemicals, and irritants... In total, Army documents identified 7,120 Army and Air Force personnel who participated in these tests. Further, GAO concluded that precise information on the scope and the magnitude of tests involving human subjects was not available, and the exact number of human subjects might never be known.

== Legal developments ==
On appeal in Vietnam Veterans of America v. Central Intelligence Agency, a panel majority held in July 2015 that Army Regulation 70-25 (AR 70–25) created an independent duty to provide ongoing medical care to veterans who many years ago participated in U.S. chemical and biological testing programs. Prior to the finding that the Army is required to provide medical care long after a veteran last participated in a testing program was a 2012 finding that the Army has an ongoing duty to seek out and provide "notice" to former test participants of any new information that could potentially affect their health. The case was initially brought forward by concerned veterans who participated in the Edgewood Arsenal human experiments.

== Controversy over inclusion of Okinawa as Extracontinental Site 2 ==
According to the document, "the 267th Chemical Company (SVC) had the mission of operation of Site 2, DOD Project 112."

Corroborating suspicions of Project 112 activities on Okinawa include "An Organizational History of the 267th Chemical company", which was made available by the U.S. Army Heritage and Education Center to Yellow Medicine County, Minnesota, Veteran's Service Officer Michelle Gatz in 2012. According to the document, the 267th Chemical Company was activated on Okinawa on December 1, 1962, as the 267th Chemical Platoon (SVC) was billeted at Chibana Depot. During this deployment, "Unit personnel were actively engaged in preparing RED HAT area, site 2 for the receipt and storage of first increment items, [shipment] "YBA", DOD Project 112." The company received further shipments, code named YBB and YBF, which according to declassified documents also included sarin, VX, and mustard gas.

The late author Sheldon H. Harris in his book "Factories of Death: Japanese Biological Warfare, 1932–1945, and the American cover up" wrote about Project 112:

The test program, which began in fall 1962 and which was funded at least through fiscal year 1963, was considered by the Chemical Corps to be "an ambitious one." The tests were designed to cover "not only trials at sea, but Arctic and tropical environmental tests as well." The tests, presumably, were conducted at what research officers designated, but did not name, "satellite sites." These sites were located both in the continental United States and in foreign countries. The tests conducted there were aimed at both human, animal and plant reaction to BW. It is known that tests were undertaken in Cairo, Egypt, Liberia, in South Korea, and in Japan's satellite province of Okinawa in 1961, or earlier. This was at least one year prior to the creation of Project 112. The Okinawa anti-crop research project may lend some insight to the larger projects 112 sponsored. BW experts in Okinawa and "at several sites in the Midwest and south:" conducted in 1961 "field tests" for wheat rust and rice blast disease. These tests met with "partial success" in the gathering of data, and led, therefore, to a significant increase in research dollars in fiscal year 1962 to conduct additional research in these areas. The money was devoted largely to developing "technical advice on the conduct of defoliation and anti-crop activities in Southeast Asia." By the end of fiscal year 1962, the Chemical Corps had let or were negotiating contracts for over one thousand chemical defoliants. The Okinawa tests evidently were fruitful.

— Harris, 2002

The U.S. government has previously disclosed information on chemical and biological warfare tests it held at sea and on land yet new-found documents show that the U.S. Army tested biological weapons in Okinawa in the early 1960s, when the prefecture was still under U.S. rule. During these tests, conducted at least a dozen times between 1961 and 1962, rice blast fungus was released by the Army using "a midget duster to release inoculum alongside fields in Okinawa and Taiwan," in order to measure effective dosages requirements at different distances and the negative effects on crop production. Rice blast or Pyricularia oryzae produces a mycotoxin called tenuazonic acid which has been implicated in human and animal disease.

== Official briefings and reports ==
A number of studies, reports and briefings have been done on chemical and biological warfare exposures. A list of the major documents is provided below.

=== Government Accountability Office reports ===
- Government Accountability Office (GAO) Report: GAO-04-410, DOD Needs to Continue to Collect and Provide Information on Tests and on Potentially Exposed Personnel, May 2004
- Government Accountability Office (GAO) Report: GAO-08-366, DOD and VA Need to Improve Efforts to Identify and Notify Individuals Potentially Exposed during Chemical and Biological Tests, February 2008

=== Secrecy Policies ===
- Release from Secrecy Oaths Under Chem-Bio Research Programs, January 11, 2011

=== Institute of Medicine reports ===
- Institute of Medicine Study: SHAD II, study in progress, 2012
- Institute of Medicine Study: Long-Term Health Effects of Participation in Project SHAD, 2007
- Supplement to Institute of Medicine Study: Long-Term Health Effects of Participation in Project SHAD, "Health Effects of Perceived Exposure to Biochemical Warfare Agents, 2004"
- Three-Part National Research Council Series Reports on Possible Long-Term Health Effects of Short-Term Exposure to Chemical Agents (1982–1985)

=== Congressional testimony ===
- Senate Committee on Veterans' Affairs Hearing: Military Exposures: The Continuing Challenges of Care and Compensation, July 10, 2002
- House Committee on Veterans' Affairs, Subcommittee on Health, Hearing: Military Operations Aspects of SHAD and Project 112, October 9, 2002
- Senate Armed Services Committee, Subcommittee on Personnel, Prepared Statement of Dr. William Winkenwerder Jr., Assistant Secretary of Defense for Health Affairs, on Shipboard Hazard and Defense, October 10, 2002

=== DoD briefings ===
- Military Service Organizations/Veterans Service Organizations Briefing: Chemical/Biological Exposure Databases, September 17, 2009
- Military Service Organizations/Veterans Service Organizations Briefing: Chemical/Biological Exposure Databases, February 21, 2008
- Extracts from 2003 Report to Congress Disclosure of Information on Project 112 to the Department of Veterans Affairs as Directed by PL 107-314, August 1, 2003 – Executive Summary and Disclosure of Information

=== News releases ===
The following is a list of Department of Defense-issued press releases for Project 112 and Project SHAD:

- June 30, 2003 – SHAD – Project 112 – Deseret Test Center Investigation Draws To A Close The Department of Defense completed today its nearly three-year investigation of operational tests conducted in the 1960s.
- December 31, 2002 – DoD corrects data on SHAD test "High Low" Since the Department of Defense began investigating the operational shipboard hazard and defense tests in September 2000, it has released fact sheets on 42 of the 46 shipboard and land-based tests.
- October 31, 2002 – DoD Releases Five Project 112 SHAD Fact Sheets The Department of Defense today released five new detailed fact sheets on Cold War-era chemical and biological warfare tests conducted in support of Project 112.
- October 9, 2002 – DoD Releases Deseret Test Center/Project 112/Project SHAD Fact Sheets The Department of Defense today released another 28 detailed fact sheets on 27 Cold War-era chemical and biological warfare tests identified as Project 112.
- July 9, 2002 – DoD expands SHAD investigationThe Department of Defense announced today an expansion of the Shipboard Hazard and Defense investigation. A team of investigators will travel to Dugway Proving Ground in mid-August to review Deseret Test Center records.
- May 23, 2002 – DoD releases Project SHAD fact sheets The Department of Defense today released detailed fact sheets on six Cold War-era chemical and biological warfare tests.
- May 23, 2002 – DoD releases six new Project SHAD fact sheets The Department of Defense released detailed fact sheets on six Cold War-era chemical and biological warfare tests.
- January 4, 2002 – DoD Releases Information on 1960 tests In the 1960s, the Department of Defense conducted a series of chemical and biological warfare vulnerability tests on naval ships known collectively as Project Shipboard Hazard and Defense.
- January 4, 2002 – No Small Feat The ongoing investigation into the Project Shipboard Hazard and Defense, or SHAD, tests is a detective story worthy of Sherlock Holmes.

== See also ==
- CFB Suffield and Suffield Experimental Station
- Dorset Biological Warfare Experiments
- Edgewood Arsenal human experiments
- Human experimentation in the United States
- Operation LAC (Large Area Coverage)
- Operation Whitecoat
- Porton Down
- United States biological weapons program
