= M122 155 mm cartridge =

The M122 155mm Cartridge was a chemical artillery shell designed to carry 6.5 lbs of a nerve agent, specifically Sarin (GB).
