= Project SHAD =

American military project

Project SHAD, an acronym for Shipboard Hazard and Defense, was part of a larger effort called Project 112, which was conducted during the 1960s. Project SHAD encompassed tests designed to identify U.S. warships' vulnerabilities to attacks with chemical agents or biological warfare agents and to develop procedures to respond to such attacks while maintaining a war-fighting capability.

== History ==
Project SHAD was part of a larger effort by the Department of Defense called Project 112. Project 112 was a chemical and biological weapons research, development, and testing project conducted by the United States Department of Defense and CIA handled by the Deseret Test Center and United States Army Chemical Materials Agency from 1962 to 1973. The project started under John F. Kennedy's administration, and was authorized by his Secretary of Defense Robert McNamara, as part of a total review of the US military. The name of the project refers to its number in the 150 review process.

== Mission ==
The Shipboard Hazard and Defense Project (SHAD) was a series of tests conducted by the U.S. Department of Defense during the 1960s to determine how well service members aboard military ships could detect and respond to chemical and biological attacks. Dee Dodson Morris of the Army Chemical Corps who coordinated the ongoing investigation, says, "The SHAD tests were intended to show how vulnerable Navy ships were to chemical or biological warfare agents. The objective was to learn how chemical or biological warfare agents would disperse throughout a ship, and to use that information to develop procedures to protect crew members and decontaminate ships." DoD investigators note that over a hundred tests were planned but the lack of test results may indicate that many tests were never actually executed. 134 tests were planned initially, but reportedly, only 46 tests were actually completed.

== Declassification ==
Public Law 107–314 required the identification and release of not only Project 112 information to the United States Veterans Administration, but also that of any other projects or tests where a veteran might have been exposed to a chemical or biological warfare agent, and directed the Secretary of Defense to work with veterans and veterans service organizations to identify the other projects or tests conducted by the Department of Defense that may have exposed members of the Armed Forces to chemical or biological agents. In 2000, the Department of Defense began the process of declassifying records about the project. According to the U.S. Department of Veteran Affairs, approximately 6,000 U.S. Service members were believed to be involved in conducting the tests. In 2002, the Department of Defense began publishing a list of fact sheets for each of the tests.

== Identification ==
Although many of the roughly 5,500 veterans who took part were aware of the tests, some were involved without their knowledge. Certain issues surrounding the test program were not resolved by the passage of the law and the Department of Defense was accused of continuing to withhold documents on Cold War chemical and biological weapons tests that used unsuspecting veterans as "human samplers" after reporting to Congress it had released all medically relevant information. A Government Accountability Office May 2004 report, Chemical and Biological Defense: DOD Needs to Continue to Collect and Provide Information on Tests and Potentially Exposed Personnel indicates that almost all participants who were identified from Project 112 — 94 percent — were from ship-based tests of Project SHAD that comprised only about one-third of the total number of tests conducted.

== Medical studies ==
Jack Alderson, a retired Navy officer who commanded the Army tugboats, told CBS News that he believes the Pentagon used him and other service members to test weapons, and that those tests included agents, vaccines, and decontamination products which have led to serious medical problems, including cancer. Secrecy agreements can now be ignored by veterans in order to pursue healthcare concerns within the Department of Veterans Affairs. The V.A. has offered screening programs for veterans who believe they were involved in DoD sponsored tests during their service. The Institute of Medicine of the National Academies has commissioned studies of Project SHAD participants. The first, Long-Term Health Effects of Participation in Project SHAD (Shipboard Hazard and Defense), was released in 2007, and found "no clear evidence that specific long-term health effects are associated with participation in Project SHAD." The second, Shipboard Hazard and Defense II (SHAD II), by the IoM's Medical Follow-up Agency (MFUA), began in 2012, and, as of April 2014, was ongoing.

== Locations of SHAD tests ==
from SHAD Fact Sheets

- Pacific Ocean
- Pacific Ocean off San Diego, CA
- Pacific Ocean, from San Diego, CA to Balboa, Panama
- Ft. Sherman, Panama Canal Zone
- Eniwetok Atoll, Marshall Islands
- Baker Island
- Island of Hawaii
- Pacific Ocean near the Island of Oahu, Hawaii
- Pacific Ocean, west of Oahu, Hawaii
- Pacific Ocean southwest of Oahu, HI
- Oahu, HI and surrounding waters
- Pacific Ocean, off Oahu, HI & surrounding water & airspace
- Pacific Ocean near Johnston Island
- Eglin Air Force Base, Florida
- Atlantic Ocean off Newfoundland, Canada

== Ships and air units involved ==
=== Ships ===
- USS Berkeley (DDG-15)
- USS Carbonero (SS-337)
- USS Carpenter (DD-825)
- USS Fechteler (DD-870)
- USS Fort Snelling (LSD-30)
- USS George Eastman (YAG-39)
- USS Granville S. Hall (YAG-40)
- USS Herbert J. Thomas (DD-833)
- USS Hoel (DDG-13)
- USS Moctobi (ATF-105)
- USS Navarro (APA-215)
- USS Okanogan (APA-220)
- USS Power (DD-839)
- USNS Samuel Phillips Lee (T-AGS 31)
- USNS Silas Bent (T-AGS-26)
- USS Tioga County (LST-1158)
- USS Tiru (SS-416)
- USS Wexford County (LST-1168)
- US Navy Lighter Barge (YFN-811)
- US Army Large Tug LT-2080
- US Army Large Tug LT-2081
- US Army Large Tug LT-2085
- US Army Large Tug LT-2086
- US Army Large Tug LT-2087
- US Army Large Tug LT-2088

=== Air units ===
- Meteorological Research Service (contractor) C-47
- US Navy Airborne Early Warning Barrier Squadron Pacific (AEWBarRonpac) Lockheed WV-2 / EC-121 Warning Star
- US Navy Patrol Squadron Four (VP-4) (PATRON Four), Fleet Air Wing Four (Lockheed P-2 Neptune)
- US Navy Patrol Squadron Six (VP-6) (PATRON SIX), Fleet Air Wing Two (Lockheed P-2 Neptune)
- US Navy VU-1 Utility Squadron One, re-designated VC-1 Composite Squadron One on July 1, 1965. (Douglas A-4 Skyhawk)
- USMC Marine Aircraft Group 13, 1st Marine Aircraft Wing, 1st Marine Expeditionary Brigade. McDonnell Douglas F-4 Phantom II, A-4 (Skyhawk), Sikorsky H-34 Seahorse
- USMC Marine Medium Helicopter Squadron 161 (HMM 161), Marine Aircraft Group 16 (MAG-16), 3rd Marine Aircraft Wing (3rd MAW) Sikorsky H-34 Seahorse
- US Air Force 4533rd Tactical Test Squadron, US Air Force 33rd Tactical Fighter Wing (F-4E Phantom II)

== See also ==
- Human experimentation in the United States
- Operation Dew
- Operation LAC
- Operation Whitecoat
- Project 112
- San Jose Project
