= United States Army Chemical Materials Activity =

U.S. chemical weapons decommissioning unit

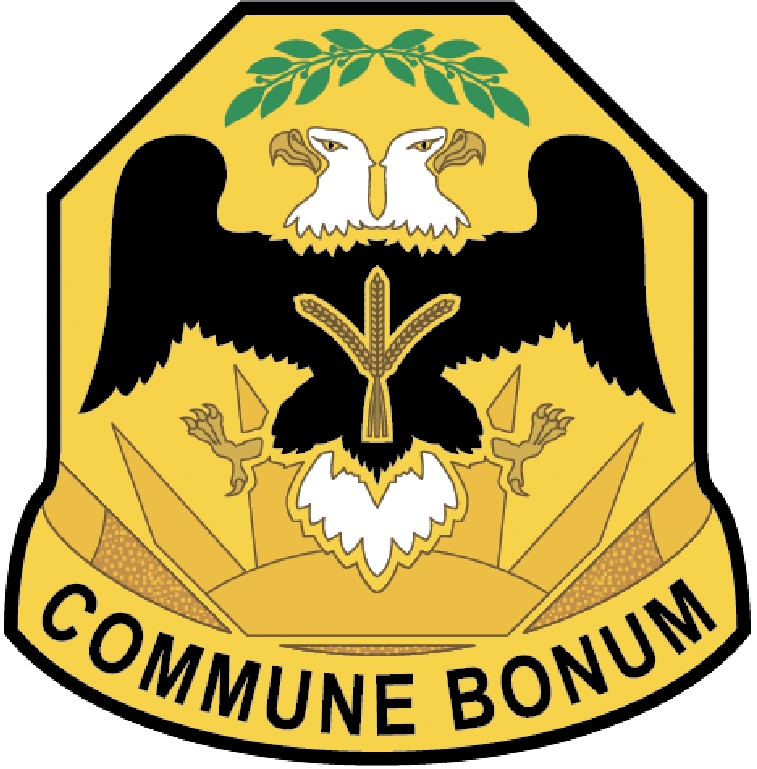
Unit insignia

The United States Army Chemical Materials Activity (CMA) is a unit of the United States Army Sustainment Command (ASC). Its role is to enhance national security by securely storing the remaining U.S. chemical warfare materiel stockpiles, while protecting the work force, the public and the environment to the maximum extent.

CMA has a history in chemical weapons destruction, safely storing, recovering, assessing and destroying materials that remain as a legacy of the former U.S. chemical weapons program. CMA managed destruction of all U.S. chemical weapons stockpiles except for the two that fall under the Department of Defense Assembled Chemical Weapons Alternatives program. Through its Chemical Stockpile Emergency Preparedness Program (CSEPP), CMA works with local, state and federal emergency preparedness and response agencies at chemical weapon stockpile locations.

== History ==
The Army combined elements from the former United States Army Soldier and Biological Chemical Command and the former Program Manager for Chemical Demilitarization to consolidate the Army's chemical agent and munitions storage and demilitarization functions under a single organization. CMA managed the U.S. chemical weapons stockpile at nine locations and had responsibility for chemical weapons disposal at seven of them. The demilitarization facilities were closed in the following order:

- 2000: Johnston Atoll Chemical Agent Disposal System (JACADS), South Pacific
- 2005: Aberdeen Chemical Agent Disposal Facility (ABCDF), Maryland
- 2008: Newport Chemical Agent Disposal Facility (NECDF), Indiana; Newport Chemical Depot closed
- 2010: Pine Bluff Chemical Agent Disposal Facility (PBCDF), Arkansas
- 2011: Anniston Chemical Agent Disposal Facility (ANCDF), Alabama
- 2011: Umatilla Chemical Agent Disposal Facility (UMCDF), Oregon; Umatilla Chemical Depot closed
- 2012: Tooele Chemical Agent Disposal Facility (TOCDF), Utah located at Deseret Chemical Depot (DCD); DCD became Tooele Army Depot-South

== Organization ==
CMA headquarters is at the Edgewood Area of Aberdeen Proving Ground in Maryland. CMA site teams are located at the individual stockpile locations where storage and destruction takes place. Only Pueblo, Colorado and Blue Grass, Kentucky still have weapons stockpiles which are managed by CMA although agent destruction will be handled by Program Executive Office, Assembled Chemical Weapons Alternatives.

== Destruction ==
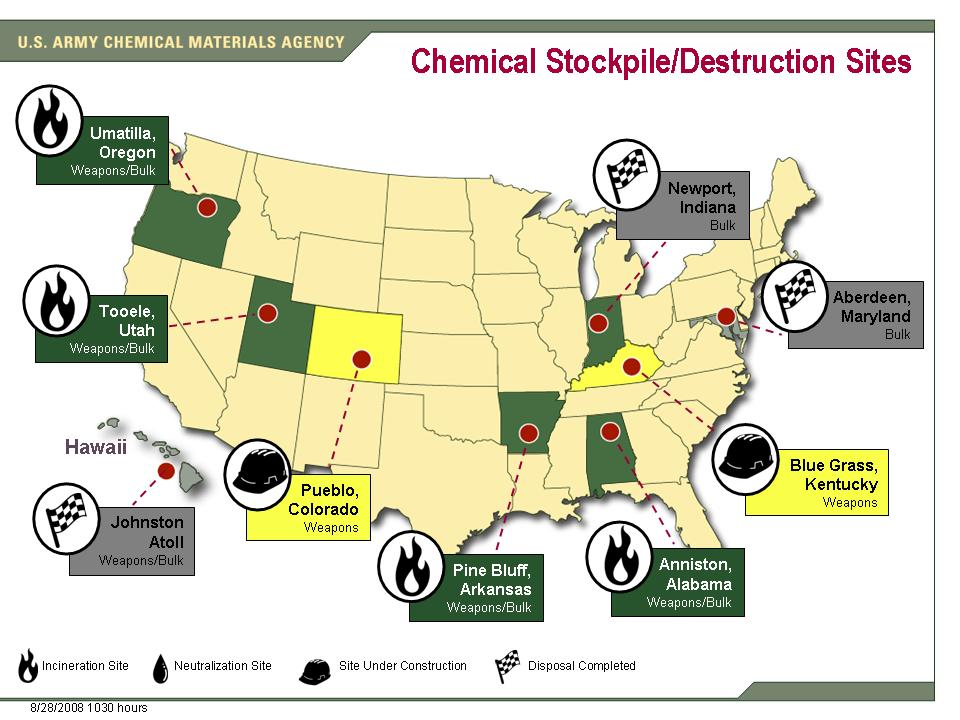
Stockpile/disposal site locations for the United States' chemical weapons and the sites operating status as of August 28, 2008

CMA was responsible for two distinct chemical weapons destruction projects.

For stockpile destruction, the Project Manager Chemical Stockpile Elimination managed the safe treatment and disposal of chemical weapons using incineration and neutralization technologies, completing its mission in 2012.

Incineration was selected as the Army's stockpile chemical weapons disposal technology in 1985 based on rigorous tests and comparisons of various technologies. Anniston, Alabama, Pine Bluff, Arkansas, Umatilla, Oregon, and Tooele, Utah, use incineration for chemical weapons destruction. The first incineration facility was built on Johnston Atoll in the Pacific Ocean and safely completed destruction operations in November 2000. The facility was dismantled and the atoll was returned to its natural state and serves as a wildlife refuge.

Neutralization was selected as an alternative to incineration for bulk agent storage sites, where chemical agent was stored in large steel containers without explosives or other weapon components. Depending on the type of agent, neutralization destroyed the chemical agent by mixing it with hot water or hot water and sodium hydroxide. The industrial wastewater produced by the process, known as hydrolysate, was sent to a permitted commercial hazardous waste storage, treatment and disposal facility for treatment and disposal. This process was used safely in Edgewood, Maryland, to eliminate its entire stockpile of mustard agent, and in Newport, Indiana, to eliminate its entire stockpile of VX nerve agent. Neutralization is the selected method for the Department of Defense's Assembled Chemical Weapons Alternatives facilities in Pueblo, Colorado, and Richmond, Kentucky.

For chemical warfare materiel that was not part of the stockpile, the Non-Stockpile Chemical Materiel Project (NSCMP) was founded in 1992 to provide centralized management and direction to the Department of Defense for the destruction of declared non-stockpile chemical materiel in a safe, environmentally sound and cost-effective manner. Now known as the Recovered Chemical Materiel Directorate (RCMD), the organization's responsibilities include assessment and treatment of recovered chemical warfare materiel declared prior to entry into force of the Chemical Weapons Convention (CWC), an international treaty signed by the United States. RMCD's non-intrusive assessment systems identify the chemical fill of recovered items and the presence of explosive components, allowing for proper handling and treatment. The items can be treated in an on-site system that contains any blast, agent and vapor. RCMD is best known for its history of responding to chemical weapons recovered at military installations, former defense sites and communities. RCMD's highly specialized equipment is employed in a manner that protects workers, citizens and the environment.

In December 2006, CMA successfully completed demolition of the nation's former chemical warfare production facilities. In November 2007, it successfully completed destruction of the binary chemical weapon inventory. In January 2012, all stockpiled chemical weapons had been destroyed at the 7 sites for which CMA had responsibility, representing 89.75% of the U.S. 1997 chemical weapon stockpile.

== Storage ==
CMA is responsible for the safe storage of the nation's entire chemical weapons stockpile before its ultimate destruction. CMA manages a National Inventory Control Point and National Maintenance Point to ensure the stockpile is maintained safely and securely during its remaining storage life.

CMA partners with the Department of Homeland Security through CSEPP to ensure effective emergency preparedness of the communities surrounding the stockpile storage sites. CSEPP provides funding for chemical accident response equipment and warning systems. CSEPP also oversees yearly community-wide emergency preparedness exercises at all of the stockpile sites and works with communities to conduct public education activities to enable residents to respond appropriately in the unlikely event of a chemical stockpile incident.

== International cooperation ==
CMA is meeting its commitment as outlined in the 1997 CWC, which more than 180 nations have signed as their pledge to rid the world of this class of weapons. CMA also shares lessons learned through its reporting to the Organisation for the Prohibition of Chemical Weapons which is charged with implementing the CWC. Finally, CMA participates in the annual international Chemical Weapons Destruction Conference in which experts from CWC member nations share technology and lessons learned.
