= M55 (rocket) =

American chemical weapon

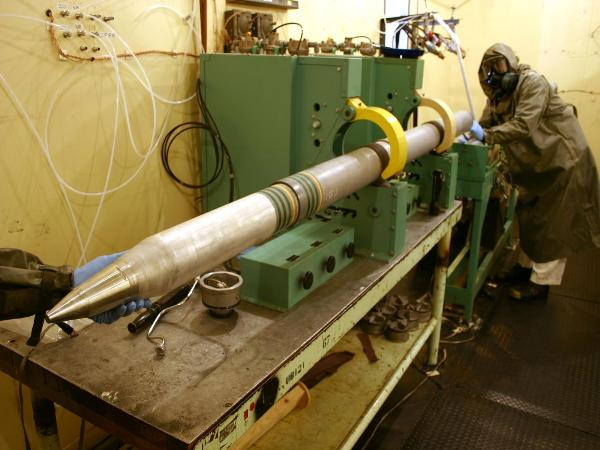
An M55 rocket being disassembled at Umatilla Chemical Depot

The M55 rocket was a chemical weapon developed by the United States in the 1950s. The United States Army produced both Sarin and VX unitary warheads for the M55.

== History ==
In 1951, the US Army Chemical Corps and Ordnance Corps initiated a joint program to develop a 115mm chemical rocket. The US Army Ordnance Corps designed the 115mm T238 and launcher in 1957 to provide the army a means to attack large area targets with chemical agents. Artillery and mortars are for small area targets; and due to different spin stabilities, warheads intended for explosives are not ideal for chemical delivery. The 115mm rocket was subsequently accepted as the M55 rocket with M91 launcher. Produced from 1959 to 1965, the M55s were manufactured at Newport Army Ammunition Plant and tested at Aberdeen Proving Ground. The Army produced unitary warheads filled with Sarin (GB) and VX nerve agents for the M55.

== Disposal and storage programs ==
=== Storage ===
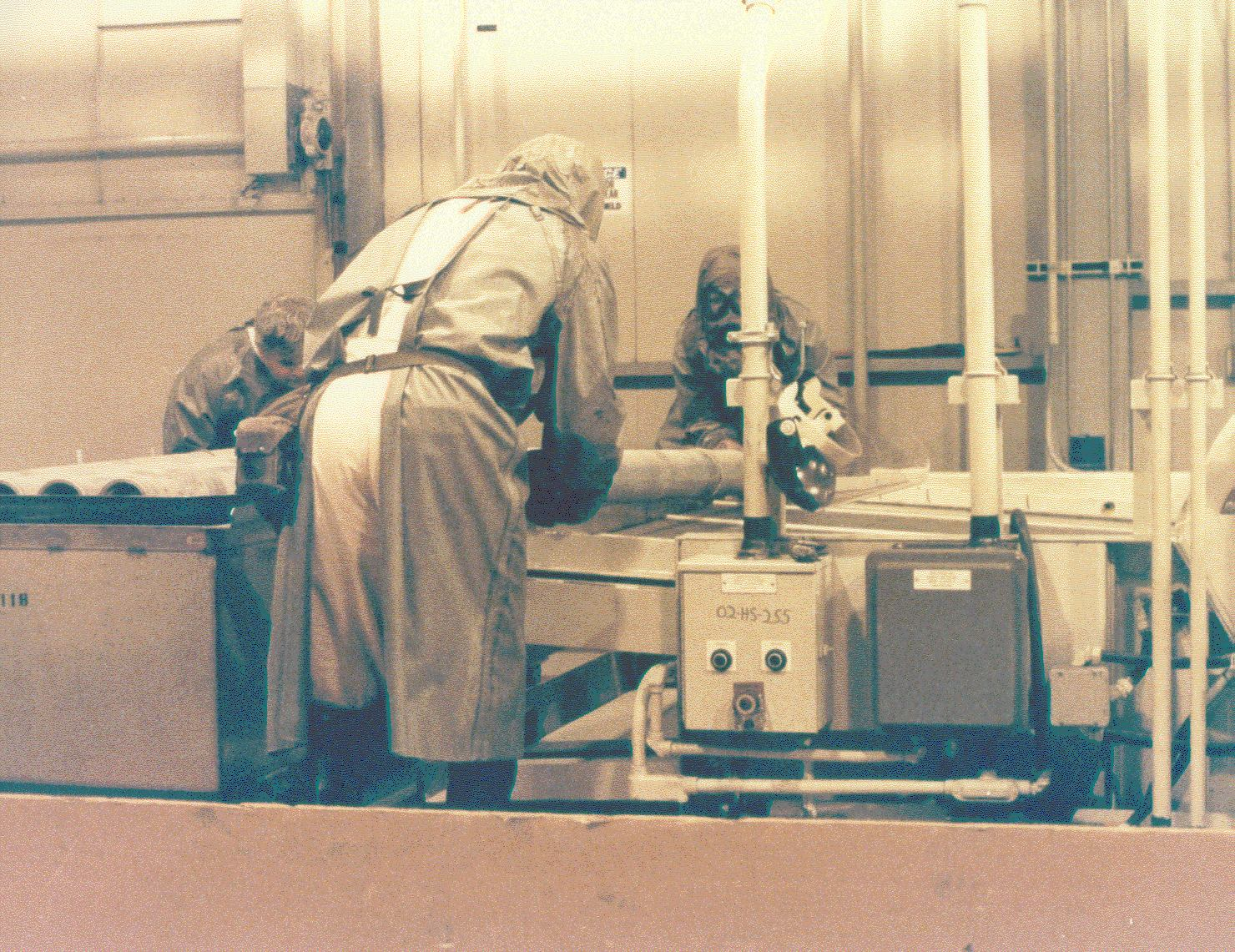
An M55 rocket containing Sarin being destroyed at Johnston Atoll in 1990

During the 1960s the Army stored many M55s at Black Hills Army Depot. The M55 was also stored at the Rocky Mountain Arsenal and in Okinawa, Japan. The rockets in Japan were moved to Johnston Atoll during Operation Red Hat where they were destroyed during the 1990s.

=== Disposal issues ===
Disposal operations for the M55 are made more difficult because of the rocket's design. The rocket propellant was a double base composition nitroglycerin (NG) and nitrocellulose (NC) propellant. Besides the NG and NC, M28 contains 2-nitrodiphenylamine (NDPA) as a stabilizer. The rocket propellant cannot be removed from the warhead without cutting open the rocket.

The propellant itself presents a hazard, because it becomes unstable as it ages. Specifically, the danger of autoignition is present as the stabilizer ages and becomes depleted. The U.S. National Research Council and other sources called the M55 the most dangerous weapon in the American chemical arsenal because of this and other hazards.

Another danger is agent leakage. Army reports have indicated that nerve agent GB can corrode the metal casings of the munitions over time. As Sarin decomposes it forms acids which can corrode the aluminum casings found around the agent in the M55. M55 rockets containing GB have accounted for the majority of leaking American chemical weapons. In mid-2002, over 4,000 munitions in the U.S. chemical stockpile were found to be leaking agent; of that number 2,102 were Sarin-containing M55s.

=== Disposal completion ===
The United States signed the Chemical Weapons Convention in 1993, which obligated it to destroy all chemical weapons by an extended deadline of April 2012. The U.S. missed the deadline, but completed the destruction of all declared chemical weapons on July 7, 2023, at Blue Grass Army Depot in Kentucky. The final chemical weapon to be destroyed was a sarin nerve agent-filled M55 rocket.

== Specifications ==
The M55 is 78 inches (2,000 mm) long and 4.44 inches (113 mm) in diameter. The 57-pound (26 kg) weapons can hold warheads filled with about 10 pounds (4.5 kg) of GB or VX. The warhead comprises about 15 pounds (6.8 kg) total, and consists of several components. The M34 and M36 Burster utilize composition B or tetrytol and total about 3 pounds (1.4 kg) of the total weapon weight. The agent, as stated, comprises about ten pounds (4.5 kilograms) of the weight with the rest lying in the casing and M417 fuze.

== See also ==
- Binary chemical weapons
- Anniston Chemical Activity
- Johnston Atoll Chemical Agent Disposal System
- List of U.S. Army Rocket Launchers By Model Number (M91)
