= Deseret Chemical Depot =

Former chemical weapons depot in Utah operated by the United States Army

Coordinates: 40°17′52″N 112°20′36″W

The Deseret Chemical Depot (/ˌdɛzəˈrɛt/) was a U.S. Army chemical weapon storage area located in Utah, 60 miles (100 km) southwest of Salt Lake City. It is related to the Tooele Chemical Agent Disposal Facility.

== History ==
The area was used to store chemical weapons between 1942 and 2012 with weapons destruction beginning in August 1996 at the Depot which held, at that time, 45% of the total U.S. stockpile. After initial demilitarization operations concerning the Weteye bomb concluded a total of 888 of those bombs were left in storage at Rocky Mountain Arsenal. After rounds of protests from residents of Utah, the state's governor, and legal action, the munitions were transferred to what was then known as Tooele Army Depot South Area. The first transfer of Weteyes took place in August 1981 and the moves continued for three weeks. After these transfers the South Area became known as Deseret Chemical Depot.

== Disposal operations ==
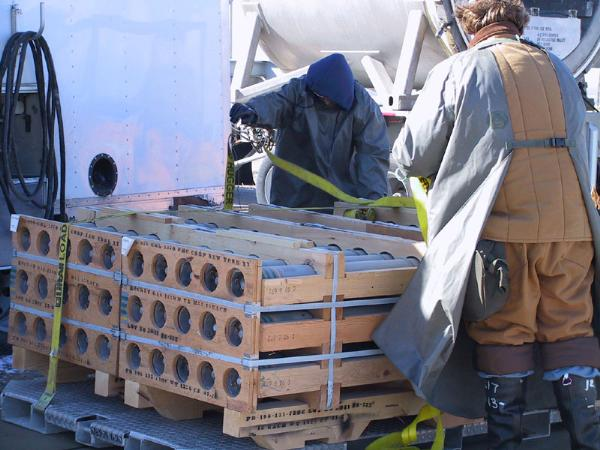
A pallet of M55 VX Nerve Agent-filled Rockets are prepared for transport from DCD's chemical agent storage area to the nearby Tooele Chemical Agent Disposal Facility for destruction

As of January 2007, 7,593 tons (6,888 metric tons) of chemical weapons have been destroyed using incineration. All sarin (GB) was destroyed by March 2002 and all VX by June 2005. In 2006, the facility was changed-over to handle destruction of mustard gas in ton-sized containers. By March 15, 2009, 3,216 ton containers and 54,453 projectiles of mustard gas had been destroyed (51.5% of Deseret's mustard agent stockpile). The last explosively configured mustard gas munition was reported destroyed in May 2010. All tabun (GA) was destroyed by November 10, 2011. All disposal operations concluded January 21, 2012.

== Unknown intruder ==
At 9:24 AM UTC-07, September 5, 2002, officials at the depot triggered the Terrorist Alert Warning System in response to an unidentified intruder being spotted just inside the 7-foot barbed wire fencing at Cemetery Ridge, a mile north of the incinerator

It was the first time that the alarm, which alerts employees to possible terror threats, had been sounded since new security measures were instituted after 9/11. As soon as the alert was sounded, area schools were notified of a possible terror threat. Due to the proximity of the date of the intrusion to the September 11th attacks the year before, security was even higher than normal, and it was initially reported to KSL-TV in Salt Lake City, Utah that units from the 1st Battalion, 145th Field Artillery Regiment, a part of the Utah National Guard, had the intruder surrounded.

Army officials later stated that the black-clad trespasser, sighted by four different soldiers during two different patrols, immediately ran off towards Ophir Creek, escaping capture, according to the depot Commander, Col. Peter C. Cooper. Despite the immediate setting up of roadblocks and a combined search by Army units and helicopters, no trace of the intruder was found. The search was suspended at approximately 8 PM that evening. When asked why the intruder could have escaped capture, Wade Mathews of the Tooele County emergency management noted, "There's a lot of foliage out there." Ophir Creek is lined with willows, he said.

Depot spokeswoman Alaine Southworth states it was impossible to know if the "intruder" actually was someone from the depot who was in the wrong area, but everyone on the depot was accounted for after the warning. Additionally, she noted that they were not sure how the intruder gained access to the perimeter, as the fence had not been cut, and no vehicle had been found to aid the intruder in their escape. Col. Cooper emphasized that the intruder was not in the area where chemical weapons were stored, but "unsettling questions remain" about his intentions, as there was no evidence of anything being stolen or that terrorism was in fact involved.

== Base closure ==
During the 2005 Defense Base Closure and Realignment Commission (BRAC), Deseret Chemical Depot was recommended for closure if it was determined that it could not be used in the future for the demilitarization of conventional weapons. In such a case, supplies contained at the depot would be transferred to nearby Tooele Army Depot. Deseret Chemical Depot officially closed July 11, 2013; however, it is unclear whether or not the hundreds of government employees and contractors employed at the time have transferred to other bases.

== See also ==
- Deseret Test Center
- Tooele Army Depot
- U.S. Army Chemical Materials Agency
- Whiffs
