= M60 105 mm projectile =

Chemical agent containing US Artillery shell

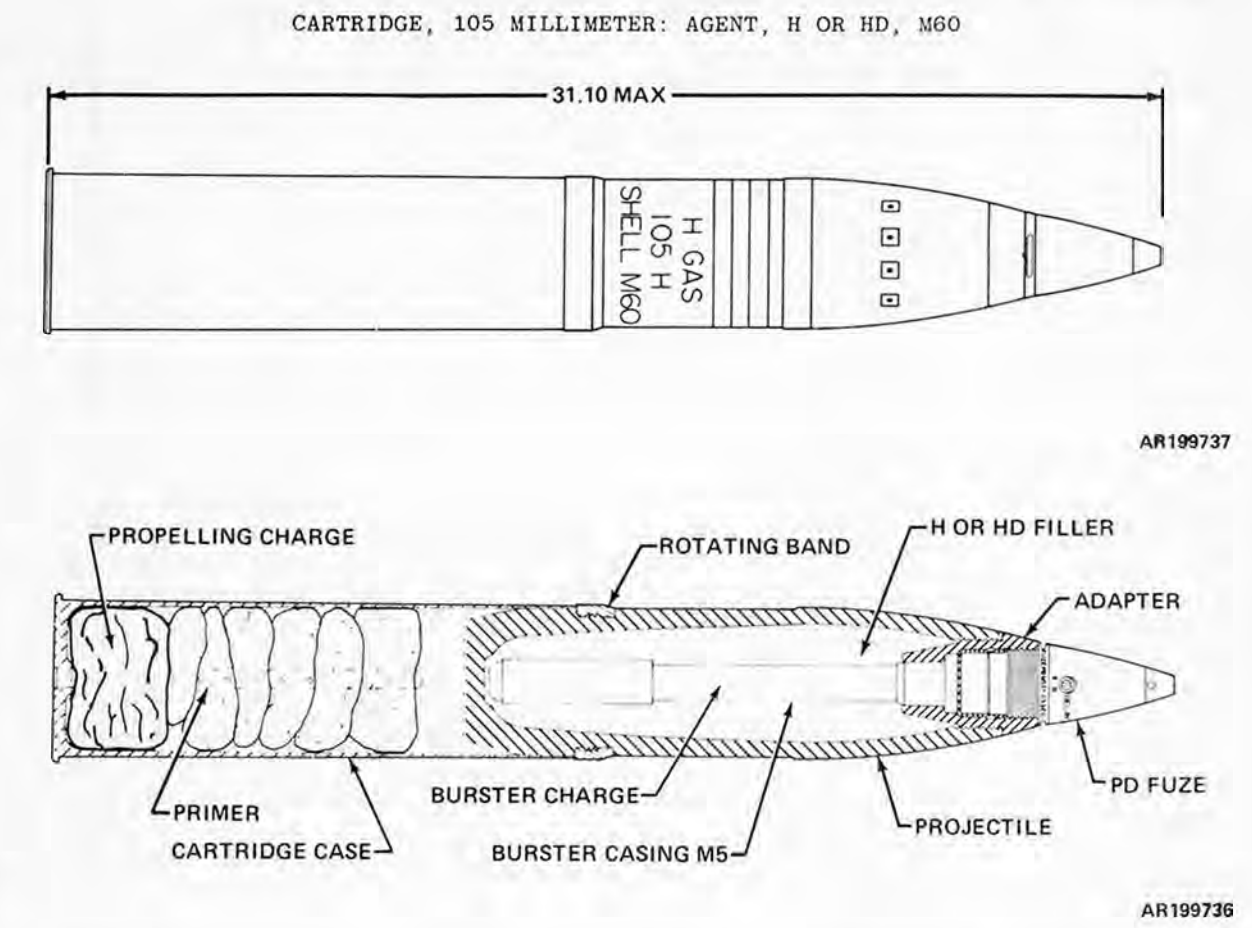

The M60 105 mm howitzer cartridge is a U.S. artillery shell that carried a chemical agent, specifically one of the sulfur mustard agents.
