= Umatilla Chemical Depot =

U.S. Army installation that stored chemical weapons

Coordinates: 45°50′35″N 119°26′17″W

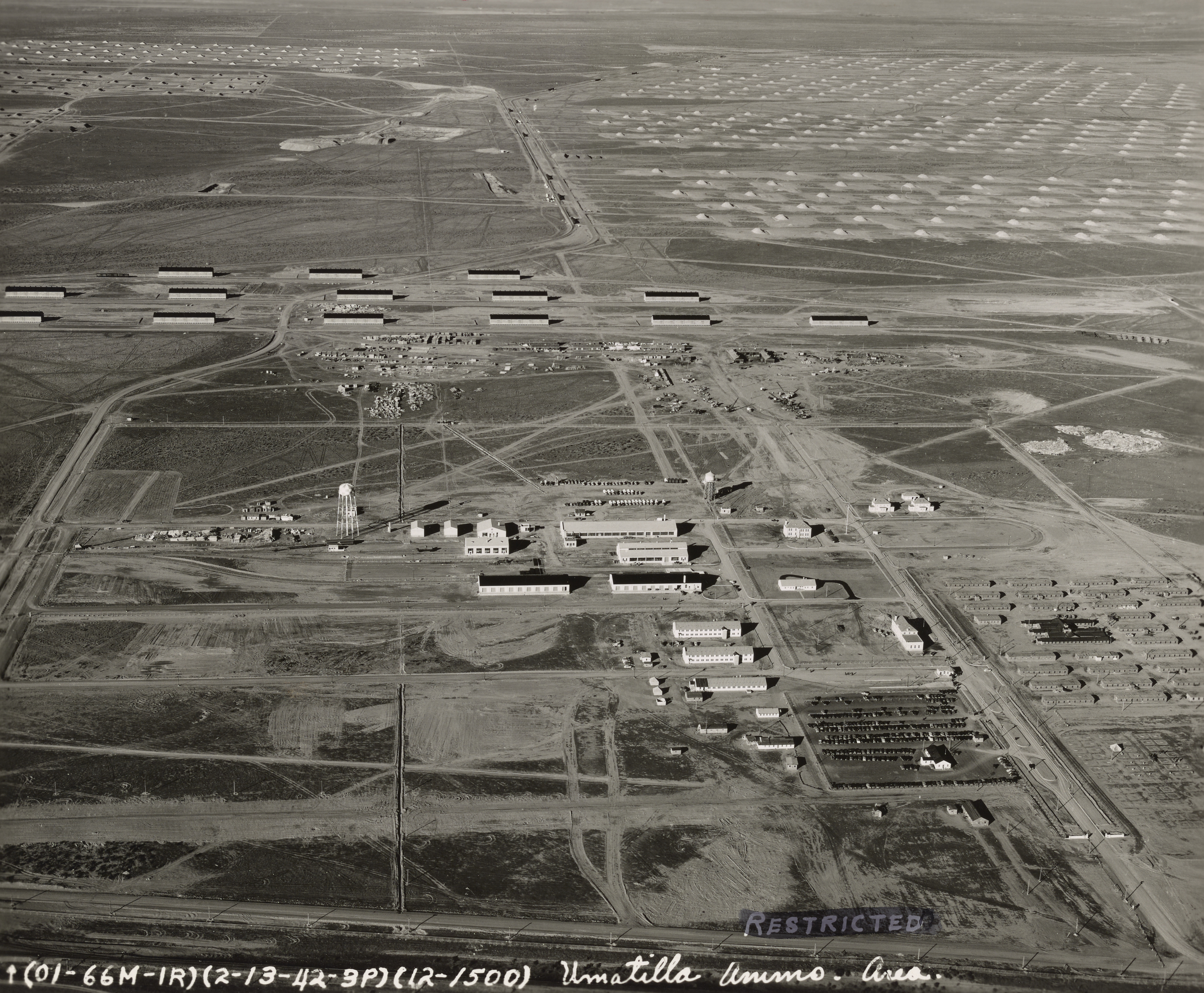
Umatilla Chemical Depot, 1942

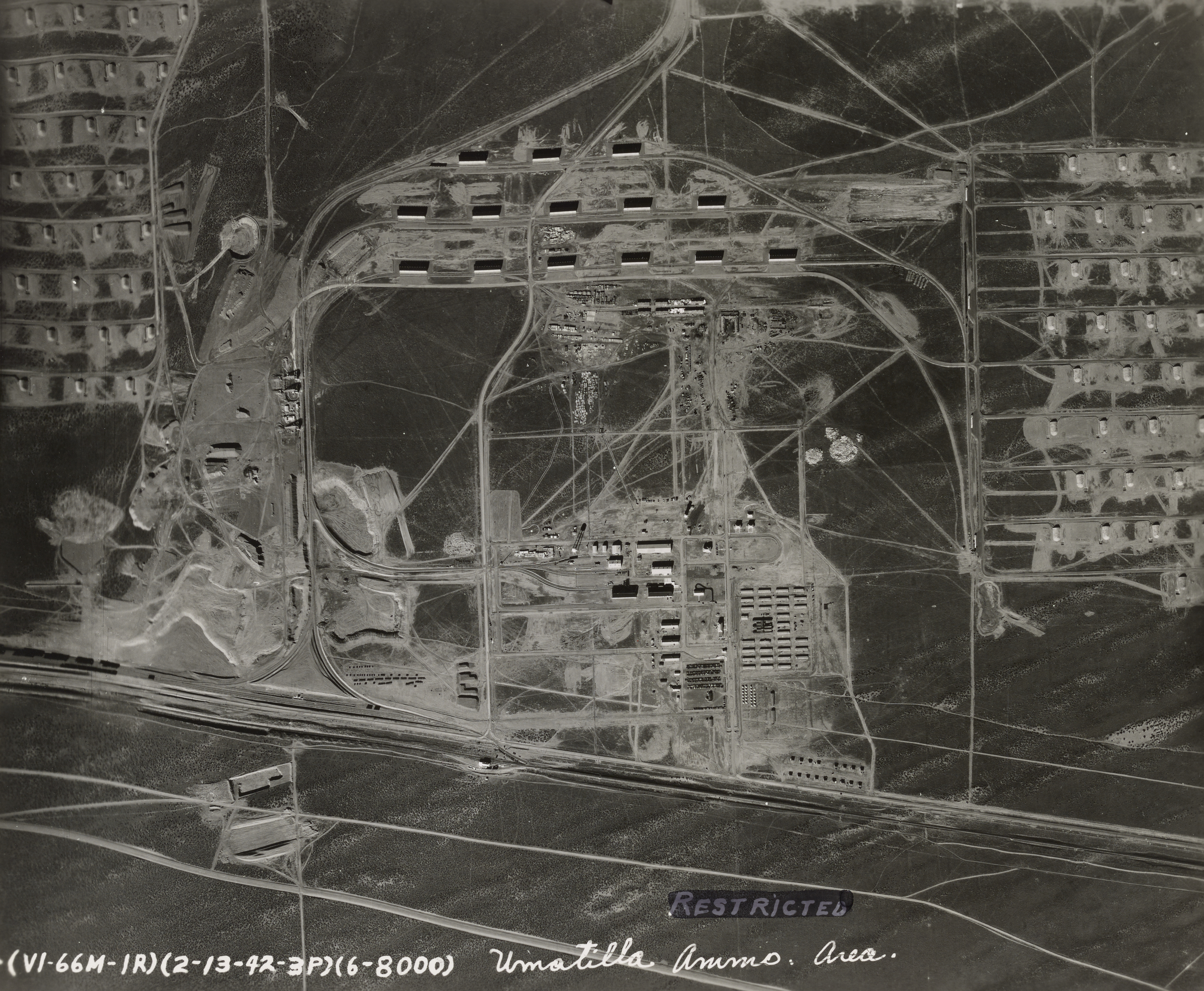
Umatilla Chemical Depot, 1942

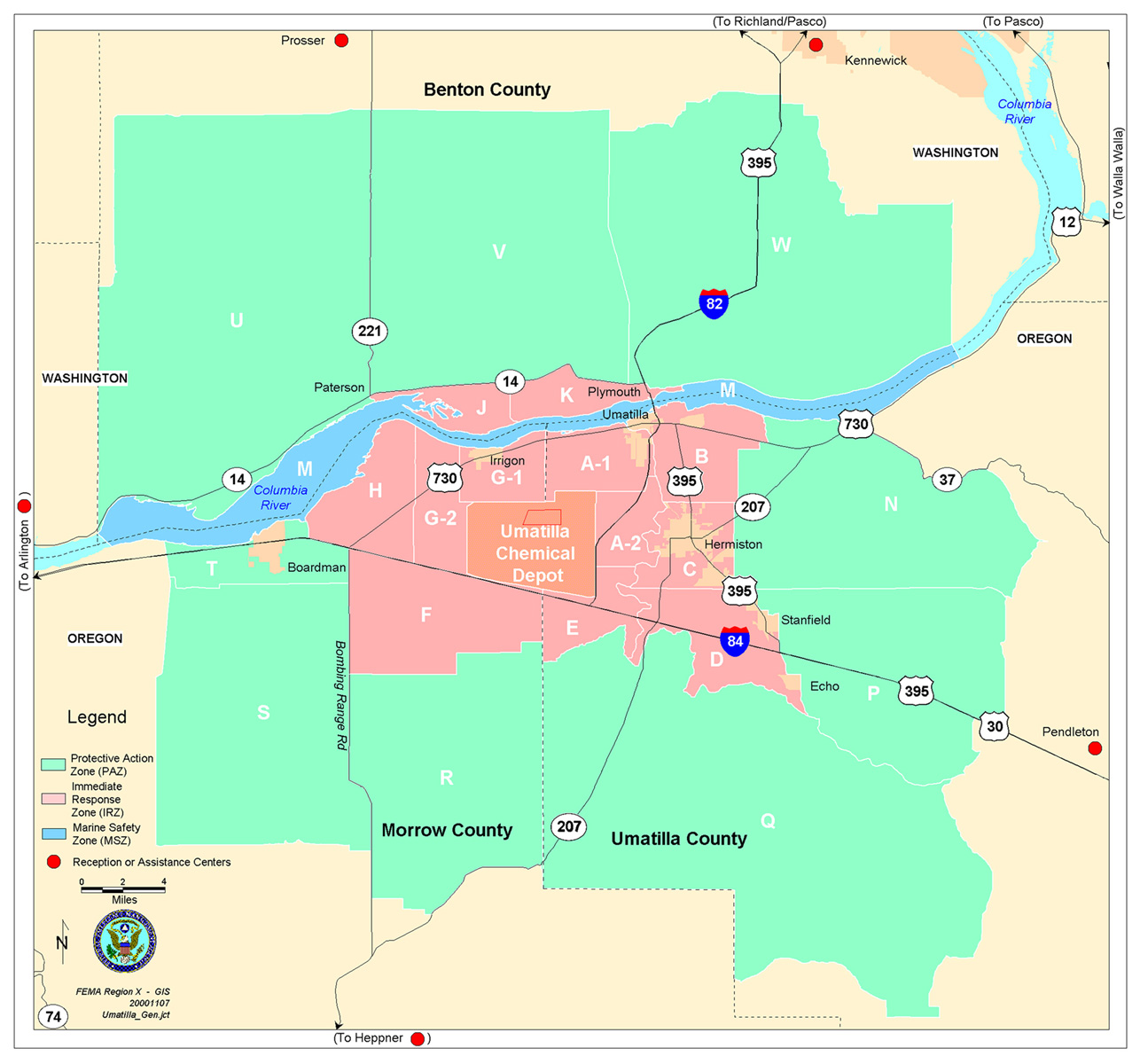
UCD Map with emergency accident zones

The Umatilla Chemical Depot (UMCD), based in Umatilla, Oregon, was a U.S. Army installation in the United States that stored chemical weapons. The chemical weapons originally stored at the depot consisted of various live munitions and storage containers each holding 1 short ton (2,000 lb; 910 kg) of GB, VX nerve agents or HD blister agent. All munitions had been safely destroyed by 2011 and base closure operations were still ongoing as of 2022.

== History ==
The Umatilla Ordnance Depot (later the Umatilla Army Depot) opened in 1941, to prepare for World War II. The depot's mission was to store and maintain a variety of military items, from blankets to ammunition. The depot took on its chemical weapons storage mission in 1962 and stored 12% of the nation's stockpile. From 1990 to 1994, the facility reorganized in preparation for eventual closure, shipping all conventional ammunition and supplies to other installations.

== Chemical weapons destruction facility ==
The Umatilla Chemical Agent Disposal Facility is designed for the destruction of the chemical weapons stored at the Umatilla Chemical Depot. The facility was completed in 2001. The Army began weapons disposal on September 8, 2004, and completed disposal on October 25, 2011. Destruction is a requirement under the Chemical Weapons Convention and monitored by the OPCW. The facility destroyed 220,604 munitions and containers containing 3,717 short tons (7,434,000 lb; 3,372,000 kg) of GB, HD and VX via high-temperature incineration, representing 100 percent of the base's stockpile. While destroying 50% of its stockpile took six years (until August 2010), the processing of the second 50% was expected to take only two years. The process is simplified by having only 1 short ton (2,000 lb; 910 kg) containers of HD remaining to be processed while multiple kinds of individual munitions containing several agents were destroyed early in the campaign. An emphasis on risk reduction prioritised destruction of the most modern and dangerous compounds (VX and GB) and destruction of smaller containers, which had greater risk of theft, explosion, and leakage.

=== Public participation and outreach ===
The Oregon Citizens' Advisory Commission, whose members include area residents appointed by the Governor, is a focal point for public participation in the Army's weapons storage and disposal program in Umatilla.

== Closure and redevelopment ==
Dismantling of the chemical disposal facility began in August 2013, and the base was expected to be transferred for state and private use by early 2015. The timeline was pushed back by the Columbia Development Authority, first to 2016 and then to 2017 and into 2018, due to complications during cleanup. After the planned decommissioning and transfer of land in 2018, the Oregon Military Department plans to use part of the base for a training facility, while the rest becomes industrial land and a wildlife refuge.

In late 2011, 49 of the 69 off-site sirens surrounding the depot were removed and have been repurposed as tsunami sirens along the Oregon Coast. Tillamook County would receive 30 sirens but never use them, while Clatsop County would receive 19 sirens, with Cannon Beach installing several of the former sirens to replace ones that had run their time.

== See also ==
- Chemical Weapons Convention
- Lethal Unitary Chemical Agents and Munitions
- Ordnance, Oregon
- Tooele Army Depot
