= Japan and weapons of mass destruction =

Aspect of Japan's military history

Japan
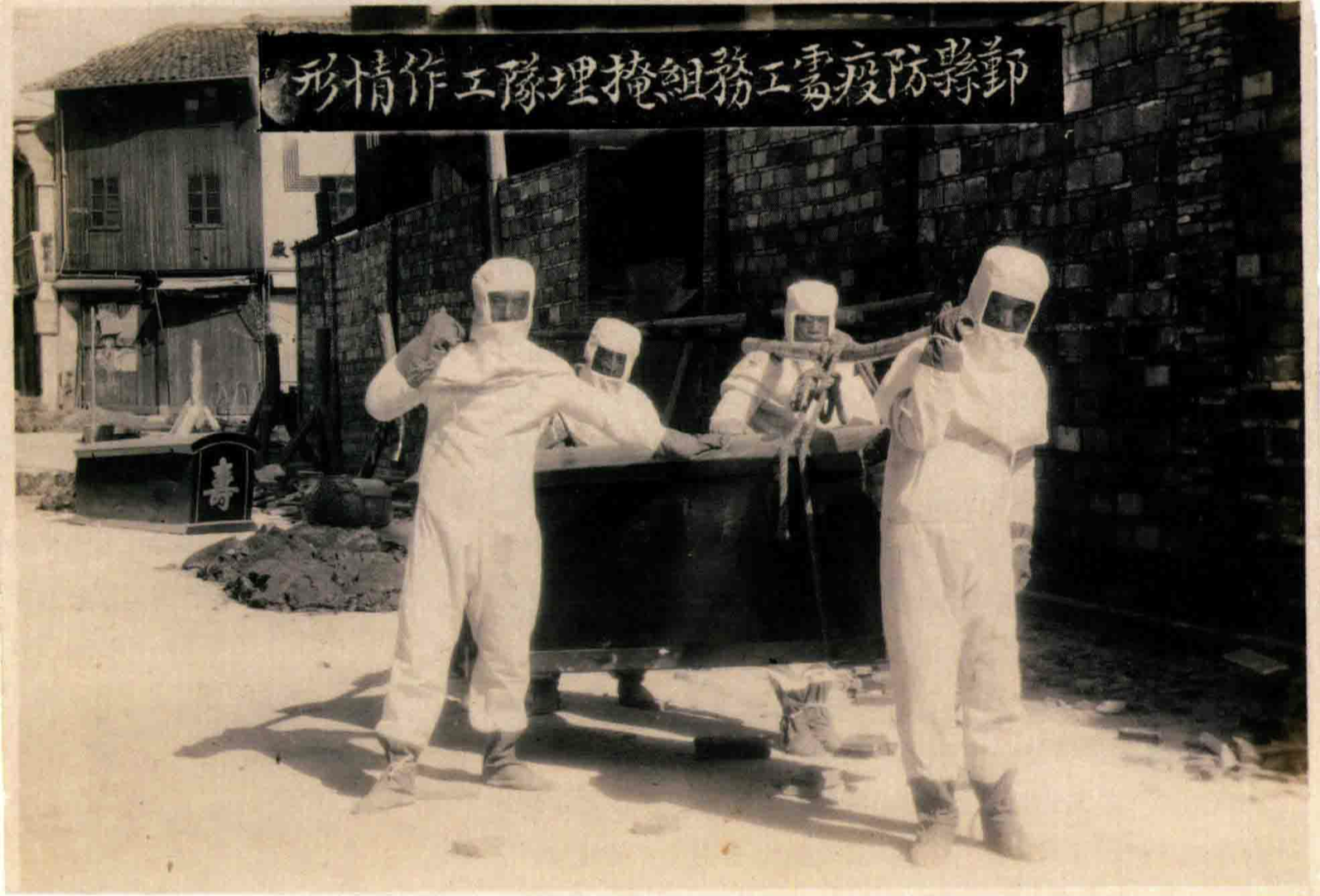
- Chinese workers wearing hazmat suits bury a victim of the Ningbo plague attack, 1940. The Empire of Japan's Unit 731 led this biological warfare in the Second Sino-Japanese War.

- Nuclear program start date: April 1941
- Nuclear program end date: 21 July 1945
- Total tests: 0
- Peak stockpile: 0
- NPT party: Yes
- Nuclear weapons stationing start date: 1954
- Nuclear weapons stationing provider: United States
- Peak nuclear weapons stationed: 1,300
- Nuclear weapons stationing end date: 1972

The Empire of Japan extensively used and researched chemical and biological weapons (CBW) during the Second Sino-Japanese War as part of Japanese war crimes. Japan is the only country ever attacked with nuclear weapons, by the United States' 1945 atomic bombings of Hiroshima and Nagasaki at the end of World War II. During the Cold War, the United States stationed chemical and nuclear weapons in Japan from the early 1950s to early 1970s. Postwar Japan ratified the Nuclear Non-Proliferation Treaty, Biological Weapons Convention, and Chemical Weapons Convention. The US provides a nuclear umbrella to Japan.

Beginning in the mid-1930s, Japan conducted numerous attempts to acquire, develop and use weapons of mass destruction. Japan's biological warfare is estimated to have killed between 200,000 and 500,000 people in China. Biological warfare units, led by Unit 731, operated across the Japanese colonial empire, dispersing anthrax, cholera, dysentery, typhoid, plague, and others. In the Japanese puppet state of Manchukuo, Unit 731 and Unit 516 were centers of CBW research, including human experimentation. CBW was used at the Battle of Changde, the Battle of Wuhan, the Ningbo plague attack, and elsewhere. The Imperial Japanese Navy planned a weaponized plague attack against California. Unit 731 members provided information to the Soviet and United States biological weapons programs, twelve of whom were found guilty in the Khabarovsk war crimes trials. From 1940 to 1945, Japan conducted a nuclear weapons program which did not progress past laboratory experiments. The US covered up Japan's biological warfare, and the Japanese government first acknowledged the program in 2002.

The US atomic bombings, the culmination of the Manhattan Project, devastated Hiroshima and Nagasaki, killing between 150,000 and 246,000 people within four months. The ethics and role of the attacks in the unconditional surrender of Japan and end of the Pacific War are the subject of continued debate. The attacks had a strong influence on Cold War's nuclear arms race and in popular culture.

From 1954 until 1972, the US stationed a range of strategic and tactical nuclear weapons, especially in the US-administered Ryukyu Islands. These included nuclear tactical ballistic missiles, cruise missiles, artillery, anti-air, anti-submarine weapons, and strategic bombers. Following the 1954 US Castle Bravo thermonuclear test, one Japanese fisherman died when all 23 crew aboard the Daigo Fukuryū Maru suffered acute radiation syndrome. The US stockpiled thousands of tons of chemical weapons in Okinawa, including mustard gas, sarin, and VX, which were removed in 1971.

Article 9 of the Constitution of Japan has been interpreted to prohibit the country from weapons of mass destruction and long-range delivery systems. Under the Three Non-Nuclear Principles established in 1971, Japan rejects possessing, producing, and introducing into its territory nuclear weapons. However, postwar Japan is an exemplar of nuclear latency: possessing the materials and technical capacity for an indigenous nuclear weapons program. This includes an advanced civil nuclear program, reprocessing, and stockpile of plutonium. Some 21st century politicians have supported a role for US nuclear weapons in Japan.

The Japanese religious cult Aum Shinrikiyo carried out the first chemical terrorist attacks to use nerve agents. Members perpetrated at least 10 such attacks, notably using sarin in Matsumoto in 1994 and on the Tokyo subway in 1995, as well as some of the first attacks to use VX. The group also unsuccessfully attempted bioterrorist attacks with anthrax and botulinum toxin, which remains the most extensive non-state biological weapons program to date.

== Japanese possession of weapons of mass destruction ==
=== Biological weapons ===
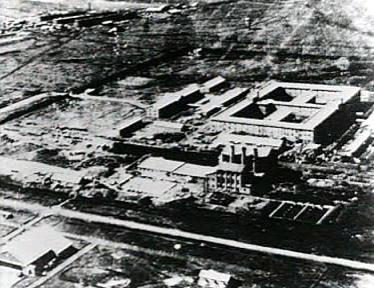
Ping Fan Facility of Japanese Army Unit 731, Pingfang District, Manchuria during World War II

The Empire of Japan's use of biological weapons in the Second Sino-Japanese War is estimated to have killed between 200,000 and 500,000 people, almost entirely in China. Following research and production at its biological warfare units led by Unit 731, Japanese forces dispersed anthrax, cholera, dysentry, glanders, typhoid, and plague via airplane-dropped bombs containing infected fleas, a form of entomological warfare. Shirō Ishii, the leader of Unit 731, carried out two major anti-civilian campaigns. The first from 1940 to 1942 dispersed plague-infected fleas in port cities in northern China. The second in 1943 used anthrax and glanders against villages southwest of Shanghai.

==== Attacks in China ====
Japan became interested in obtaining biological weapons during the early 1930s. Following the international ban on germ warfare in interstate conflicts by the 1925 Geneva Protocol, Japan reasoned that disease epidemics make effective weapons. Japan developed new methods of biological warfare (BW) and used them on a large scale in China. During the Sino-Japanese War and World War II, Unit 731 and other Special Research Units of the Imperial Japanese Army conducted human experimentation on thousands, mostly Chinese, Korean, Russian, and other nationalities, mainly across Asia (Taiwanese, Vietnamese, Cambodians, Filipinos, etc.), as well as some American, British and Dutch POWs and Japanese criminals.

In military campaigns, the Japanese army used biological weapons on Chinese soldiers and civilians. Shirō Ishii, the leader of Unit 731, carried out two major anti-civilian campaigns. The first from 1940 to 1942 dispersed plague-infected fleas in port cities in northern China. The second in 1943 used anthrax and glanders against villages southwest of Shanghai. This was in retaliation for their assistance to US pilots of the 1942 Doolittle Raid, the first US air raid against Honshu.

Unit 731 used plague-infected fleas and flies covered with cholera to infect the population in China. The Japanese military dispersed insects by spraying them from low-flying airplanes and dropping ceramic bombs they had developed that were filled with mixtures containing insects and diseases that could affect humans, animals, and crops. Recent additional firsthand accounts testify the Japanese infected civilians through the distribution of plague-infested foodstuffs, such as dumplings and vegetables. During the Changde chemical weapon attacks, the Japanese also employed biological warfare by intentionally spreading infected fleas. In Zhejiang, anthrax, cholera, dysentery, and typhoid were employed. Harbin also suffered Japanese biological attacks. Other battles include the Kaimingye germ weapon attack in Ningbo.

==== Planned attacks against U.S. forces and mainland ====
Japan sent a submarine with unspecified biological weapons early in 1944 to defend the island of Saipan from American invasion; however the submarine was sunk.

Another attack against American troops with biological weapons was planned for the invasion of Iwo Jima. The plan involved towing gliders laden with pathogens over the American lines. However, this plan never took shape. Had it succeeded, thousands of American soldiers and marines may have died, and the operation as a whole may very well have failed.

Japan's biowarfare experts had hoped to launch biological attacks on the U.S. in 1944 with balloon bombs filled with bubonic plague, anthrax, rinderpest, and smut fungus. A 1945-planned kamikaze attack on San Diego with I-400-class submarine aircraft carriers that would deploy Aichi M6As floatplanes and drop fleas infected with bubonic plague was code-named Operation Cherry Blossoms at Night. The plans were rejected by Hideki Tojo who feared similar retaliation by the United States.

==== Postwar legacy ====
Japanese scientists from Unit 731 provided research information for the United States biological weapons program in order to escape war crimes and crimes against humanity charges. Researchers arrested by Soviet forces were tried at the December 1949 Khabarovsk war crimes trials; they were given light sentences to the Siberian labor camp, from 2 to 25 years, seemingly in exchange for the information they held. Bob Dohini, a former war crimes prosecution team lawyer, recently claimed that there was no mention of germ warfare in the investigation of Japanese war crimes. The fact was not well known until the 1980s. Japan's emperor was unable to be tried. Later revelations indicated his knowledge of the program.

Japan's employment of BW was largely viewed as ineffective, due to the absence of efficient production or delivery technology. The U.S. government provided a stipend to the Japanese BW military scientists and researches. Japanese biological warfare information provided to U.S. authorities after World War II remained a secret and was eventually returned to Japan.

Right-wing Japanese officials have claimed that no proof of Japan's wartime atrocities exists.

In August 2002, a Japanese court ended decades of official denials and acknowledged, for the first time, that Japan had used germ warfare in occupied China in the 1930s and 1940s. The court acknowledged the existence of Japan's biological warfare program but rejected the plaintiffs' demands for compensation, saying the issue was covered under postwar treaties. Following the court decision, Japanese officials announced that their government would send a delegation to China to excavate and remove hundreds of abandoned chemical weapons, including bombs, shells, and containers of mustard gas and other toxins left over from the Second World War.

Japan's biological warfare experts and scientists from WWII, were alleged to have assisted the US in employment of BW in the Korean War.

=== Chemical weapons ===
==== Pre-Second Sino-Japanese War ====
In 1927, the Imperial Japanese Army appropriate Ōkunoshima island, and constructed its primary chemical weapons production facility there. Its position in the Seto Inland Sea and small circumference of four kilometers, allowed for safety and secrecy, with the nearest city three kilometers away near Takehara, Hiroshima. In 1929, the Okunoshima site began producing tear and mustard gases. At peak capacity, Okunoshima produced per month approximately 200 tons of mustard gas, 50 tons of lewisite (also a blister agent), 80 tons of diphenylcyanoarsine (a vomiting agent), 50 tons of hydrogen cyanide (a blood agent), and 2.5 tons of chloroacetophenone (a more toxic riot control agent).

In the 1930 Musha Incident, Japan's army air corps in Taiwan ordered bombing runs over Musha to smoke out the rebels of the Seediq indigenous people, dropping mustard gas bombs in what was allegedly the first such use of chemical warfare in Asia. (Note: Meitetsu Haruyama says that instead of mustard gas, hundreds of rounds of tear gas and at least three rounds of a special gas (a combination of cyanide and tear gas) were used. However, it is unclear whether it had any effect or not.)

A Chemical Warfare School was established at Narashino, Chiba, in 1933, training both the Imperial Japanese Army and Navy. According to a US military intelligence report, Narashino was "splendidly equipped, well staffed, and effective in the fulfillment of its mission until the end of the war," and graduated 3074 officers between 1939 and 1945. All Japanese troops and a large number of reservists received gas warfare defense training. However, Japan ultimately lacked a separate, independent chemical warfare division (similar to the US Chemical Warfare Service, which US intelligence later blamed for a "failure to develop an integrated, balanced and coordinated program" leading to only a "limited tactical capability” with chemical weapons.

==== Second Sino-Japanese War ====
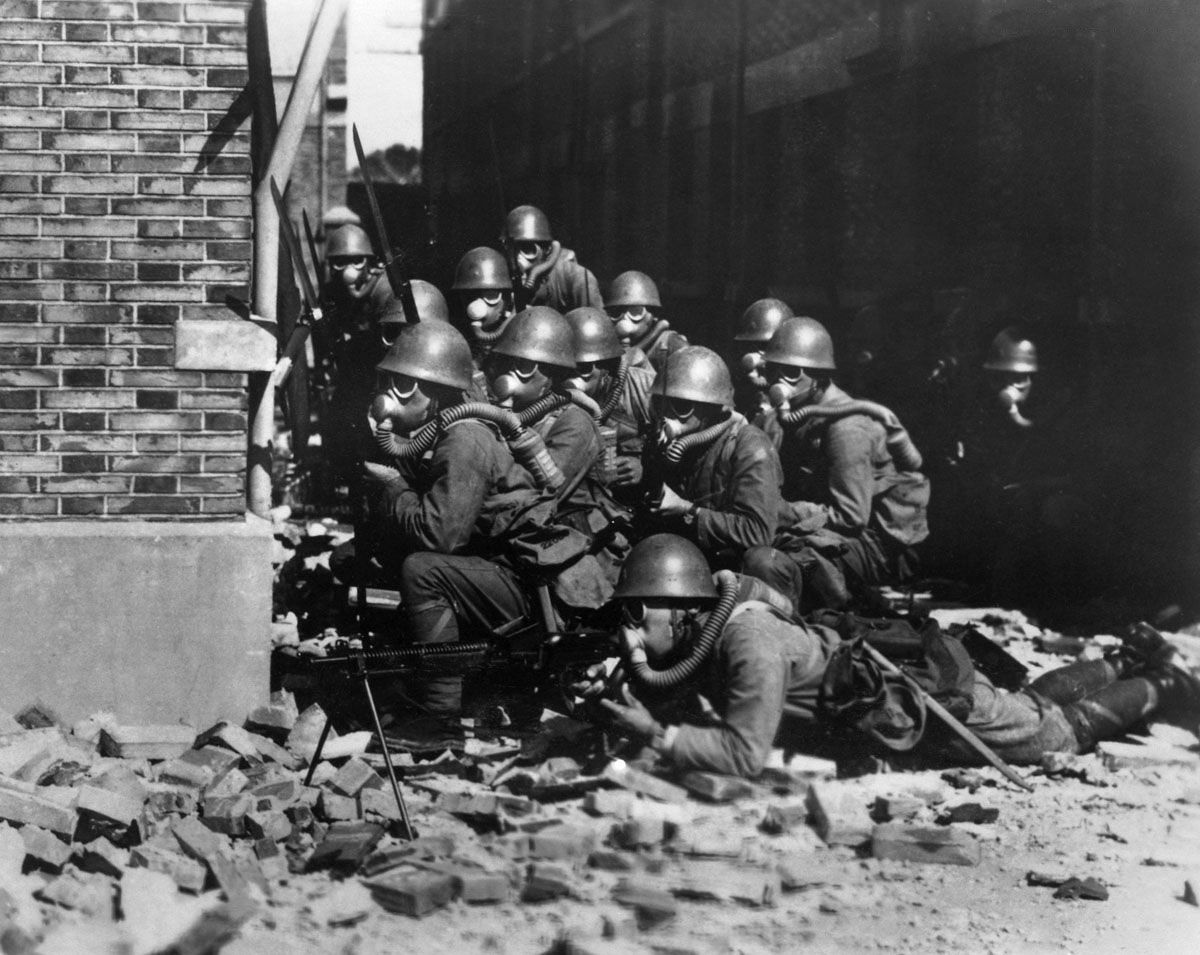
Japanese Special Naval Landing Force wearing gas masks and rubber gloves during a chemical attack near Chapei in the Battle of Shanghai

Despite the 1899 Hague Declaration, 1907 Hague Convention, and a resolution adopted against Japan by the League of Nations on May 14, 1938 all prohibiting chemical weapon use, the Imperial Japanese Army frequently carried out chemical attacks in the Second Sino-Japanese War. Because of fear of retaliation, however, those weapons were never used against Westerners, but against other Asians judged "inferior" by imperial propaganda. According to historians Yoshiaki Yoshimi and Kentaro Awaya, gas weapons, such as tear gas, were used only sporadically in 1937 but in early 1938, the Imperial Japanese Army began full-scale use of sneeze and nausea gas (red), and from mid-1939, used mustard gas (yellow) against troops of both the Kuomintang and the Chinese Communist Party's Eighth Route Army and New Fourth Army.

According to historians Yoshiaki Yoshimi and Seiya Matsuno, the chemical weapons were authorized by specific orders given by Emperor Hirohito himself, transmitted by the chief of staff of the army. For example, the Emperor authorized the use of toxic gas on 375 separate occasions during the Battle of Wuhan from August to October 1938. They were also profusely used during the invasion of Changde. Those orders were transmitted either by Prince Kan'in Kotohito or General Hajime Sugiyama. The Imperial Japanese Army had used mustard gas and the US-developed (CWS-1918) blister agent lewisite against Chinese troops and guerrillas. Experiments involving chemical weapons were conducted on live prisoners (Unit 731 and Unit 516).

The Japanese also carried chemical weapons as they swept through Southeast Asia towards Australia. Some of these items were captured and analyzed by the Allies. Historian Geoff Plunkett has recorded how Australia covertly imported 1,000,000 chemical weapons from the United Kingdom from 1942 onwards and stored them in many storage depots around the country, including three tunnels in the Blue Mountains to the west of Sydney. They were to be used as a retaliatory measure if the Japanese first used chemical weapons. Buried chemical weapons have been recovered at Marrangaroo and Columboola.

The Japanese used mustard gas and the blister agent Lewisite against Chinese troops and guerillas in China, amongst others during the Changde chemical weapon attack. Experiments involving chemical weapons were conducted on live prisoners (Unit 516).

===== US threats of retaliation =====
US President Franklin D. Roosevelt first condemned Japanese chemical warfare in China in 1938. In June 1942, following US entry into the war, Roosevelt threatened "retaliation in kind" if "Japan persists in this inhuman form of warfare against China or against any other of the United Nations". In April 1943, threatened "retaliation with overwhelming force" if any Axis powers initiated chemical warfare.

Scholar Walter Grunden argued these US threats seem to have limited Japanese chemical warfare in China, pointing to interrogations of Japanese leaders including Hideki Tojo recounting their awareness of US threats, and a summer 1944 army order to withdraw chemical munitions to the rear echelon positions. Grunden also argued the US could theoretically have used chemical weapons against Japan, as the US ratification of the 1925 Geneva Protocol contained a reservation allowing for chemical warfare against states already conducting chemical warfare.

==== Postwar ====
Japan's chemical warfare experts and scientists from WWII, were alleged to have assisted the US in employment of chemical warfare in the Korean War.

Aum Shinrikyo, a Japanese new religious movement and doomsday cult, carried out multiple fatal chemical terrorist attacks, as well as attempted bioterrorist attacks, and preliminary interest in nuclear terrorism during the 1990s. Aum's chemical attacks remain the most significant by a violent non-state actor (VNSA). The 1994 Matsumoto sarin attack and 1995 Tokyo subway sarin attack were the first lethal non-state actor attacks to use nerve agents, and the group also carried out the first known attacks using VX nerve agent in 1994 assassination attempts.

Japan had signed the Chemical Weapons Convention in December 1993. Japan ratified The Chemical Weapons Convention in 1995 and was thus a state party upon it entering into force in 1997.

The 2002 Tokyo court acknowledgement of Japanese biological warfare prompted Japanese officials to announce a delegation would be sent to China to excavate and remove hundreds of abandoned chemical weapons, including bombs, shells, and containers of mustard gas and other toxins left over from the Second World War. As of 2005, sixty years after the end of the war, canisters that were abandoned by Japan in their hasty retreat are still being dug up in construction sites, causing injuries and allegedly even deaths.

=== Nuclear weapons ===
==== Wartime program ====
A Japanese program to develop nuclear weapons was conducted during World War II. Like the German nuclear weapons program, it suffered from an array of problems, and was ultimately unable to progress beyond the laboratory stage before the atomic bombings of Hiroshima and Nagasaki and the Japanese surrender in August 1945. The Imperial Japanese Army's fission project in Tokyo at Riken did not formally begin until April 1941 when Takeo Yasuda acted on Army Minister Hideki Tōjō's order to investigate the possibilities of nuclear weapons. A second fission project under the Imperial Japanese Navy at Kyoto Imperial University ran from May 1943, until both were terminated on 21 July 1945.

==== Postwar status ====
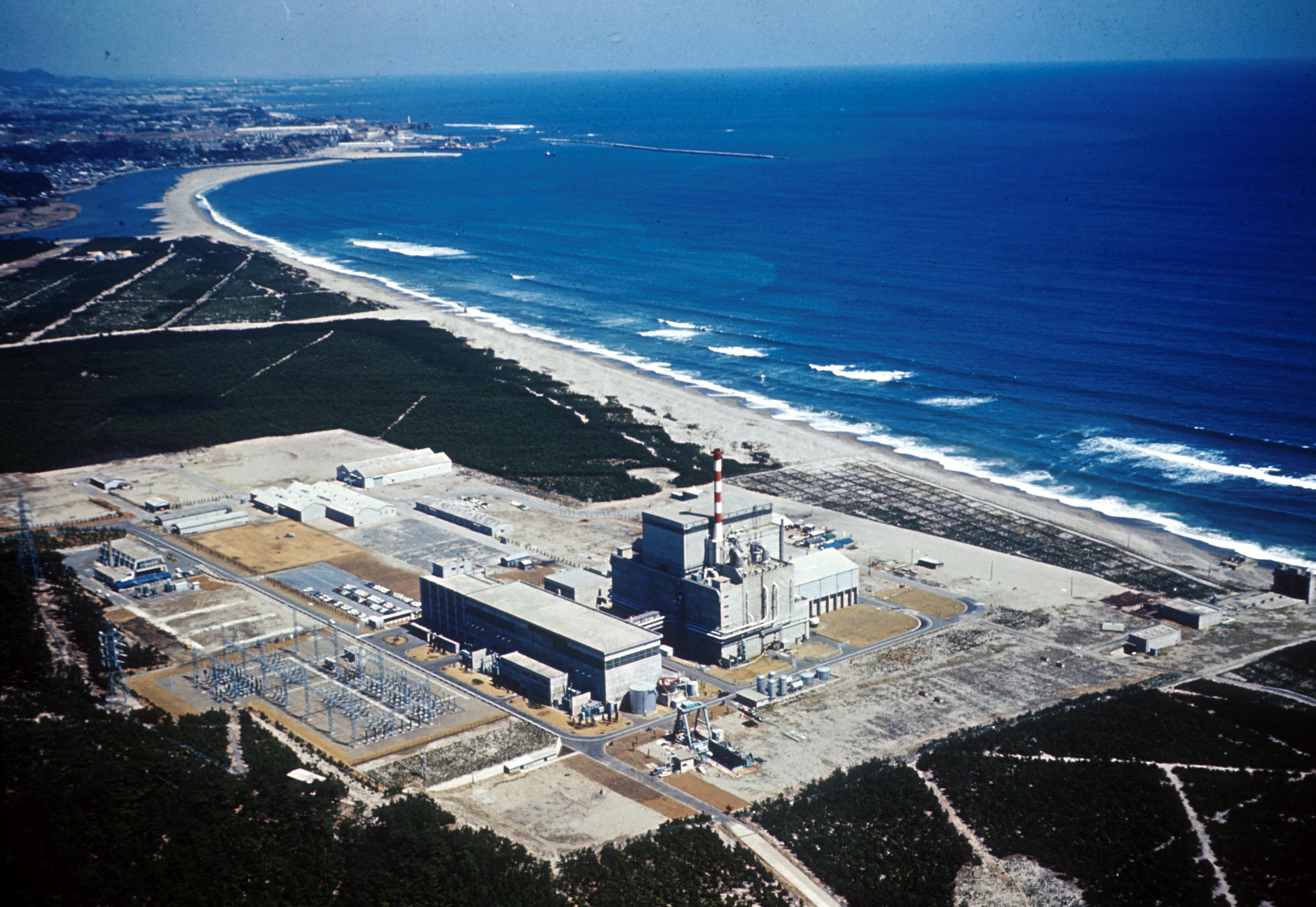
The first nuclear reprocessing plant in Japan, yielding separated plutonium, was at Tōkai Nuclear Power Plant, operating from 1977 to 2006.

The postwar Constitution forbids the establishment of offensive military forces, but not nuclear weapons explicitly. In 1967 it adopted the Three Non-Nuclear Principles, ruling out the production, possession, or introduction of nuclear weapons. Japan signed the Treaty on the Non-Proliferation of Nuclear Weapons in February 1970.

Scholars have argued that Japan has the technology, raw materials, and capital to produce nuclear weapons within one year if necessary, and some analysts consider it a de facto nuclear state for this reason. For this reason Japan is often said to be a "screwdriver's turn" away from possessing nuclear weapons. In 2023, former US Secretary of State Henry Kissinger claimed Japan was "heading towards becoming a nuclear power in five years", and that Japan did not intend to be a permanent member of the global multilateral system. A 2025 South China Morning Post article quoted one Chinese nuclear expert who claimed there was speculation that Japan has already manufactured two nuclear bombs.

During the 2016 U.S. presidential election it was proposed by GOP candidates to allow both Japan and the Republic of Korea to develop nuclear weapons to counter a North Korean missile threat.

===== Dual-use resources =====
Japan has the world's largest fifth largest stockpile of separated plutonium, and the largest among non-nuclear-armed states, behind Russia, the UK, France, and the US. As of 2025, Japan has about 44.4 tonnes of this plutonium, of which only 8.6 tonnes is stored domestically, with the remainder held in France and the UK. In 2026, the People's Liberation Army Daily claimed this plutonium could be used to manufacture 5,500 nuclear warheads. In 2025, Nagasaki University's RECNA (Research Center for Nuclear Weapons Abolition) Fissile Material Data Monitoring Team similarly assessed that Japan had 44.5 tonnes of plutonium, but that this could manufacture 7,417 nuclear bombs. The first nuclear reprocessing plant in Japan, yielding separated plutonium, was at Tōkai Nuclear Power Plant, operating from 1977 to 2006.

For research, South China Morning Post in 2025 noted Japan's Fugaku, the world's seventh most powerful supercomputer as of April 2026, as capable of nuclear explosion simulation, and the GEKKO XII laser facility as capable of inertial confinement fusion, both of which advance nuclear weapon design understanding, and are used for this purpose in the stockpile stewardship programs of nuclear-armed states.

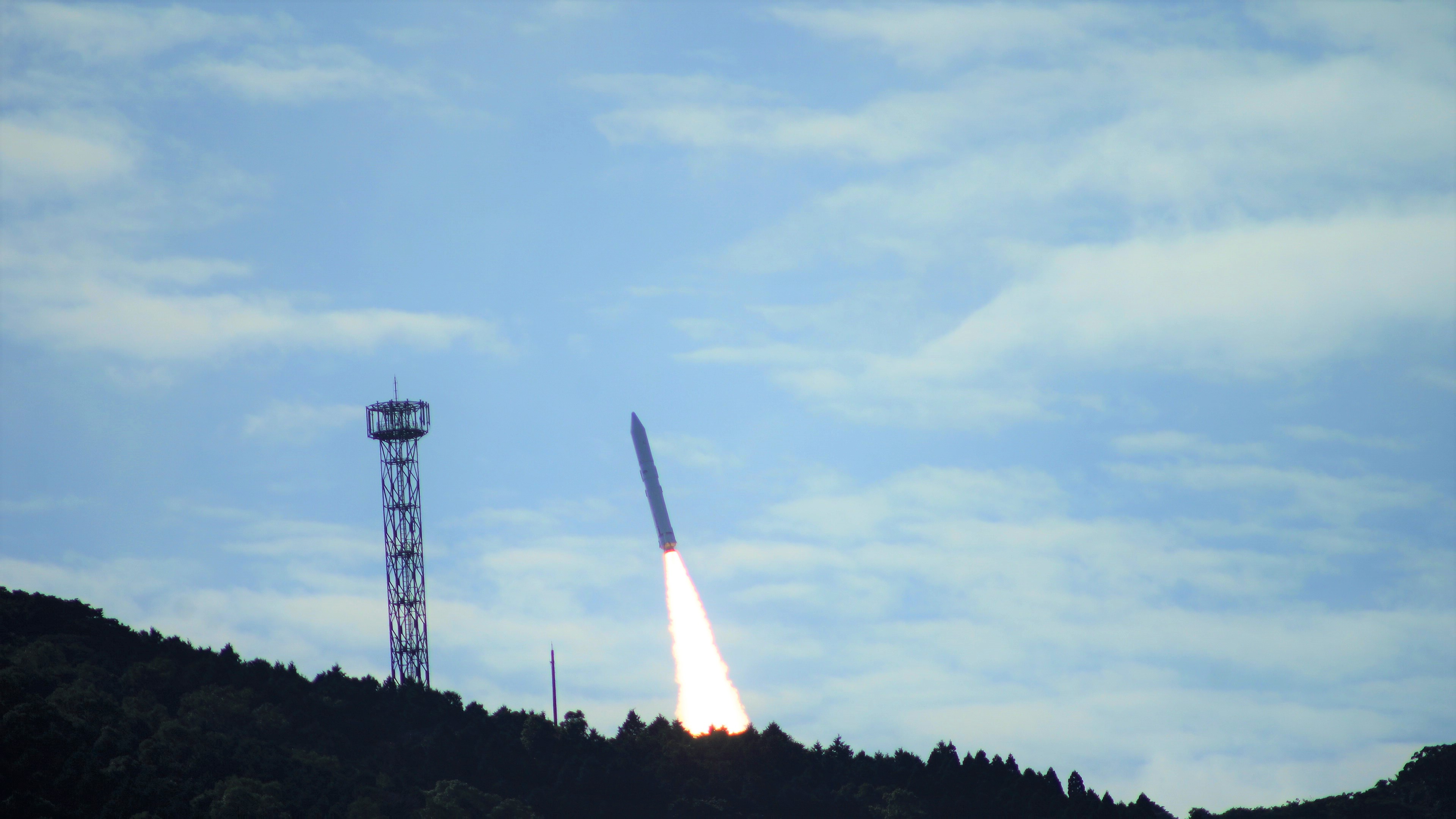
Launch of Japan's Epsilon space launch vehicle in 2021. Nuclear experts have argued its use of solid propellant makes it more suitable to carrying nuclear weapons.

For delivery, SCMP noted Japan's Epsilon space launch vehicle is more suited to conversion to use in long-range nuclear strikes, as it uses solid-propellant, more typical to intercontinental ballistic missiles and providing faster response times, rather than liquid-propellant, and can deliver a 1.2 tonne payload to orbit. SCMP argued the guidance system would require adaptation. The article also listed Japan's Type 12 surface-to-ship and US-procured Tomahawk cruise missiles, as potentially dual-usable for arming with nuclear warheads, with 1,000 km and 1,600 km ranges respectively.

=== Delivery systems ===
Solid fuel rockets are the design of choice for military applications as they can remain in storage for long periods, and then reliably launch at short notice.

Lawmakers made national security arguments for keeping Japan's solid-fuel rocket technology alive after ISAS was merged into the Japan Aerospace Exploration Agency, which also has the H-IIA liquid-fueled rocket, in 2003. The ISAS director of external affairs, Yasunori Matogawa, said, "It seems the hard-line national security proponents in parliament are increasing their influence, and they aren't getting much criticism…I think we’re moving into a very dangerous period. When you consider the current environment and the threat from North Korea, it’s scary."

Toshiyuki Shikata, a government adviser and former lieutenant general, indicated that part of the rationale for the fifth M-V Hayabusa mission was that the reentry and landing of its return capsule demonstrated "that Japan's ballistic missile capability is credible."

At a technical level the M-V design could be weaponized quickly (as an Intercontinental ballistic missile) although this would be politically unlikely.

In response to the perceived threat from North Korean-launched ballistic missiles, Japanese government officials have proposed developing a first strike capability for Japan's military that includes ballistic and cruise missiles.

== North Korean weapons of mass destruction and Japan ==
The threat of North Korea-based ballistic missiles that are within range of Japan have guided Japanese and U.S. defense and deterrence strategies.

== South Korean weapons of mass destruction and Japan ==
South Korean interest in developing an atomic bomb began in 1950. The interest was partially a result of the rapid surrender of Korea's then-enemy Japan following use of atomic bombs in World War II. Post-war aggression from the North and from the People's Republic of China solidified that interest. A South Korean nuclear facility began to reprocess fuel and enrich plutonium based on the observation that Japan was also producing it.

In late 1958, nuclear weapons were deployed by the U.S. from Kadena Air Base in Okinawa to Kunsan Air Base in South Korea in order to oppose military actions by the People's Republic of China during the Second Taiwan Strait Crisis.

== U.S. weapons of mass destruction and Japan ==
Okinawa has long been viewed as a stepping-stone to force open the remainder of Japan and Asia. Commodore Perry's gunboat diplomacy expedition to open Japan to U.S. trade began in Okinawa in 1852.

By the early 1950s and the outbreak of the Korean War, Okinawa was seen as America's Gibraltar of the Pacific.

=== U.S. biological weapons ===
In 1939, the U.S. State Department reported that a Japanese Army physician in New York City had attempted to obtain a Yellow fever virus sample from the Rockefeller Institute for Medical Research. The incident contributed to a sense of urgency in the United States to research a BW capability. By 1942 George W. Merck, president of Merck and Company, was made chairman of the War Research Service which was established to oversee the U.S. development of BW-related technology at Camp Detrick.

After World War II ended, a U.S. War Departments report notes that "in addition to the results of human experimentation much data is available from the Japanese experiments on animals and food crops". The technical information of Japan's BW program participants was transferred into U.S. intelligence agencies and BW programs in exchange for immunity for war crimes charges.

==== Korean War allegations ====
In 1951, the first of many allegations were made against the United States by the communist belligerent nations in the Korean war of employing biological warfare using various techniques in attacks launched from bases on Okinawa.

==== U.S. anti-plant biological weapons research ====
In 1945 Japan's rice crop was terribly affected by rice blast disease. The outbreak as well as another in Germany's potato crop coincided with covert Allied research in these areas. The timing of these outbreaks generated persistent speculation of some connection between the events however the rumors were never proven and the outbreaks could have been naturally occurring.

Sheldon H. Harris in Factories of Death: Japanese Biological Warfare, 1932–1945, and the American Cover Up wrote:

This was at least one year prior to the creation of Project 112. The Okinawa anti-crop research project may lend some insight to the larger projects Project 112 sponsored. BW experts in Okinawa and "at several sites in the Midwest and South" conducted in 1961 "field tests" for wheat rust and rice blast disease. These tests met with "partial success" in the gathering of data, and led, therefore, to a significant increase in research dollars in fiscal year 1962 to conduct additional research in these areas. The money was devoted largely to developing "technical advice on the conduct of defoliation and anti-crop activities in Southeast Asia."

==== U.S. anti-plant chemical agents research ====
During the Second World War limited test use of aerial spray delivery systems was employed only on several Japanese-controlled tropical islands to demarcate points for navigation and to kill dense island foliage. Despite the availability of the spray equipment, herbicide application with aerial chemical delivery systems were not systematically implemented in the Pacific theater during the war.

At the close of World War Two, the U.S. planned to attack Japan's food supply with anti-crop chemical agents and by July 1945 had stockpiled an amount of chemicals "sufficient to destroy one-tenth of the rice crop of Japan." However, logistical problems would have reduced that estimate.

In addition to work done in the anti-crop theater during the Cold War, the screening program for chemical defoliants was greatly accelerated. By the end of fiscal year 1962, the Chemical Corps had let or were negotiating contracts for over one thousand chemical defoliants. "The Okinawa tests evidently were fruitful." The presence of so-called rainbow herbicides such as Agent Orange has been widely reported on Okinawa as well as at other locations in Japan. The U.S. government disputes these assertions and the issues surrounding the subject of military use anti-plant agents in Japan during the 1950s through the 1970s remains a controversy.

==== Arthropod vector research ====
At Kadena Air Force Base, an Entomology Branch of the U.S. Army Preventive Medicine Activity, U.S. Army Medical Center was used to grow "medically important" arthropods, including many strains of mosquitoes in a study of disease vector efficiency. The program reportedly supported a research program studying taxonomic and ecological data surveys for the Smithsonian Institution." The Smithsonian Institution and The National Academy of Sciences and National Research Council administered special research projects in the Pacific. The Far East Section of the Office of the Foreign Secretary administered two such projects which focused "on the flora of Okinawa" and "trapping of airborne insects and arthropods for the study of the natural dispersal of insects and arthropods over the ocean." The motivation for civilian research programs of this nature was questioned when it was learned that such international research was in fact funded by and provided to the U.S. Army as requirement related to the U.S. military's biological warfare research.

==== Weather modification research ====
Operation Pop Eye / Motorpool / Intermediary-Compatriot was a highly classified weather modification program in Southeast Asia during 1967-1972 that was developed from cloud seeding research conducted on Okinawa and other tropical locations. A report titled Rainmaking in SEASIA outlines use of silver iodide deployed by aircraft in a program that was developed in California at Naval Air Weapons Station China Lake. The technique was refined and tested in Okinawa, Guam, Philippines, Texas, and Florida in a hurricane study program called Project Stormfury.

The chemical weather modification program was conducted from Thailand over Cambodia, Laos, and Vietnam. The program was allegedly sponsored by Secretary of State Henry Kissinger and the Central Intelligence Agency without the authorization of Secretary of Defense Melvin Laird. Laird had categorically denied to Congress that a program for modification of the weather existed. The program employed cloud seeding as a weapon which was used to induce rain and extend the East Asian Monsoon season in support of U.S. government strategic efforts related to the War in Southeast Asia. The use of a military weather control program was related to the destruction of enemy food crops. Whether the use of a weather modification program was directly related to any of the chemical and biological warfare programs is not documented. However, it is certain that some of the military herbicides in use in Vietnam required rainfall to be absorbed.

In theory, any CBW program employing fungus spores or a mosquito vector would have also benefited from prolonged periods of rain. Rice blast sporulation on diseased leaves occurs when relative humidity approaches 100%. Laboratory measurements indicate sporulation increases with the length of time 100% relative humidity prevails. The Aedes aegypti mosquito lays eggs and requires standing water to reproduce. Approximately three days after it feeds on blood, the mosquito lays her eggs over a period of several days. The eggs are resistant to desiccation and can survive for periods of six or more months. When rain floods the eggs with water, the larvae hatch.

=== U.S. chemical weapons ===
U.S. chemical weapons in Japan were deployed to Okinawa in the early 1950s. The Red Hat mission deployed additional chemical agents in three military operations code named YBA, YBB, and YBF. The operation deployed chemical agents to the 267th Chemical Platoon on Okinawa during the early 1960s under Project 112. The shipments, according to declassified documents, included sarin, VX, and mustard gas. By 1969, according to later newspaper reports, there was an estimated 1.9 million kg (1,900 metric tons) of VX stored on Okinawa. The chemical weapons brought to Okinawa included nerve and blister agents contained in rockets, artillery shells, bombs, mines, and one-ton (900 kg) containers. The chemicals were stored at Chibana Ammunition Depot. The depot was a hill-top installation next to Kadena Air Base.

In 1969, over 20 servicemen (23 U.S. soldiers and one U.S. civilian, according to other reports) were exposed to low levels of the nerve agent sarin while sandblasting and repainting storage containers. The resultant publicity appears to have contributed to the decision to move the weapons off Okinawa. The U.S. then government directed relocation of chemical munitions. The chemical warfare agents were removed from Okinawa in 1971 during Operation Red Hat. Operation Red Hat involved the removal of chemical warfare munitions from Okinawa to Johnston Atoll in the Central Pacific Ocean. An official U.S. film on the mission says that 'safety was the primary concern during the operation,' though Japanese resentment of U.S. military activities on Okinawa also complicated the situation. At the technical level, time pressures imposed to complete the mission, the heat, and water rationing problems also complicated the planning.

The initial phase of Operation Red Hat involved the movement of chemical munitions from a depot storage site to Tengan Pier, eight miles away, and required 1,332 trailers in 148 convoys. The second phase of the operation moved the munitions to Johnston Atoll. The Army leased 41 acres (170,000 m^{2}) on Johnston. Phase I of the operation took place in January and moved 150 tons of distilled mustard agent. The USNS Lt. James E. Robinson (T-AK-274) arrived at Johnston Atoll with the first load of projectiles on January 13, 1971. Phase II completed cargo discharge to Johnston Atoll with five moves of the remaining 12,500 tons of munitions, in August and September 1971. Units operating under United States Army Ryukyu Islands (USARYIS) were 2nd Logistical Command and the 267th Chemical Company, the 5th and 196th Ordnance Detachments (EOD), and the 175th Ordnance Detachment.

Originally, it was planned that the munitions be moved to Umatilla Chemical Depot but this never happened due to public opposition and political pressure. The Congress passed legislation on January 12, 1971 (PL 91-672) that prohibited the transfer of nerve agent, mustard agent, Agent Orange and other chemical munitions to all 50 U.S. states. In 1985 the U.S. Congress mandated that all chemical weapons stockpiled at Johnston Atoll, mostly mustard gas, Sarin, and VX gas, be destroyed. Prior to the beginning of destruction operations, Johnston Atoll held about 6.6 percent of the entire U.S. stockpile of chemical weapons. The Johnston Atoll Chemical Agent Disposal System (JACADS) was built to destroy all the chemical munitions stored on Johnston island. The first weapon disposal incineration operation took place on June 30, 1990. The last munitions were destroyed in 2000.

=== U.S. nuclear weapons ===
The intensity of the fighting and the high number of casualties during the Battle of Okinawa formed the basis of the casualty estimates projected for the invasion of Japan that led to the decision to launch the atomic bombing of Japan. Atomic bombs were deployed in order to avoid having “an[nother] Okinawa from one end of Japan to the other.”

The atomic age on Japan's southern islands began during the final weeks of the war when the U.S. Army Air Force launched two atomic attacks on Hiroshima and Nagasaki from bases on Tinian in the Marianas Islands. Bockscar, the B-29 that dropped the Fat Man nuclear weapon on Nagasaki, landed at Yontan Airfield on Okinawa on August 9, 1945. The U.S. military immediately began constructing a second B-29 base and a facility for atom bomb processing in Okinawa to be completed in September 1945 that would open more targets in mainland Japan.

==== U.S. nuclear weapon atmospheric testing ====
Japanese naval warships captured by the U.S. after Japan's surrender in World War II, including the Nagato, were used as target ships and destroyed in 1946 in nuclear testing at Bikini Atoll during Operation Crossroads. The atomic testing was conducted in the Marshall Islands group that U.S. forces captured in early 1944 from the Japanese.

The first hydrogen bomb detonation, known as Castle Bravo, contaminated Japanese fisherman on the Daigo Fukuryū Maru with nuclear fallout on March 4, 1954. The incident further rallied a powerful anti-nuclear movement.

==== Nuclear weapons agreements ====
Article 9 of the Japanese Constitution, written by MacArthur immediately after the war, does not explicitly prohibit nuclear weapons. But when the U.S. military occupation of Japan ended in 1951, a new security treaty was signed that granted the United States rights to base its "land, sea, and air forces in and about Japan."

It is true that Chichi Jima, Iwo Jima, and Okinawa were under U.S. occupation, that the bombs stored on the mainland lacked their plutonium and/or uranium cores, and that the nuclear-armed ships were a legal inch away from Japanese soil. All in all, this elaborate strategem maintained the technicality that the United States had no nuclear weapons "in Japan."

In 1959, Prime Minister Nobusuke Kishi stated that Japan would neither develop nuclear weapons nor permit them on its territory". He instituted the Three Non-Nuclear Principles--"no production, no possession, and no introduction."

But when these non-nuclear principles were being enunciated, Japanese territory was already fully compromised, in spirit if not in letter. Although actual nuclear weapons were removed from Iwo Jima at the end of 1959, Chichi Jima, which had the same legal status, continued to house warheads with their nuclear materials until 1965. And Okinawa, of course, was chock-a-block full of nuclear weapons of all types until 1972. Nuclear-armed ships moored at U.S. Navy bases in Japan, and others called at Japanese ports without restriction...Yet, as compromised as it was, Japan's non-nuclear policy was not wholly fictitious. The Pentagon never commanded nuclear storage rights on the main islands, and it had to withdraw nuclear weapons from Okinawa in 1972...Undoubtedly, Japanese rulers firmly believed that the compromises they made with Washington were necessary for Japanese security during the dark days of the Cold War. Through it all, nonetheless, "non-nuclear Japan" was a sentiment, not a reality.

A 1960 accord with Japan permits the United States to move weapons of mass destruction through Japanese territory and allows American warships and submarines to carry nuclear weapons into Japan's ports and American aircraft to bring them in during landings. The discussion took place during negotiations in 1959, and the agreement was made in 1960 by Aiichiro Fujiyama, then Japan's Foreign Minister. "There were many things left unsaid; it was a very sophisticated negotiation. The Japanese are masters at understood and unspoken communication in which one is asked to draw inferences from what may not be articulated."

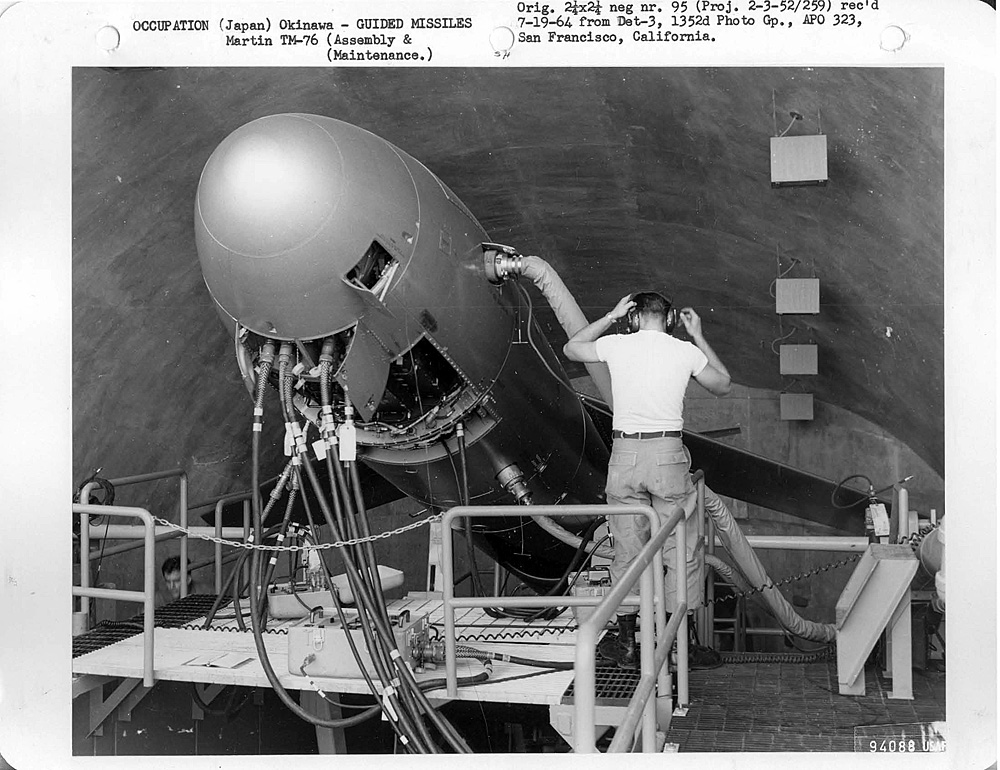
Technicians at work on a Mace B nuclear-armed cruise missile in a hard-site launcher on Okinawa in 1962.

The secret agreement was concluded without any Japanese text so that it could be plausibly denied in Japan. Since only the American officials recorded the oral agreement, not having the agreement recorded in Japanese allowed Japan's leaders to deny its existence without fear that someone would leak a document to prove them wrong. The arrangement also made it appear that the United States alone was responsible for the transit of nuclear munitions through Japan. However, the original agreement document turned up in 1969 during preparation for an updated agreement, when a memorandum was written by a group of U.S. officials from the National Security Council Staff; the Departments of State, Defense, Army, Commerce and Treasury; the Joint Chiefs of Staff; the Central Intelligence Agency; and the United States Information Agency.

A 1963 Central Intelligence Agency National Intelligence Estimate stated that: '...US bases in Japan and related problems of weapons and forces will continue to involve issues of great sensitivity in Japan-US relations. The government is bound to be responsive to the popular pressures which the left can whip up on these issues. We do not believe that this situation will lead to demands by any conservative government for evacuation of the bases.'

During the early parts of the Cold War the Bonin Islands including Chichi Jima, the Ryukyu Islands including Okinawa, and the Volcano Islands including Iwo Jima were retained under American control. The islands were among "thirteen separate locations in Japan that had nuclear weapons or components, or were earmarked to receive nuclear weapons in times of crisis or war." According to a former U.S. Air Force officer stationed on Iwo Jima, the island would have served as a recovery facility for bombers after they had dropped their bombs in the Soviet Union or China. War planners reasoned that bombers could return Iwo Jima, "where they would be refueled, reloaded, and readied to deliver a second salvo as an assumption was that the major U.S. Bases in Japan and the Pacific theater would be destroyed in a nuclear war." It was believed by war planners that a small base might evade destruction and be a safe harbor for surviving submarines to reload. Supplies to re-equip submarines as well as Anti-submarine weapons were stored within caves on Chichi Jima. The Johnson administration gradually realized that it would be forced to return Chichi Jima and Iwo Jima "to delay reversion of the more important Okinawa bases" however, President Johnson also wanted Japan's support for U.S. Military operations in Southeast Asia." The Bonin and Volcano islands were eventually returned to Japan in June 1968.

Prime Minister Eisaku Satō and Foreign Minister Takeo Miki had explained to the Japanese parliament that "the return of the Bonins had nothing to do with nuclear weapons yet the final agreement included a secret annex, and its exact wording remained classified." A December 30, 1968, cable from the U.S. embassy in Tokyo is titled "Bonin Agreement Nuclear Storage," but within the same file "the National Archives contains a 'withdrawal sheet' for an attached Tokyo cable dated April 10, 1968, titled 'Bonins Agreement--Secret Annex,'".

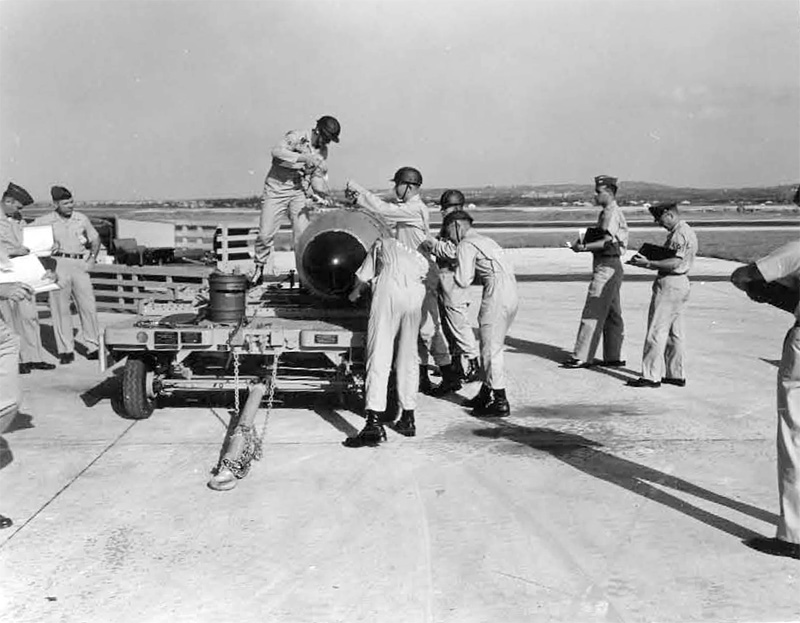
Mark 7 Atomic bomb being readied by the 8th Tactical Fighter Wing at Kadena Air Base

On the one year anniversary of the B-52 crash and explosion at Kadena Prime Minister Sato and President Nixon met in Washington, DC where several agreements including a revised Status of Forces Agreement (SOFA) and a formal policy related to the future deployment of nuclear weapons on Okinawa were reached.

A draft of the November 21st, 1969, Agreed Minute to Joint Communique of United States President Nixon and Japanese Prime Minister Sato was found in 1994. "The existence of this document has never been officially recognized by the Japanese or U.S. governments." The English text of the draft agreement reads:

United States President:

As stated in our Joint Communique, it is the intention of the United States Government to remove all the nuclear weapons from Okinawa by the time of actual reversion of the administrative rights to Japan; and thereafter the Treaty of Mutual Cooperation and Security and its related arrangements will apply to Okinawa, as described in the Joint Communique. However, in order to discharge effectively the international obligations assumed by the United States for the defense of countries in the Far East including Japan, in time of great emergency the United States Government will require the re-entry of nuclear weapons and transit rights in Okinawa with prior consultation with the Government of Japan. The United States Government would anticipate a favorable response. The United States Government also requires the standby retention and activation in time of great emergency of existing nuclear storage locations in Okinawa: Kadena, Naha, Henoko, and the Nike Hercules units...

Japanese Prime Minister:

The Government of Japan, appreciating the United States Government's requirements in time of great emergency stated above by the President, will meet these requirements without delay when such prior consultation takes place. The President and the Prime Minister agreed that this Minute, in duplicate, be kept each only in the offices of the President and the Prime Minister and be treated in the strictest confidence between only the President of the United States and the Prime Minister of Japan.

==== Alleged nuclear weapons incidents on Okinawa ====
Complete information surrounding U.S. nuclear accidents is not generally available via official channels. News of accidents on the island usually did not reach much farther than the islands local news, protest groups, eyewitnesses and rumor mills. However, the incidents that were publicized garnered international opposition to chemical and nuclear weapons and set the stage for the 1971 Okinawa Reversion Agreement to officially ending the U.S. military occupation on Okinawa.

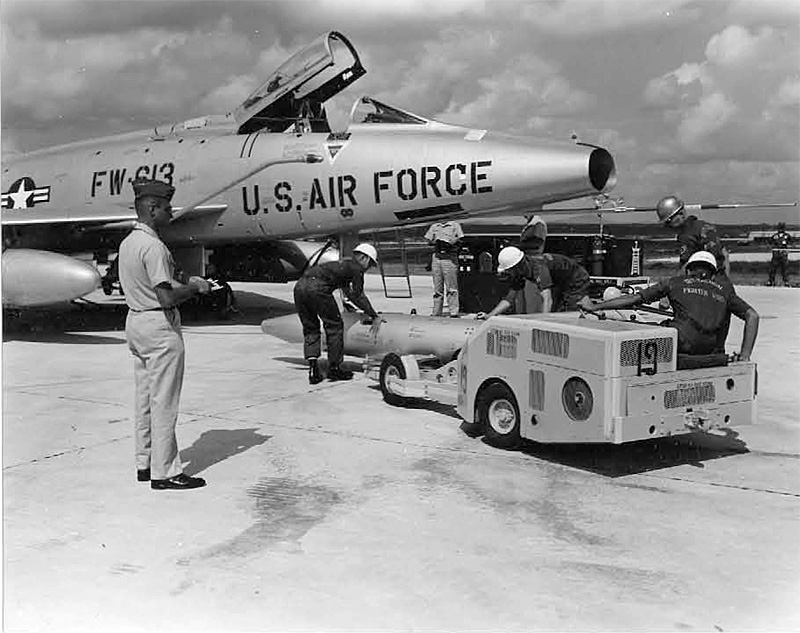
Mark 28 atomic bomb being transported to an F-100 by the 18th Tactical Fighter Wing on Okinawa

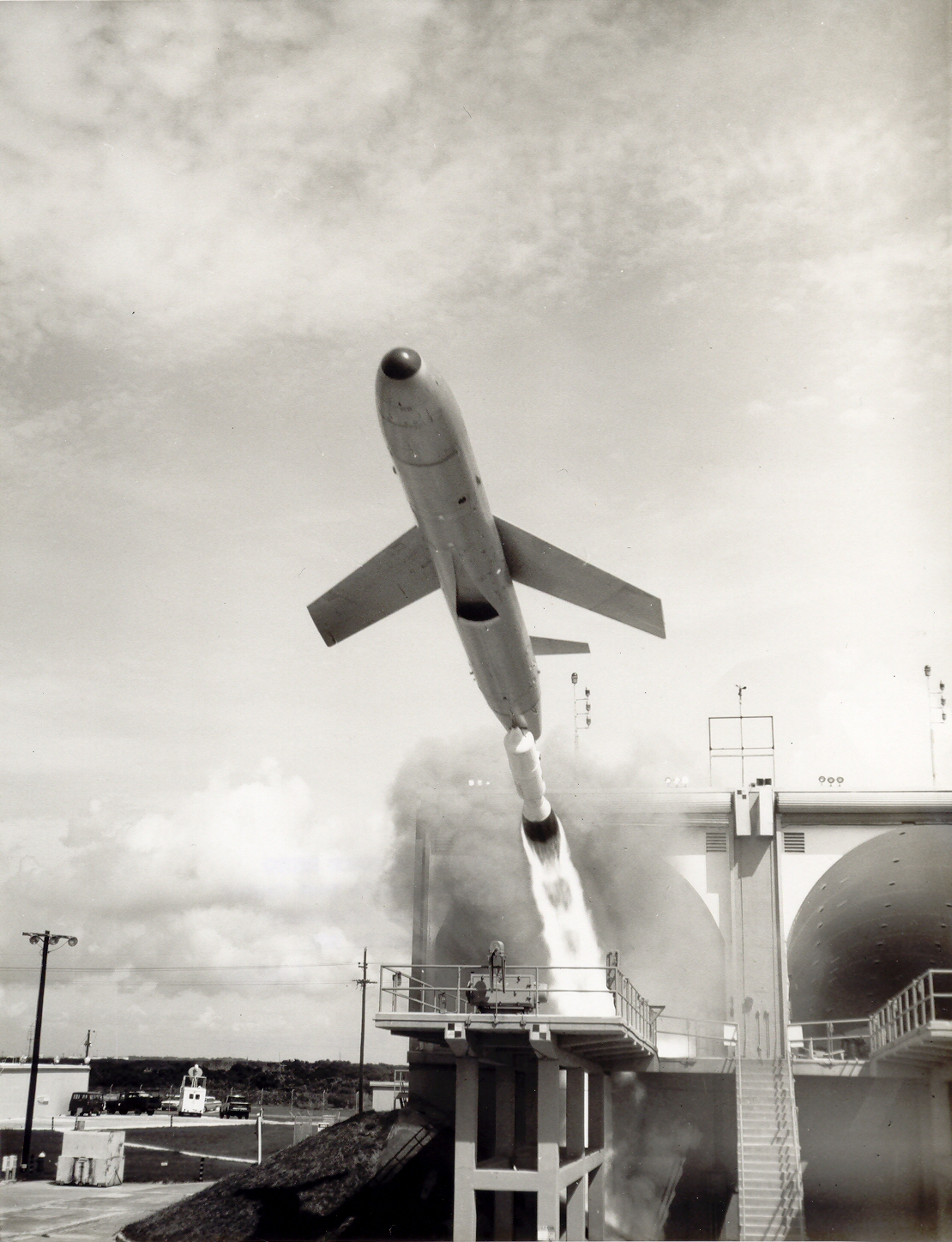
A MGM-13 MACE B missile test launch from Cape Canaveral, Florida. Controversy has emerged over whether, during the Cuban Missile Crisis, the Okinawa-based 873d Tactical Missile Squadron received orders to launch against Sino-Soviet targets.

32 Mace Missiles were kept on constant nuclear alert in hardened hangars at four of the island's launch sites. The 280mm M65 Atomic Cannon nicknamed "Atomic Annie" and the projectiles it fired were also based here. Okinawa at one point hosted as many as 1,200 nuclear warheads. At the time, nuclear storage locations existed at Kadena AFB in Chibana and the hardened MGM-13 MACE missile launch sites; Naha AFB, Henoko [Camp Henoko (Ordnance Ammunition Depot) at Camp Schwab], and the Nike Hercules units on Okinawa.

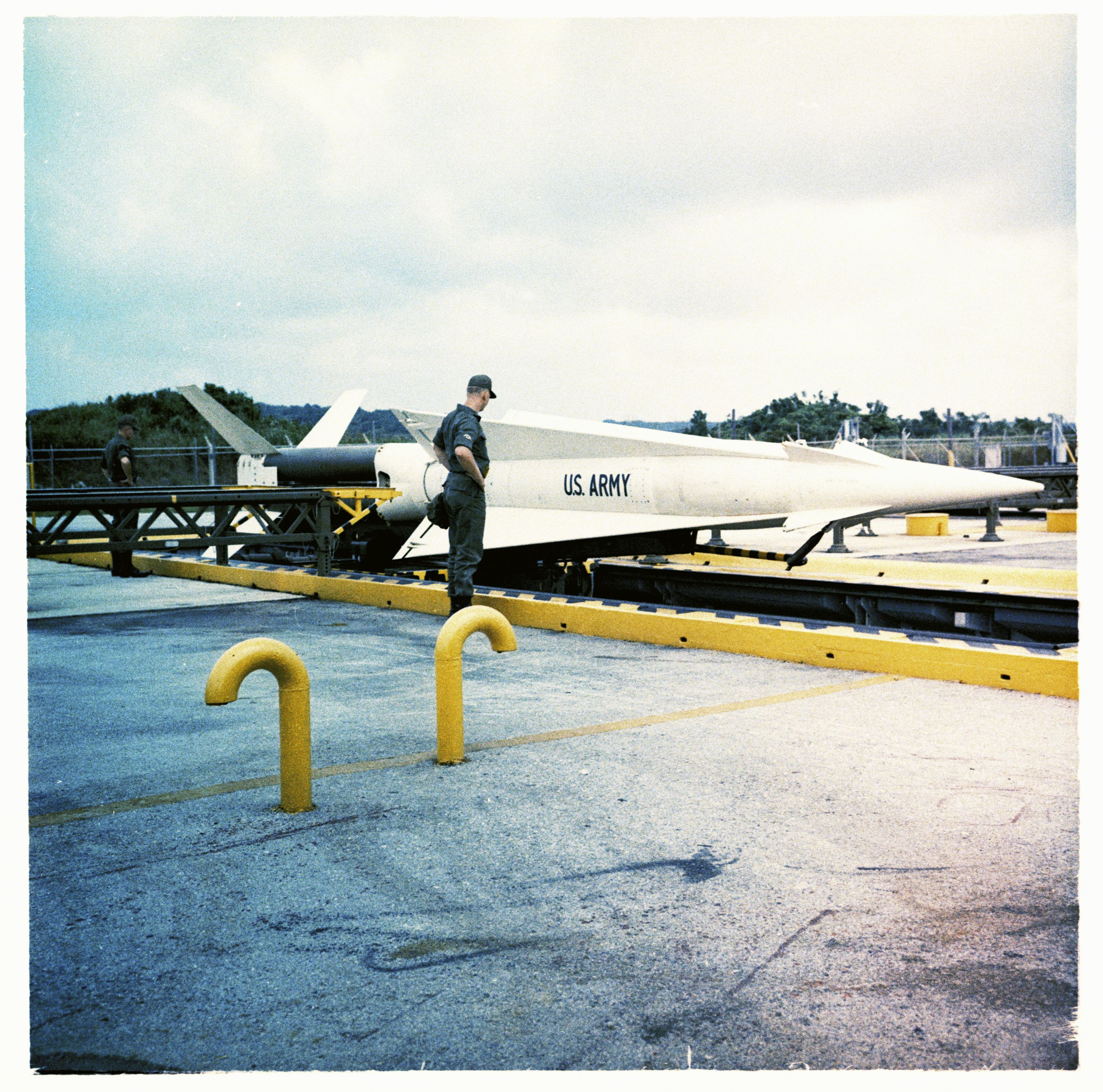
MIM-14 Nike-H missile at Okinawa, June 1967

In June or July 1959, a MIM-14 Nike-Hercules anti-aircraft missile was accidentally fired from the Nike site 8 battery at Naha Air Base on Okinawa which according to some witnesses, was complete with a nuclear warhead. While the missile was undergoing continuity testing of the firing circuit, known as a squib test, stray voltage caused a short circuit in a faulty cable that was lying in a puddle and allowed the missile's rocket engines to ignite with the launcher still in a horizontal position. The Nike missile left the launcher and smashed through a fence and down into a beach area skipping the warhead out across the water "like a stone." The rocket's exhaust blast killed two Army technicians and injured one. A similar accidental launch of a Nike-H missile had occurred on April 14, 1955, at the W-25 site in Davidsonville, Maryland, which is near the National Security Agency headquarters at Fort George G. Meade.

On October 28, 1962, during the peak of Cuban Missile Crisis U.S. Strategic Forces were at Defense Condition Two or DEFCON 2. According to missile technicians who witnessed events, the four MACE B missile sites on Okinawa erroneously received coded launch orders to fire all of their 32 nuclear cruise missiles at the Soviets and their allies. Quick thinking by Capt. William Bassett who questioned whether the order was "the real thing, or the biggest screw up we will ever experience in our lifetime” delayed the orders to launch until the error was realized by the missile operations center. According to witness John Bordne, Capt. Bassett was the senior field officer commanding the missiles and was nearly forced to have a subordinate lieutenant who was intent on following the orders to launch his missiles shot by armed security guards. No U.S. Government record of this incident has ever been officially released. Former missileers have refuted Bordne's account.

Next, on December 5, 1965, off of the coast of Okinawa, an A-4 Skyhawk attack aircraft rolled off of an elevator of the aircraft carrier USS Ticonderoga (CV-14) into 16,000 feet of water resulting in the loss of the pilot, the aircraft, and the B43 nuclear bomb it was carrying, all of which were too deep for recovery. Since the ship was traveling to Japan from duty in the Vietnam war zone, no public mention was made of the incident at the time and it would not come to light until 1981 when a Pentagon report revealed that a one-megaton bomb had been lost. Japan then formally asked for details of the incident.

Last, In September 1968, Japanese newspapers reported that radioactive Cobalt-60 had been detected contaminating portions of the Naha Port Facility, sickening three. The radioactive contamination was believed by scientists to have emanated from visiting U.S. nuclear submarines.

===== B-52 Crash at Kadena Air Base (1968) =====
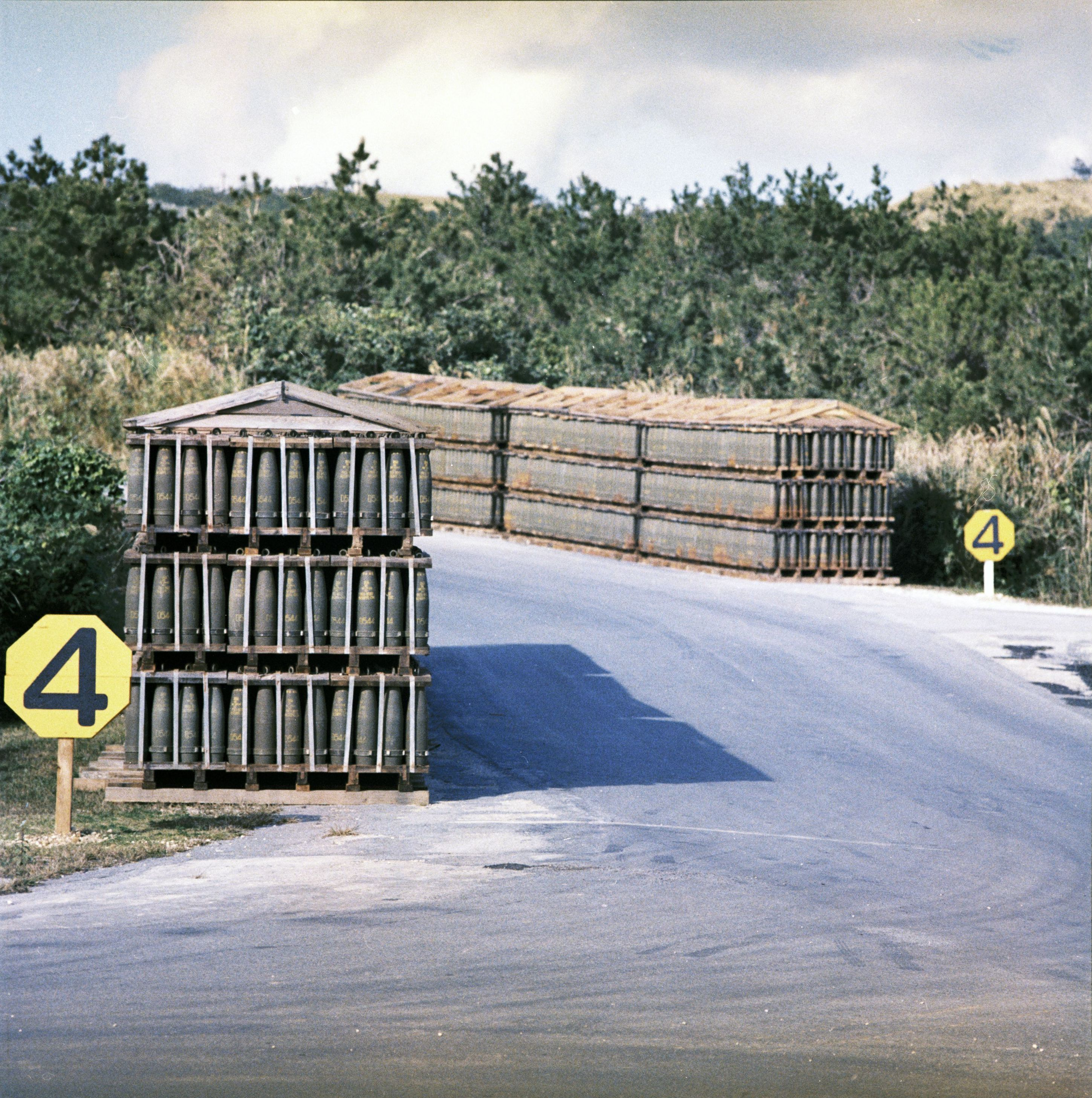
Thousands of artillery projectiles at Chibana Army Ammunition Depot, February 1969

Finally, on November 19, 1968, a U.S. Air Force Strategic Air Command (SAC) B-52 Stratofortress (registration number 55-01030) with a full bomb load, broke up and caught fire after the plane aborted takeoff at Kadena Air Base, Okinawa while it was conducting an Operation Arc Light bombing mission to the Socialist Republic of Vietnam during the Vietnam War. The plane's pilot was able to keep the plane on the ground and bring the aircraft to a stop while preventing a much larger catastrophe. The aircraft came to rest near the edge of the Kadena's perimeter, some 250 meters from the Chibana Ammunition Depot.

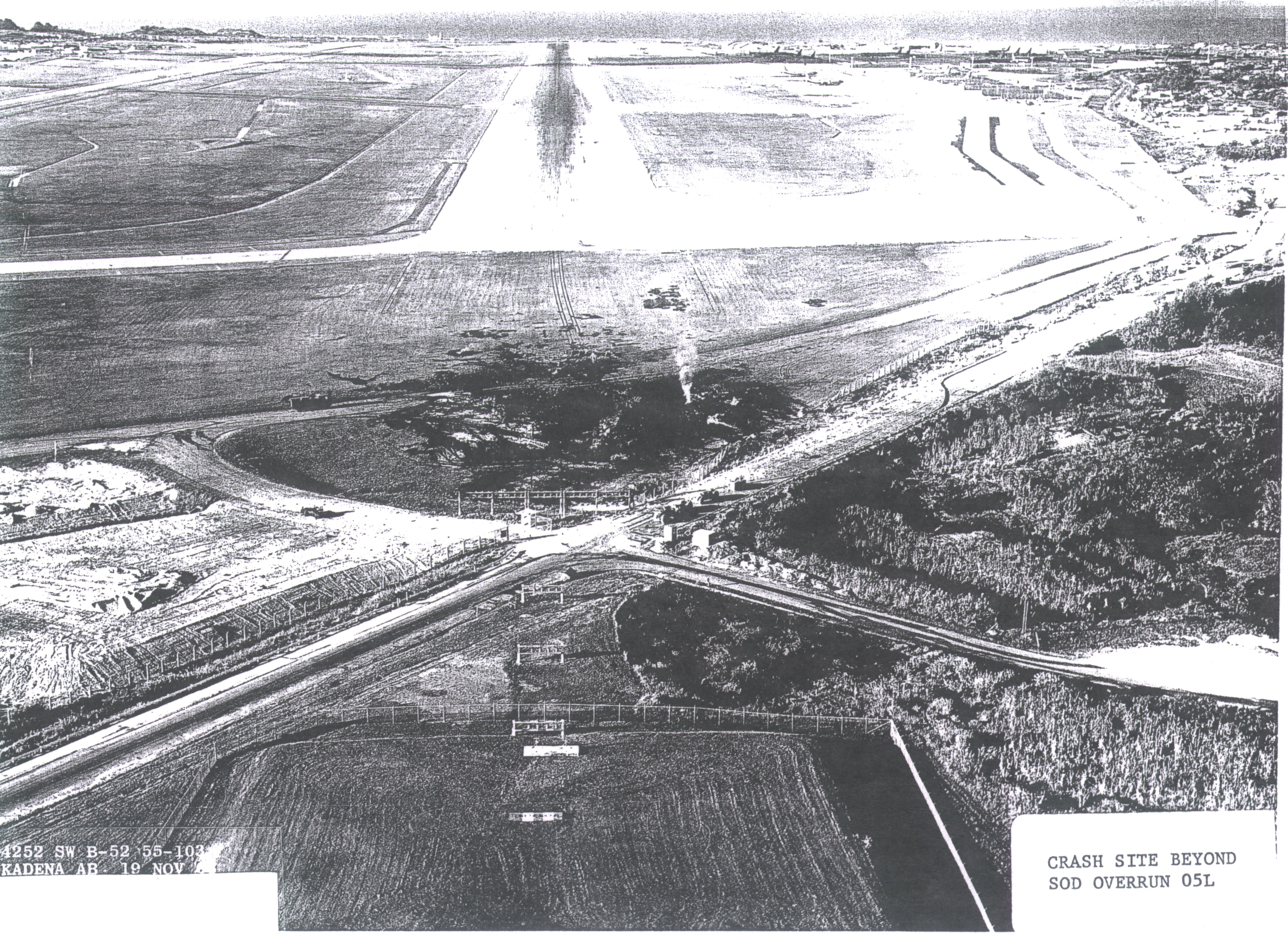
B-52 #55-103 Crash site, Kadena, AFB, Okinawa, November 19, 1968

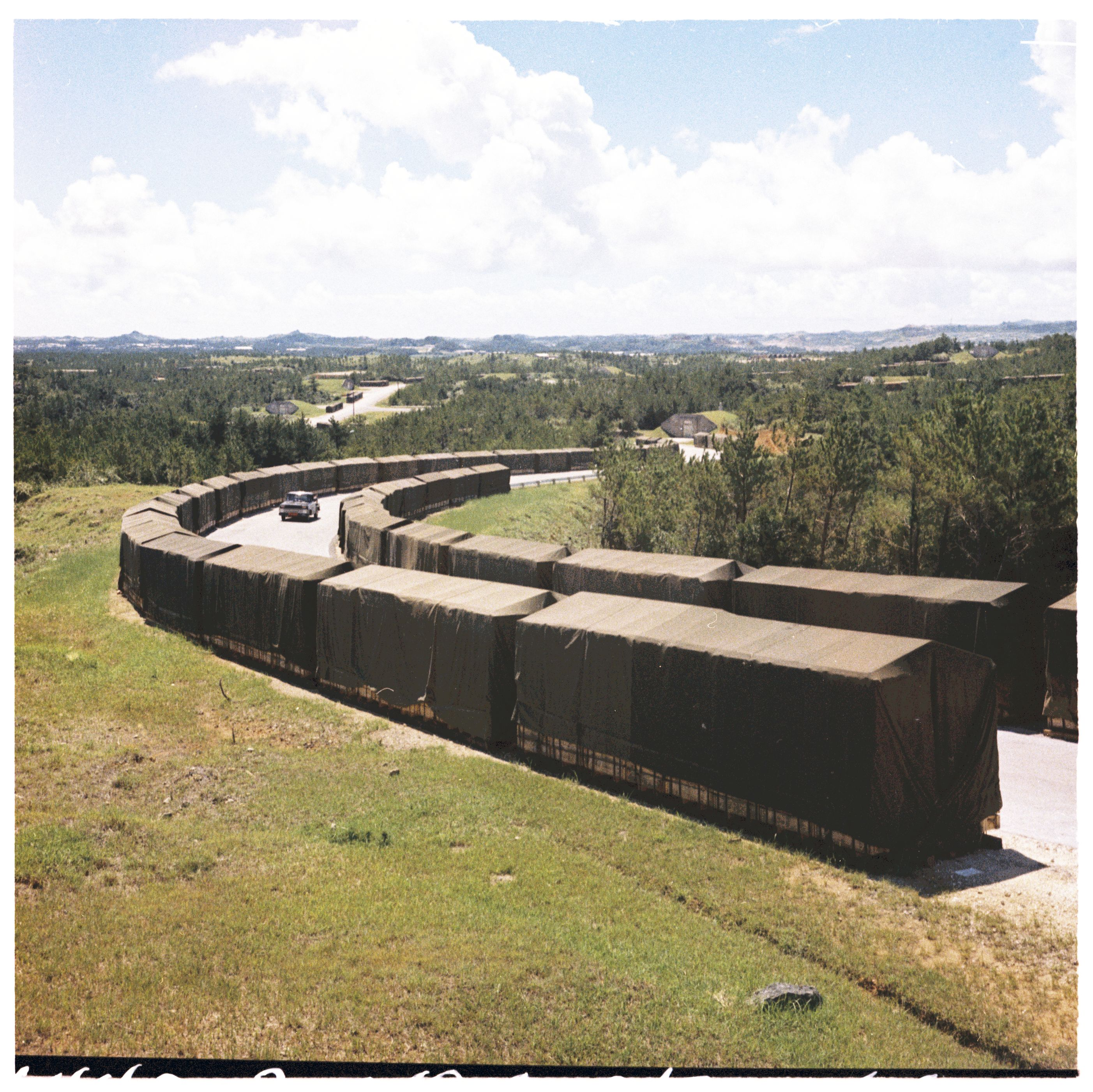
Tens of thousands of artillery projectiles at Chibana Army Ammunition Depot, September 1969

The fire resulting from the aborted takeoff ignited the plane's fuel and detonated the plane's 30,000-pound (13,600 kg) bomb load, causing a blast so powerful that it created a crater under the burning aircraft some thirty feet deep and sixty feet across. The blast blew out the windows in the dispensary at Naha Air Base (now Naha Airport), 23 miles (37 km) away and damaged 139 houses. The plane was reduced "to a black spot on the runway". The blast was so large that Air Force spokesman had to announce that there had only been conventional bombs on board the plane. Nothing remained of the aircraft except the landing gear and engine assemblies, a few bombs, and some loose explosive that had not detonated. Very small fragments of aircraft metal from the enormous blast were "spread like confetti," leaving the crew to use a double entendre to refer to the cleanup work, calling it, "'52 Pickup." The planes Electronic Warfare Officer and the Crew Chief later died from burn injuries after being evacuated from Okinawa. Two Okinawan workers were also injured in the blasts.

Had the plane become airborne, only seconds later it would have crashed farther north of the runway and directly into the Chibana Ammunition Depot, which stored ammunition, bombs, high explosives, tens of thousands of artillery shells, and warheads for 19 different atomic and thermonuclear weapons systems in the hardened weapon storage areas. The depot held the Mark 28 nuclear bomb warheads used in the MGM-13 Mace cruise missile as well as warheads for nuclear tipped MGR-1 Honest John and MIM-14 Nike-Hercules (Nike-H) missiles. The depot also included 52 igloos in the Red Hat Storage Area containing Project Red Hat's chemical weapons and presumably Project 112's biological agents.

The crash led to demands to remove the B-52s from Okinawa and strengthened a push for the reversion from U.S. rule in Okinawa. The crash sparked fears that another potential disaster on the island could put the chemical and nuclear stockpile and the surrounding population in jeopardy and increased the urgency of moving them to a less populated and less active storage location.

=== Nuclear debate ===
Former Mayor and Governor of Osaka Tōru Hashimoto in 2008 argued on several television programs that Japan should possess nuclear weapons, but has since said that this was his private opinion.

Former Governor of Tokyo 1999–2012, Shintaro Ishihara was an advocate of Japan having nuclear weapons.

On 29 March 2016, then-U.S. President candidate Donald Trump suggested that Japan should develop its own nuclear weapons, claiming that it was becoming too expensive for the US to continue to protect Japan from countries such as China, North Korea, and Russia that already have their own nuclear weapons.

On 27 February 2022, former prime minister Shinzo Abe proposed that Japan should consider a nuclear sharing arrangement with the US similar to NATO. This includes housing American nuclear weapons on Japanese soil for deterrence. This plan comes in the wake of the 2022 Russian invasion of Ukraine. Many Japanese politicians consider Vladimir Putin's threat to use nuclear weapons against a non-nuclear state to be a game changer. Abe wants to stimulate necessary debate:

"It is necessary to understand how the world’s security is maintained. We should not put a taboo on discussions about the reality we face."

== See also ==
- Japanese nuclear weapon program
- Japan's non-nuclear weapons policy
- Nuclear latency
