= Unit 516 =

Japanese chemical weapons facility

Unit 516 (第五一六部隊) was a top secret Japanese chemical weapons facility, operated by the Kempeitai, in Qiqihar, Japanese-occupied northeast China. The name Unit 516 was a code name (Tsūshōgō) of the Unit. It was officially called the Kwantung Army Chemical Weapons Section and operated underneath Unit 731.

An estimated 700,000 (Japanese estimation) to 2,000,000 (Chinese estimation) Japanese-produced chemical weapons were buried in China. Until 1995, Japan had refused to acknowledge that it dumped chemical weapons in the Nen River between Heilongjiang and Hulunbei'er, leaving huge amounts behind.

== Chemical weapons ==
- Phosgene
- Hydrogen cyanide
- Bromobenzyl cyanide and Chloroacetophenone
- Diphenylcyanoarsine and Diphenylchloroarsine
- Arsenic trichloride
- Sulfur Mustard
- Lewisite

At the end of World War II, the Imperial Japanese Army buried some of their chemical weapons in China, but most were confiscated by Soviet Red Army, the People's Liberation Army and the Kuomintang Army, along with other weapons. The Soviet Union later handed over these weapons to China (ROC), who then buried them. Japanese chemical weapons were later found mixed with Soviet and Chinese chemical weapons.

The Japanese National Institute for Defense Studies has a record of Japanese weapons confiscated by Kuomintang Army along with a list of the types of chemical weapons. No confiscation records about ROC / Russia have been found. However, no country has records about the locations of the buried chemical weapons. China has started gathering these abandoned weapons for destruction and burial, and they are currently buried in remote Dunhua County, in Haerbaling, Jilin (吉林) province.

== The Chemical Weapons Convention ==
One of the focuses of the Chemical Weapons Convention was to assign responsibility for the destruction of old chemical weapons in China. The convention was signed in 1993 and according to it, all chemical weapons created after 1925 must be destroyed by the originating-country. Under the convention, Japan is building a factory in China to destroy chemical weapons.

== See also ==
- Changde chemical weapon attack
- War crimes in Manchukuo
- Japan and weapons of mass destruction

=== Other cases of abandoned chemical weapons ===
- Air raid on Bari
- San Jose Project
