= 267th Chemical Company =

- Active: April 20, 1945 – November 1, 1945; December 1, 1962 – June 24, 2004
- Disbanded: July 2004
- Country: United States
- Allegiance: United States Army
- Branch: Chemical Corps
- Role: RED HAT chemical munitions surety
- Garrison/HQ: Waegwan, South Korea (2001–2004); Johnston Atoll, Pacific Ocean (1971–2001); Okinawa, Japan (1962–1971); Fort Richardson, Alaska (1945);
- Nicknames: "Red Hats," later: "Dragon Warriors"
- Mascot: Thumper (chemical sentry rabbit)
- Decorations: Meritorious Unit Commendation (1967), Meritorious Unit Commendation (1971), Superior Unit Award (1992)

The 267th Chemical Company was a military unit of the U.S. Army Chemical Corps responsible for the surety of chemical warfare agents dubbed "RED HAT" deployed to the Islands of Okinawa, Japan and subsequently Johnston Atoll in the Pacific Ocean. A recently discovered Army document reveals that the true mission of the 267th Chemical Company was the operation of the Okinawa deployment site as part Project 112. Project 112 was a 1960s biological warfare field test program that was conducted by the Deseret Test Center. Okinawa is not listed as a test site under Project 112 by the U.S. Department of Defense.

The 267th Chemical Platoon had the mission of operation of Site 2, Department of Defense Project 112 on Okinawa. Project 112 tests on Okinawa are not acknowledged by the United States Department of Defense.

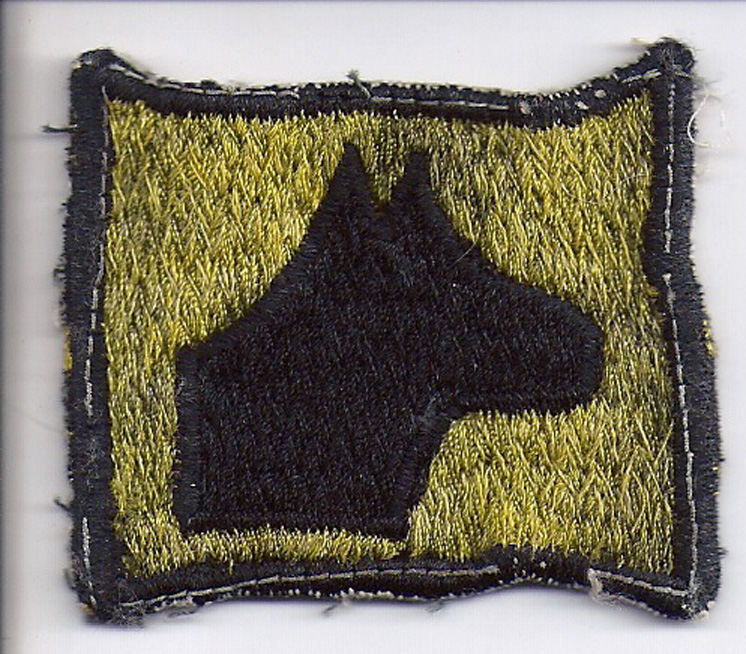
Sentry Dog Qualification Patch from 267th Chemical Company. This patch is mentioned in John Burnnam's book, A Soldier's Best friend.

== Unit history ==
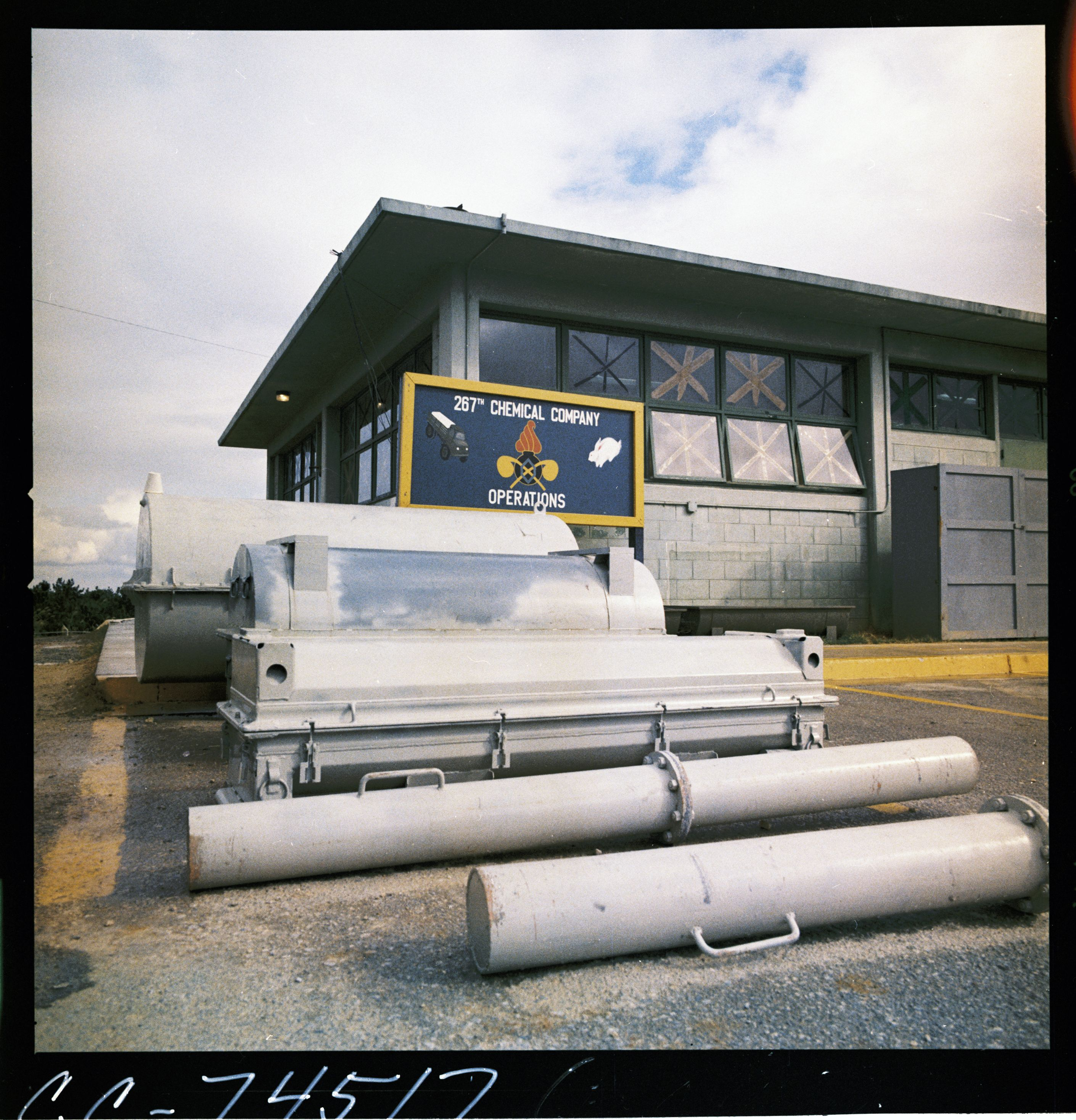
267th Chemical Company operations building on Okinawa. Mascot Thumper is depicted on the sign.

On April 20, 1945, the 267th Chemical Service Platoon (SVC) was activated at Fort Richardson, Alaska, but the platoon was inactivated on Nov. 1 of the same year, primarily because of the end of World War II. The platoon was re-designated on November 30, 1962, and activated on Okinawa on December 1, 1962, as 267th Chemical Platoon (SVC) with an authorized strength of 2 officers and 72 enlisted men. The unit was assigned to U.S. Army Depot, Okinawa at Chibana.

According to a document outlining the units history that was re-discovered in 2012, the 267th Chemical Platoon (SVC) had the mission of operation of Site 2, U.S. Department of Defense Project 112 a top secret Cold War testing program which was aimed at both human, animal, and plant reaction to Biological Warfare.
In a letter, sent March 26, 1966, by Capt. Charles H. Vogeler, Commander of the Army Chemical Corps, responding to the commanding officer of the 196th Ordnance Battalion, the history of the 267th Chemical Platoon was outlined as follows:

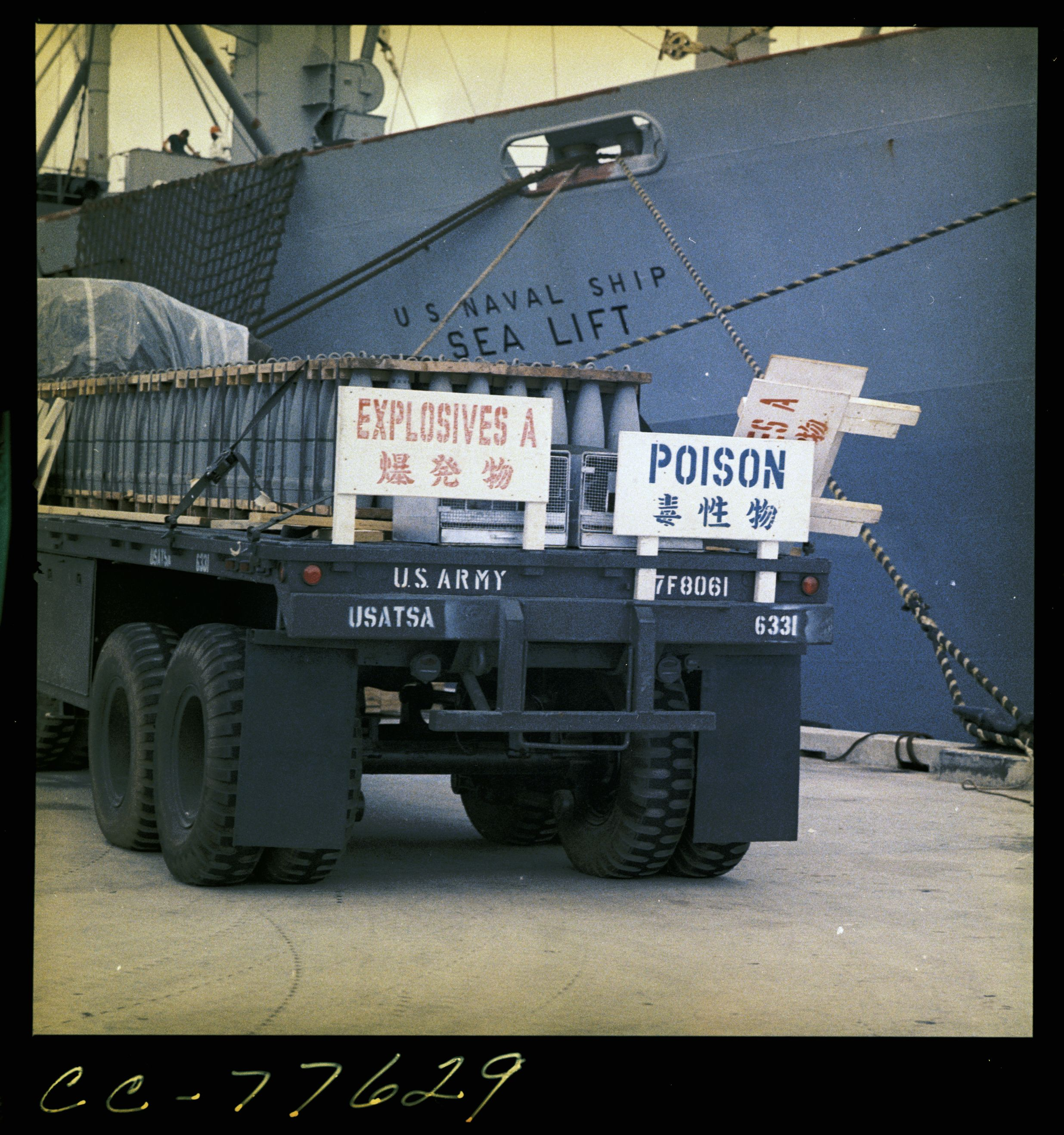
USNS Sealift with nerve agent at Tengan Pier during operation Red Hat, Okinawa, July 1971

In compliance with para 6, 2nd [Logistical Command] Log Comd Bulletin, dated 11 March 1966, the following data is submitted.

ORGANIZATIONAL HISTORY - 267th Chemical Company:

The 267th Chemical Company was activated on Okinawa on 1 December 1962 as 267th Chemical Platoon (SVC). Prior to assignment to Okinawa, key personnel attended an [on the job training] (OJT) depot operations course at Rocky Mountain Arsenal, Colorado. The platoon leader; 1/Lt James D. Saunders, CmlC, along with thirty-five NCOs and EM [enlisted men] began establishing operating procedures for the newly activated unit.

The 267th Chemical Platoon (SVC) had the mission of operation of Site 2, DOD Project 112. The Unit was assigned to the U.S. Army Ordnance Group, USARYIS [United States Army, Ryukyu Islands] and Unit personnel attached to Chibana Troop Headquarters for rations and billeting. All Unit personnel were actively engaged in preparing RED HAT area, Site 2, for the receipt and storage of first increment items, YBA DOD Project 112. A security officer, 1/Lt Samuel Negra, Inf, was assigned to the platoon.

First increment items, designated Code YBA arrived on Okinawa in May 1963. Due to limited assigned personnel, the Platoon was augmented with Army and other Armed Forces personnel to assist in storage of these items. Marine Corps personnel were utilized as security guards for the RED HAT Area. Upon completion of storage of YBA items, normal duties were exercised in the Unit, pending arrival of second increment, YBB, items.

During the interim period between completion of YBA and arrival of YBB in May 1964, Unit Security Section was augmented with temporary duty personnel to function as security guards and sentry dog handlers. Such personnel were usually assigned to the Unit for a ninety-day (90-day) day period.

Second increment items arrived on Okinawa in May 1964. The platoon was again augmented with Army and other Armed Forces personnel to accomplish storage of these items. Upon completion of storage of YBB items, the Platoon Leader was reassigned and replaced by 1/Lt Samuel Negra, Inf. An additional officer 2/Lt Ronald Minkow, CmlC, was assigned as Storage Officer. The platoon was reassigned to the U. S. Army Supply Services Command.

1/Lt Charles H. Vogeler, CmlC, was assigned to the platoon in February 1965 and assumed command shortly thereafter. 1st Lt. Willie D. Greene, CmlC, was assigned in April 1965. Preparation was being made for the receipt of 3rd Increment, items, designated Code YBF, in May 1965. Storage of YBF items was completed in August 1965.

The unit was reassigned to the U.S. Army Supply Maintenance Command in September 1965. This command was redesignated U. S. Army Depot, Okinawa shortly thereafter with assignment, to the 2nd Logistical Command.

The 267th Chemical Platoon (SVC) was redesignated 267th Chemical Company, 16 November 1965, pursuant to U.S. Army Pacific General Order 323 (USARPAC GO #323). Authorized strength was increased from two (2) officers and seventy-two (72) EM to four (4) officers and one hundred fifty-five (155) EM. In January 1966, the Unit was assigned to the 196th Ord. Bn. (Ammo) (DS), which arrived on Okinawa in December, 1965.

[signed]

Charles H. Vogeler Capt, CmlC, Commanding

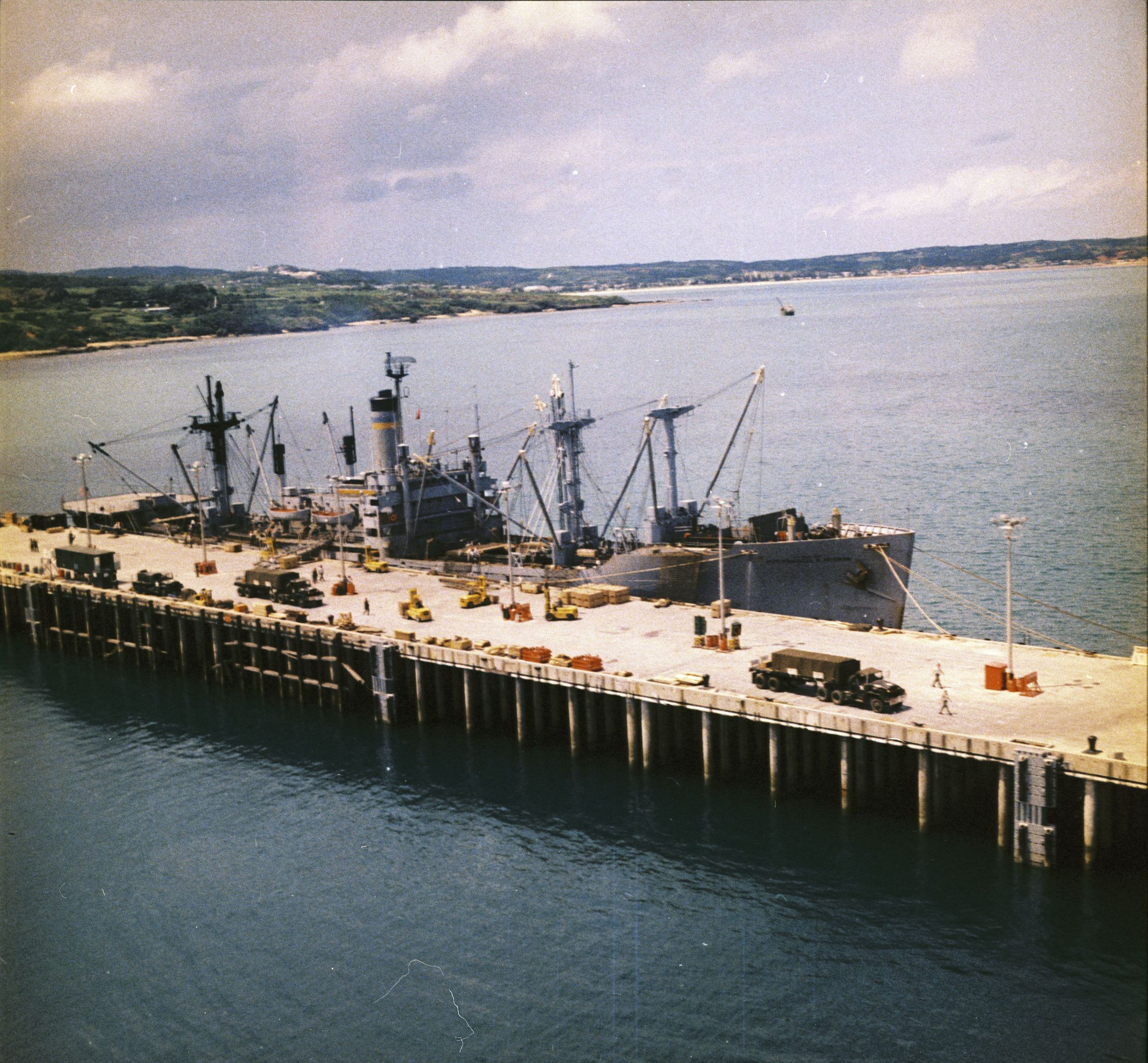
USNS Private Francis X. McGraw is loaded with chemical weapons at Tengan Pier, Okinawa during Operation Red Hat in September 1971

For its outstanding contributions to fulfillment of the 2d Logistics mission, the 267th Chemical Company was awarded the Meritorious Unit Citation for 18 military operations in Southeast Asia during the period of October 1965 to December 1966. According to unit records obtained from the Chemical Corps museum, the 267th Chemical Company either deployed to Vietnam or supported operations there from February 1966 to August 1967 and from July 1, 1970, to December 31, 1971.

After a nerve gas leak in 1969 injured 23 members of the 267th and one civilian, the United States Government had directed the removal of all toxic gases from Okinawa, Japan. The relocation mission brought about Operation Red Hat which was internationally publicized. The removal operation of all chemical munitions from Okinawa resulted in the 1971 relocation of the chemical weapons and the redeployment of the 267th Chemical Company to Johnston Atoll in the Central Pacific during Operation Red Hat.

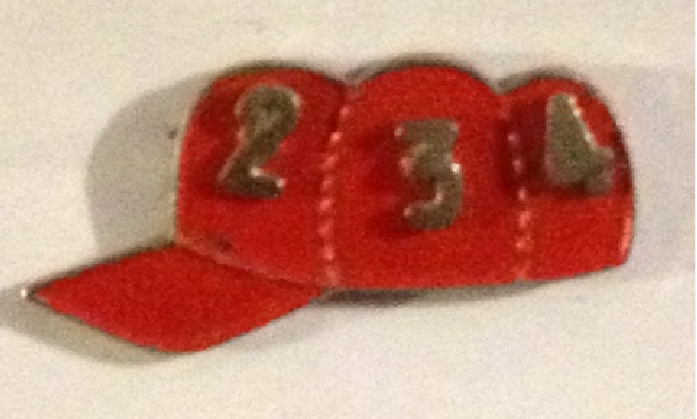
Morale pin issued to Operation Red Hat participants in 1971

The cargo discharge from the USNS Private Francis X. McGraw (T-AK-241) at Johnston Island on September 21, 1971, completed the movement phase of Operation Red Hat, and the 276th Chemical Company commanded by Cpt. Goforth, Cml Corps., completed its redeployment to Johnston Atoll on Sept. 27, 1971. The unit replaced the USARHAW Provisional Detachment assigned to Johnston Atoll in Jun 1971 and commanded by 1Lt Darwyn Walker, Cml Corps, and two enlisted personnel who were assigned to prepare for the arrival of the company and munitions. The Provisional Detachment had reported to Col. Gill, Commander, USARHAW Munitions Division. 1Lt Walker joined the 267th Chemical Company upon its arrival as the Executive Officer and became the Operations Officer for the Red Hat Munition Depot. For receiving and storing the munitions, the 267th Chemical Company was augmented with two Terminal Service Companies from Fort Eustis, a Technical Escort Detachment from Edgewood Arsenal and a hard hat Navy salvage vessel which included Navy EOD personnel. Receiving, inventorying, and storage operations were conducted daily for 90 consecutive days.

For outstanding execution of Operation Red Hat, members of the 267th Chemical Company were commended by General Westmoreland, General Rossen, Lieutenant General Lambert, Major General Hayes, and Major General Pennington when the unit was awarded its second Meritorious Unit Commendation. Numerous reorganizations and authorized strength changes took place between September 27, 1971, when the unit arrived at Johnston Island and late 1979 during a time when the unit was assigned between the U.S. Army, Pacific, Forces Command, and Western Command.

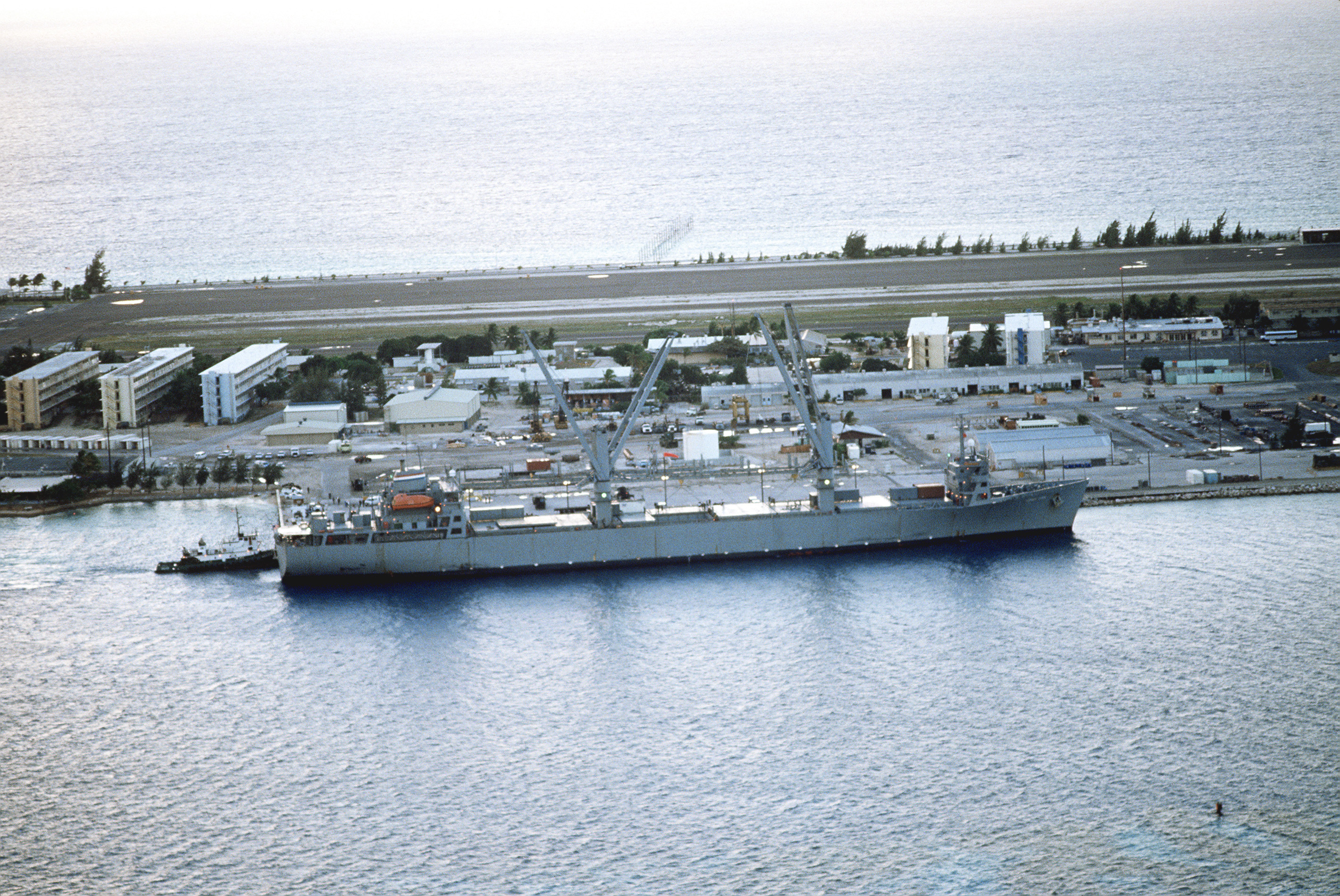
The U.S. Military Sealift Command auxiliary crane ship SS Gopher State (T-ACS-4) arrives at Johnston Atoll during "Operation Steel Box" also known as "Operation Golden Python", a 1990 joint U.S.-West German operation which moved U.S. chemical weapons from Germany to Johnston Atoll for storage and disposal.

A May 1975 letter to a member of the 267th Chemical Company from his Commander notes that the primary mission on Johnston Island consisted of maintaining a forty-one acre chemical munitions storage area, called Red Hat, having forty-three storage structures containing about 13,000 tons of munitions. A Johnston Atoll orientation packet from the same time period explains that the mission of the 267th Chemical Company, noted to also be known as "Red Hat," was to provide for the storage, maintenance, security, issuance, and surveillance of chemical munitions. In 1976 the company came under the 45th General Support Group.

In October 1983, the 267th Chemical Company was re-designated under the Johnston Island Chemical Activity. This re-designation included the assignment of a platoon of Military Police for security. On November 9, 1984, the Vice Chief of Staff of the Army, General Maxwell Thurman, visited Johnston Atoll and initiated significant changes to the structure of the organization. On July 8, 1985, Johnston Island Chemical Activity became the United States Army Chemical Activity, Western Command, a major subordinate command of Western Command. The change included the reorganization of the chemical activity at Johnston island into three components called the Military Police Company (MPC) to provide physical security for toxic chemical munitions and facilities located on Johnston Island Atoll, and on order, conduct island defense; the Headquarters / Headquarters Detachment (HHD) to provide administrative support including personnel and budget management, logistical support, chemical surety matters, personnel security, training management, treaty compliance and on order, support the deployment of a response force for personnel decontamination operations in the Pacific area of response; and the Chemical Ammunition Support Division (CASD) to handle the poison munitions.

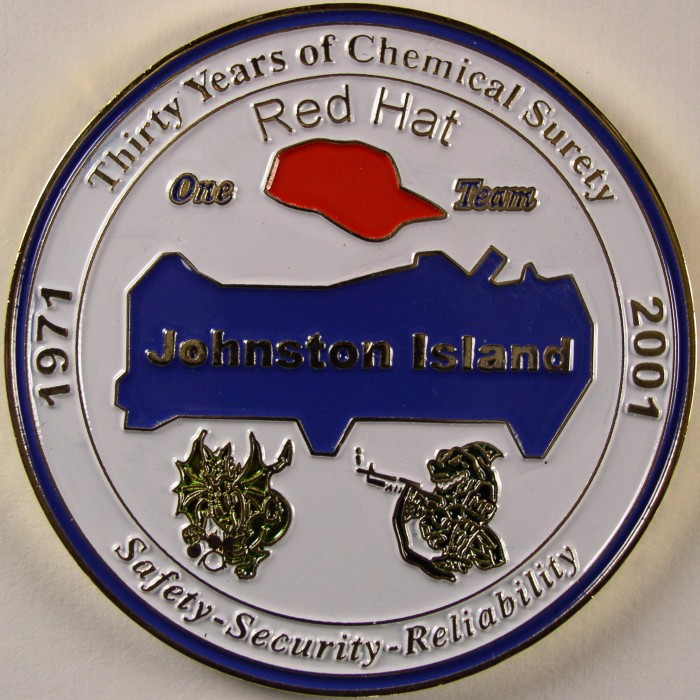
Operation Red Hat challenge coin commemorating 30th year of mission at Johnston Atoll

Subsequently, on August 30, 1990, the activity was renamed the U.S. Army Chemical Activity, Pacific (USACAP) to coincide with the re-designation of U.S. Army, Pacific Command. Worldwide attention was focused on Johnston Atoll that same year, when chemical munitions were moved from West Germany, under the code name Operation Steel Box."

During the period of June 1990 to June 1991, USACAP had assisted in the start-up of the Johnston Atoll Chemical Agent Disposal System (JACADS), the transfer of retrograde of chemical munitions from Germany during Operation Steel Box, and the recovery of chemical munitions from the Solomon Islands in Operation Kalama Express. These events resulted in the unit receiving the U.S. Army Superior Unit Award on July 20, 1992, from the Secretary of the Army.

In October 1993 the Department of the Army’s Environmental Support Group noted that the mission of the 267th Chemical Company on Johnston Atoll was overseeing the "storage, safeguard, maintenance, and security for ready to issue chemical agents;" rabbits were used as "live monitors" and "VX" rockets were assigned to the island. On November 1, 1994, USACAP reorganized by combining the HHC and CASD into one unit called the Chemical Ammunition Company (CAC).

On November 29, 2000, the last of the chemical weapons at JACADS was disposed of. The last disposal operation destroyed more than 13,000 VX filled land mines. The island had held over 400,000 rockets, projectiles, bombs, mortars, containers and mines. The U.S. Army Chemical Activity Pacific (USACAP) was deactivated during a Chemical Surety Decertification ceremony on Johnston Island held on April 11, 2001. The ceremony signaled the completion of 30 years of guarding America's cache of chemical weapons in the Pacific. The chemical unit and its predecessor's sole mission had been to guard chemical weapons shipped from Okinawa beginning in 1971.

Two years after the last chemical weapons on Johnston Atoll at were destroyed, the Army submitted the plan to dismantle the JACADS facility which the United States Environmental Protection Agency approved in September 2002. Demolition on the 80,000-square-foot (7,400 m^{2}) facility, home to the incinerators, laboratories and control rooms, took place from August–October 2003, and by November 2003, all infrastructure had been removed from the Atoll. A plaque dedicated to JACADS personnel was placed on Johnston Island at that time.

By 2001 the 267th Chemical Company was stationed at Camp Carroll in Waegwan, South Korea and assigned to the 23rd Chemical Battalion as part of 19th Theater Support Command (Provisional). The unit was charged with decontaminating personnel and equipment in the aftermath of a potential North Korean chemical attack. On June 24, 2004, the 23d Chemical Battalion was ordered to inactivate the 267th Chemical Company. The 23rd Chemical Battalion was then reassigned to Fort Lewis, Washington in late 2004.
