= Operation Steel Box =

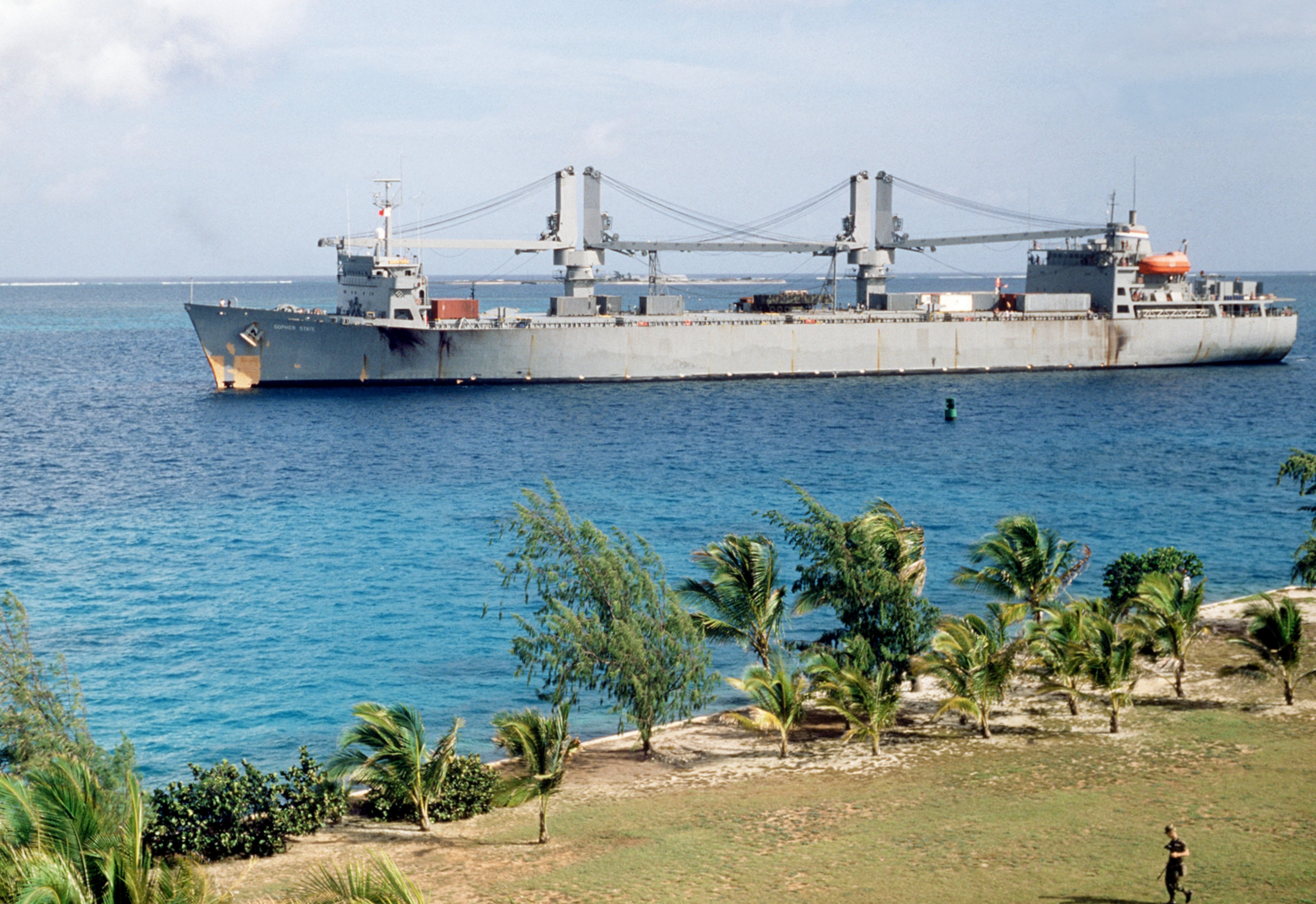
The U.S. Military Sealift Command auxiliary crane ship SS Gopher State (T-ACS-4) as the ship arrives at Johnston Atoll during Operation Steel Box

Operation Steel Box, also known as Operation Golden Python (German name for the transport in Germany: Aktion Lindwurm), was a 1990 joint U.S.–West German operation which moved over 100,000 U.S. chemical weapons from Germany to Johnston Atoll.

== Background ==
At a United States Army Site near Clausen, West Germany, 100,000 GB and VX filled American chemical munitions were stored in 15 concrete bunkers. These munitions were managed by the 330th Ordnance Company (EOD) and guarded by the 110th Military Police Company both headquartered in nearby Münchweiler an der Rodalb. The propellants for these munitions were stored in Leimen Site 67. The GB and VX munitions had undergone a refurbishment from 1980 to 1982. The weapons in this depot were scheduled to be moved due to an agreement between the United States and West Germany. The 1986 agreement, between Ronald Reagan and Helmut Kohl, provided for the removal of 155 mm and 8 inch unitary chemical projectiles.

== Conversion ==
The program sponsor, the Military Sealift Command, brought in the prestigious naval architecture firm, George G. Sharp, Inc. of New York City, as project manager to oversee the design-development efforts to modify and outfit the two crane ships for the mission and assigned former Electric Boat submarine engineer Jim Ruggieri, P.E., as project engineer. The vessels were outfitted with a collective protection system – or a positive pressure system used to pressurize the house relative to the cargo hold as a means of preventing inadvertent weapon gas migration in the event of a containment failure; staffed laboratories to provide a safe and comfortable environment for scientists to perform analyses of the products; automated “sniffer” and alarming modules to sample cargo hold air to detect containment failures, as well as detect and alarm positive pressure system failure; power generation modules to supplement ship power and emergency power provisions, and specialized communications modules to permit coordination with security forces.

== Operation ==
Operation Steel Box began on July 26, 1990, and ended on September 22, 1990, but the weapons did not reach their final destination until November. The move from the storage facility to an intermediate facility at Miesau utilized trucks and trains, civilian contractors, and U.S. and West German military personnel. The weapons were repacked and shipped by truck from their storage facility until they reached the railway in Miesau. The truck transport portion of the mission involved 28 road convoys which delivered the munitions the 30 miles from Clausen to Miesau.

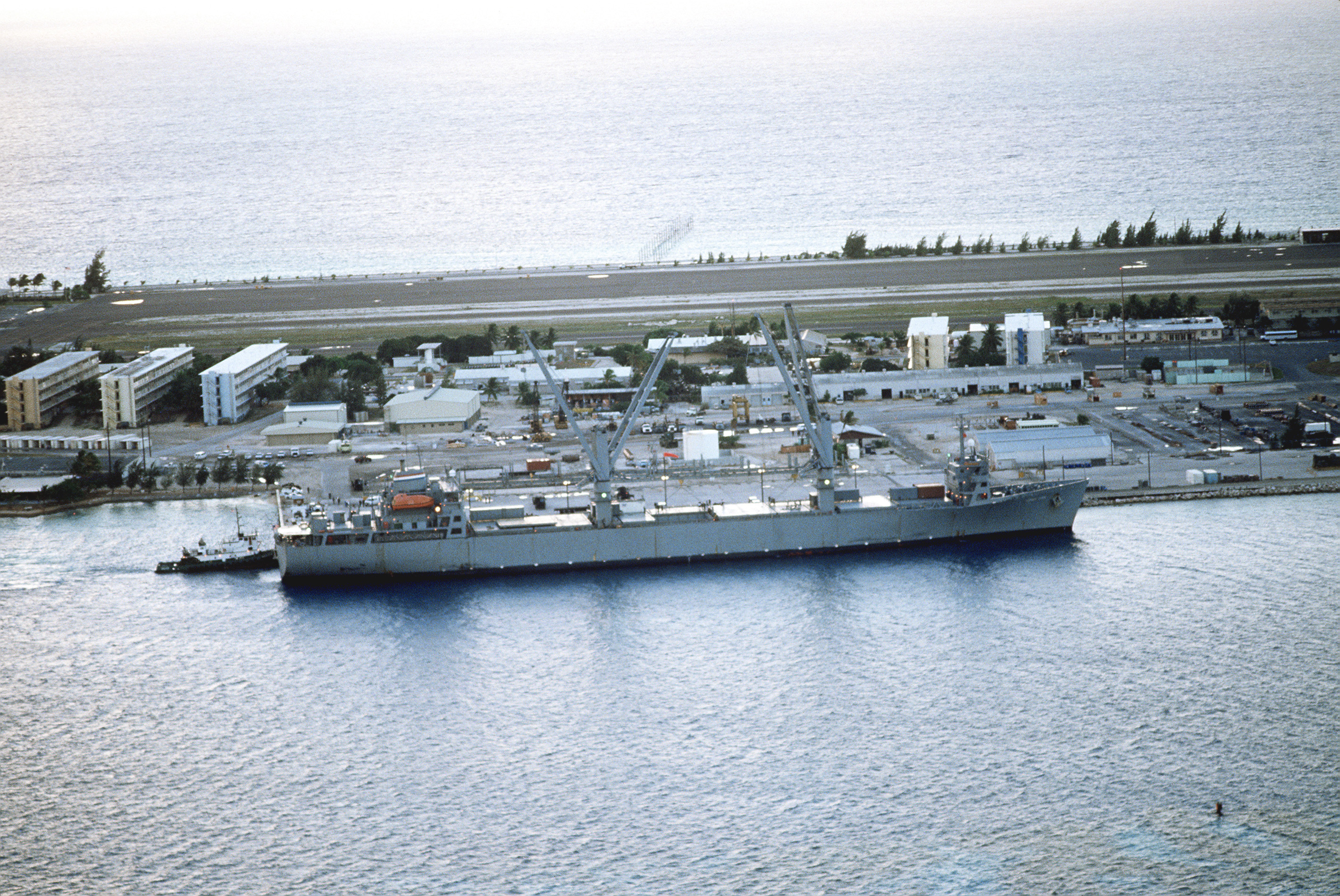
SS Gopher State, one of two ships that carried chemical weapons to Johnston Atoll, pictured here upon arrival at the atoll during Steel Box

The munitions were carried by special ammunition train from Miesau to the port of Nordenham. The train transport was well publicized and escorted by 80 U.S. and West German military and police vehicles. At the port the munitions were loaded onto two modified ships, the SS Gopher State and the SS Flickertail State, by the Army's Technical Escort Unit. The ships were operated by the U.S. Military Sealift Command, and upon leaving Nordenham they sailed for 46 straight days. The ships arrived at Johnston Atoll and on November 18 unloaded the last of their cargo containers.

== Reaction and issues ==
=== Security and emergency response ===
Security and emergency response were both concerns during Steel Box. Besides the police and military escort for the trains, the road convoys had restricted airspace overhead. Along the route, emergency response teams were on stand-by. While the ships were in port U.S. Navy EOD Detachments provided underwater hull sweeps to ensure limpet mines were not attached to the ships. The 46-day trip at sea was non-stop, with refueling taking place along the route. The ships were also escorted by the U.S. Navy guided missile cruiser USS Bainbridge and USS Truxtun. The transport ships avoided the Panama Canal, for security reasons, and took the route around Cape Horn, the tip of South America. There were no reported chemical agent leaks or security breaches during the transport phase of Steel Box.

=== International reaction ===
The 1990 shipments of nerve agents from Germany to the Johnston Atoll Chemical Agent Disposal System facility caused several South Pacific nations to express unease. At the 1990 South Pacific Forum in Vanuatu, the island nations of the South Pacific indicated that their concern was that the South Pacific would become a toxic waste dumping ground. Other concerns raised included the security of the shipments, which were refueled at sea and escorted by U.S. guided missile destroyers, while they were en route to Johnston Atoll. In Australia, Prime Minister Bob Hawke drew criticism from some of these island nations for his support of the chemical weapons destruction at Johnston Atoll.

== See also ==
- 267th Chemical Company
- Operation Red Hat
