= Operation Red Hat =

1971 transfer of chemical warfare munitions

Operation Red Hat was a United States Department of Defense movement of chemical warfare munitions from Okinawa, Japan to Johnston Atoll in the North Pacific Ocean, which occurred in 1971.

== Background ==
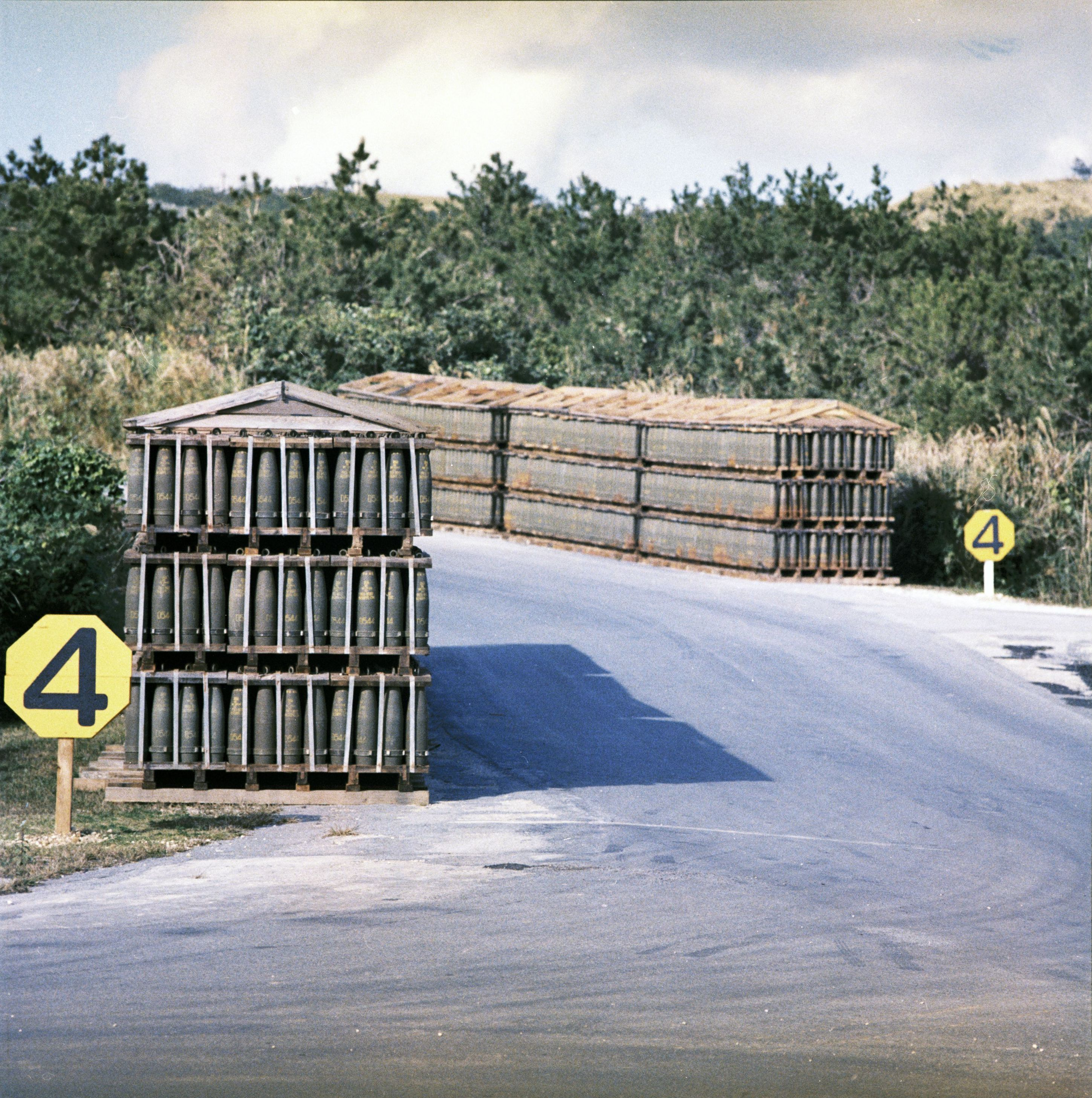
Ammunition at the Chibana Ammunition Depot, February 1969

U.S. chemical weapons were brought into Okinawa in 1962 based on the recommendation of Secretary of Defense Robert McNamara, according to declassified documents. In 1970, U.S. Defense Secretary Melvin Laird met Japan Defense Agency chief Yasuhiro Nakasone, and said that the United States had received information that North Korea had a supply of chemical weapons. The move of U.S. chemical weapons to Okinawa in 1962 was meant to serve as a deterrent.

The Red Hat code name was assigned by the Assistant Chief of Staff for Intelligence, Department of the Army, on November 12, 1962, during the planning to deploy chemical agents to the 267th Chemical Platoon on Okinawa. The 267th Chemical Platoon (Service) was activated on Okinawa on December 1, 1962 at Chibana Ammunition Depot. The depot was a hill-top installation next to Kadena Air Base. During this deployment, "Unit personnel were actively engaged in preparing RED HAT area, site 2 for the receipt and storage of first increment items, [shipment] "YBA", DOD Project 112." The company received further shipments, code named YBB and YBF, which according to declassified documents also included sarin, VX, and mustard gas. By 1969, according to later newspaper reports, there was an estimated 1.9 million kg (1,900 metric tons) of VX stored on Okinawa.

In 1969, over 20 personnel (23 U.S. soldiers and one U.S. civilian, according to other reports) were exposed to low levels of the nerve agent sarin while sandblasting and repainting storage containers. The resultant publicity appears to have contributed to the decision to move the weapons off Okinawa.

Chemical agents were stored in the high security Red Hat Storage Area (RHSA) which included hardened igloos in the weapon storage area, the Red Hat building (#850), two Red Hat hazardous waste warehouses (#851 and #852), an open storage area, and security entrances and guard towers.

== Transfer in 1971 ==
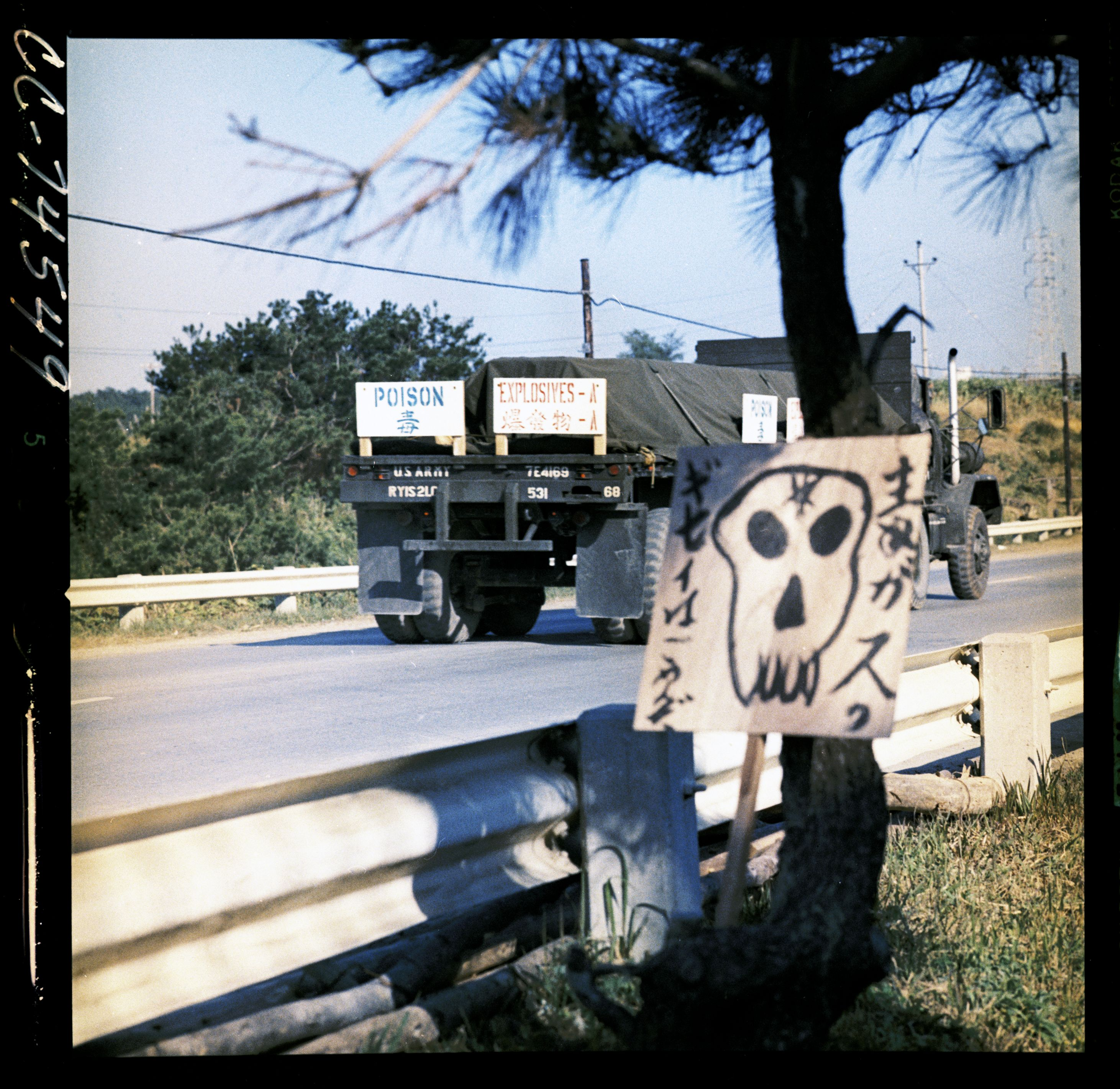
Noborikawa Village, Okinawa

The US government directed relocation of chemical munitions from Okinawa to Johnston Atoll in 1971. An official U.S. film on the mission says that "safety was the primary concern during the operation", though Japanese resentment of U.S. military activities on Okinawa also complicated the situation. At the technical level, time pressures imposed to complete the mission, the heat, and water rationing problems also complicated the planning.

The initial phase of Operation Red Hat involved the movement of chemical munitions from a depot storage site to Tengan Pier, eight miles away, and required 1,332 trailers in 148 convoys. The second phase of the operation moved the munitions to Johnston Atoll. The Army leased 41 acres (170,000 m^{2}) on Johnston Atoll. Phase I of the operation took place in January and moved 150 tons of distilled mustard (HD), a blister agent chemically identical to mustard agent (H), manufactured by either the Levinstein or Thiodiglycol processes, but purified further so that it can be stored longer before polymerizing. The USNS Lt. James E. Robinson (T-AK-274) arrived at Johnston Atoll with a load of HD projectiles on January 13, 1971.

Phase II completed cargo discharge to Johnston Atoll with five moves of the remaining 12,500 tons of munitions, in August and September 1971. They arrived in the following order: USNS Sea Lift (T-LSV-9), USNS Private Francis X. McGraw (T-AK-241), USNS Miller, USNS Sealift, USNS Pvt McGraw. The USS Grapple (ARS-7), under the command of a Captain Pilcher, was part of Operation Red Hat.

Units operating under United States Army Ryukyu Islands (USARYIS) were 2nd Logistical Command and the 267th Chemical Company, the 5th and 196th Ordnance Detachments (EOD), and the 175th Ordnance Detachment. Originally, it was planned that the munitions be moved to Umatilla Chemical Depot but this never happened due to public opposition and political pressure. The United States Congress passed legislation on January 12, 1971 (PL 91-672) that prohibited the transfer of nerve agent, mustard agent, Agent Orange and other chemical munitions to all 50 U.S. states.

== Storage and destruction ==
The 1971 weapons transfer voyages transported the chemical agents that became the first stockpile at Johnston Atoll. The chemical weapons brought from Okinawa included nerve and blister agents contained in rockets, artillery shells, bombs, mines, and one-ton (900 kg) containers. In 1985 the U.S. Congress mandated that all chemical weapons stockpiled at Johnston Atoll, mostly mustard gas, Sarin, and VX gas, be destroyed. Prior to the beginning of destruction operations, Johnston Atoll held about 6.6 percent of the entire U.S. stockpile of chemical weapons.

The Johnston Atoll Chemical Agent Disposal System (JACADS) was built to destroy all the chemical munitions on the island. The first weapon disposal incineration operation took place on June 30, 1990. Transition from the testing phase to full-scale operations began in May 1993, and in August full-scale operations began. Twice, in 1993 and 1994, the facility had to be evacuated because of hurricanes; operations were delayed for as long as 70 days during these periods. On December 9, 1993, a spill of about 500 pounds (226 kg) of Sarin (Agent GB) occurred inside the Munitions Demilitarization Building. No sarin leaked beyond the building and the contingency plan was not activated. JACADS suspended incineration of munitions until investigation of the incident was satisfactorily completed. The last munitions were destroyed in 2000.

== See also ==
- Operation Steel Box
