= Johnston Atoll Chemical Agent Disposal System =

Chemical munitions disposal facility

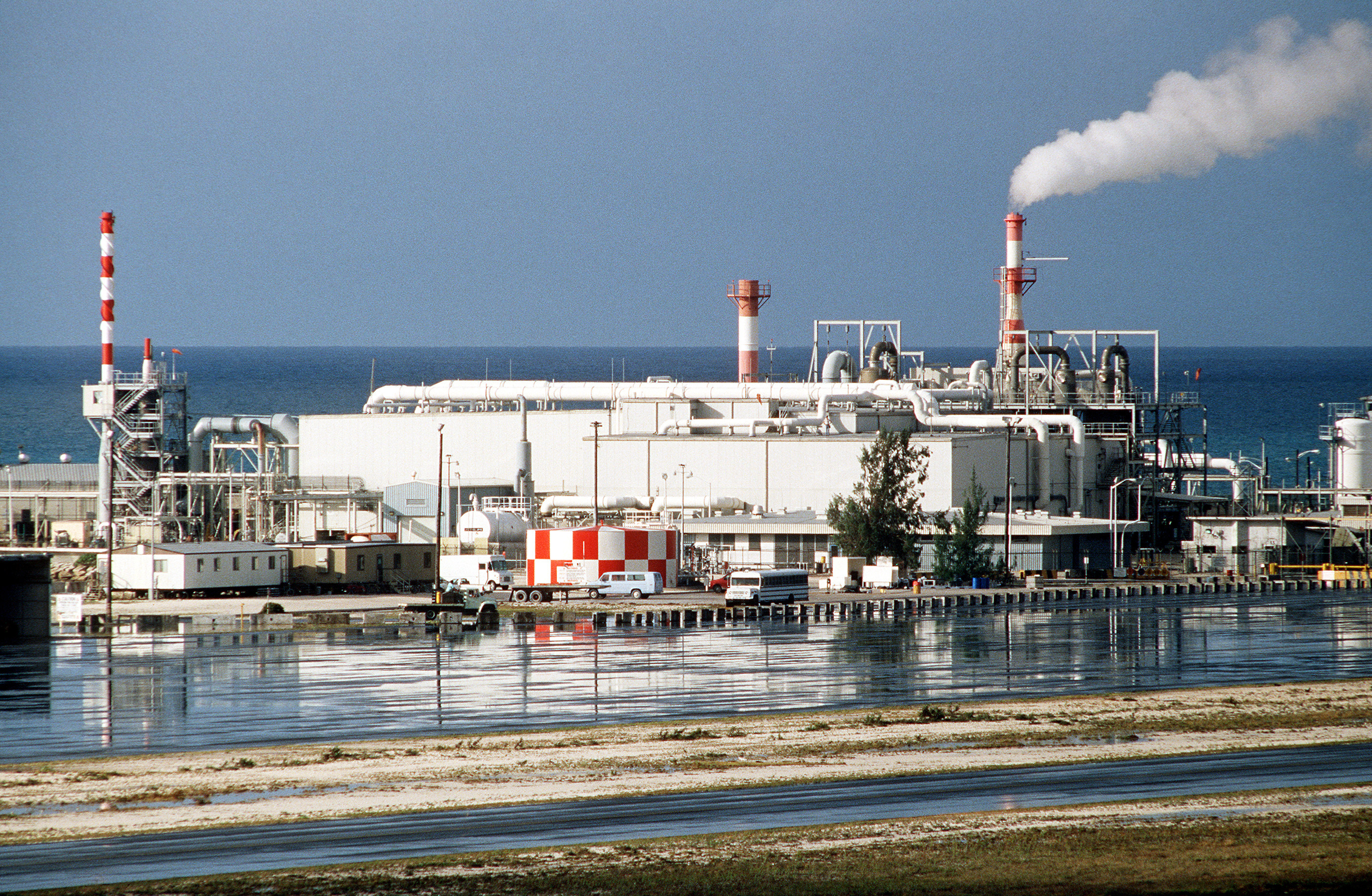
The Johnston Atoll Chemical Agent Disposal System facility in 1990.

Johnston Atoll Chemical Agent Disposal System (JACADS) was the U.S. Army's first chemical munitions disposal facility. It was located on Johnston Island, at Johnston Atoll and completed its mission and ceased operation in 2000.

== Background ==
Chemical weapons at Johnston Atoll — 1990
Agent	Quantity
Sulfur mustard (HD)	578,339.6 pounds (262,330.4 kg)
Sarin (GB)	2,639,462.4 pounds (1,197,240.0 kg)
VX nerve agent	845,418.3 pounds (383,475.3 kg)

Prior to the beginning of destruction operations at JACADS, the atoll held about 6.6% of the entire U.S. stockpile of chemical weapons. Chemical weapons were stockpiled on Johnston Atoll beginning in 1971, including weapons transferred from Okinawa during the 1971 Operation Red Hat. Some of the other weapons stored at the site, including Sarin (GB) and VX Nerve Agent, were shipped from U.S. stockpiles in Germany in 1990. The shipments followed a 1986 agreement between the U.S. and Germany to move the munitions. The remainder of the chemical weapons were a small number of World War II era weapons shipped from the Solomon Islands. In 1985, the U.S. Congress mandated that all chemical weapons stockpiles at Johnston Atoll, mostly mustard and nerve agents, be destroyed.

== History ==
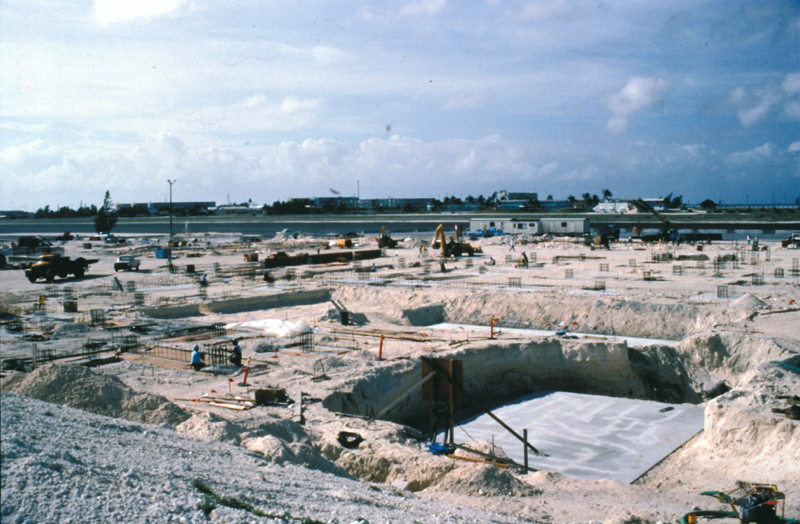
Site excavation early on in the construction of JACADS

Planning for JACADS began in 1981 and initial construction started in 1985–1986. In August 1985, the U.S. Environmental Protection Agency (EPA) issued a 10-year permit to the Army allowing it to construct and operate JACADS. As JACADS was preparing to begin operations, the U.S. Congress passed Public Law 100-456, which required JACADS to complete operational verification testing (OVT) to ensure each type of munition could be disposed of safely. Operations began at JACADS in June 1990, commencing with operational verification testing.

The first weapon disposal took place on June 30, 1990. That day, JACADS became the first U.S. chemical weapons disposal facility. The OVT phase of operations lasted until March 1993. Transition from the testing phase to full-scale operations began in May 1993 and, in August, full-scale operations began. Twice, in 1993 and 1994, the facility had to be evacuated because of hurricanes; operations were delayed for as long as 70 days during these periods.

On November 29, 2000, the last of the chemical weapons at JACADS were disposed of. The last disposal operation destroyed more than 13,000 VX filled land mines. Two years after the last chemical weapons at JACADS were destroyed, the Army submitted the plan to dismantle the facility to the EPA; it was approved in September 2002. Demolition on the 80,000-square-foot (7,400 m^{2}) facility, home to the incinerators, laboratories and control rooms, took place from August to October 2003. In November 2003 a plaque was dedicated to JACADS personnel.

== Disposal program ==
=== Disposal method ===
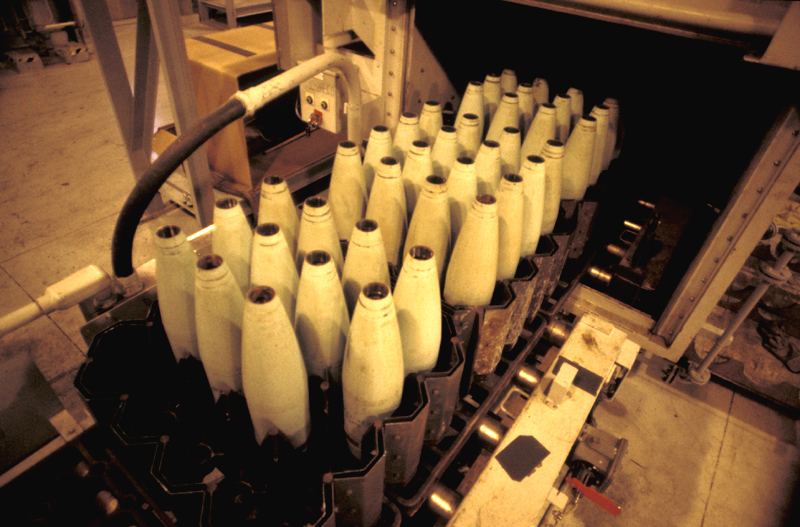
A tray of empty projectile casings after being thermally decontaminated at JACADS

JACADS workers utilized incineration to destroy the chemical agents at Johnston Atoll. After workers loaded the weapons onto a conveyor, automated equipment would take over the process. The equipment removed the explosive component of the weapon and drained the chemical agent. The explosive and chemical agent were then incinerated at high temperature. The metal weapons casings were then thermally decontaminated and scrapped.

=== Munitions destroyed ===
By early 1996, the facility at Johnston Atoll had destroyed about 3.5% of the overall U.S. chemical weapons stockpile. Included in that amount, out of total stockpile of 31,000 tons, was two million pounds of mustard and nerve agents destroyed by JACADS. The disposal program was overseen by Project Manager Gary McCloskey, and during the ten years from 1990–2000 was responsible for the destruction of over 400,000 chemical rockets, projectiles, bombs, mortars, ton containers, and mines. Also destroyed at JACADS were over 2,000 tons of the nerve agents sarin and VX, as well as the blister agent HD. In total, the program at Johnston Atoll destroyed 412,000 individual chemical munitions.

=== Accidents and incidents ===
There were a few chemical weapons related accidents during the period JACADS was in operation. In January 1993, the burster charge on a 105 mm artillery shell ignited. The shell contained World War II-era mustard gas, though none was released and the incident resulted in no injuries. A later incident on March 23, 1994, resulted in the accidental release of sarin gas after a chemical agent line was opened for maintenance without properly purging the line with fuel oil. The incident led to a $122,000 fine against the Army from the EPA. Another incident in November 1994 led to the explosion of a drained chemical rocket during mechanical removal of the fuse, but no leaks were reported.

On December 9, 1993, a spill of about 500 pounds (226 kg) of Sarin (Agent GB) occurred inside the Munitions Demilitarization Building (MDB). There was no agent migration outside the building and the contingency plan was not activated. The facility suspended processing of munitions until investigation of the incident was satisfactorily completed.

The U.S. National Research Council's Committee on Evaluation of Chemical Events at Army Chemical Agent Disposal Facilities was provided, by the Army, with a list of 39 incidents that occurred at JACADS from its opening until its closure. Of those 39 events, 24 were classified as chemical in nature. For example, five days after the last chemical weapons were destroyed at JACADS, VX was detected in ash from the incinerator. The committee's evaluation of JACADS incidents was published in 2002.

== Response and reaction ==
The 1990 shipments of nerve agents from West Germany to JACADS caused several South Pacific nations to express unease. At the 1990 South Pacific Forum in Vanuatu, the island nations of the South Pacific indicated that their concern was that the South Pacific would become a toxic waste dumping ground. Other concerns raised included the security of the shipments, which were refueled at sea and escorted by U.S. guided missile destroyers, while they were en route to Johnston Atoll. In Australia, Prime Minister Bob Hawke drew criticism from some of these island nations for his support of the chemical weapons destruction at Johnston Atoll.

== See also ==
- Operation Red Hat
- Operation Pacer IVY
- Operation Pacer HO
- Operation Steel Box
- U.S. Army Chemical Materials Agency
