= United States chemical weapons program =

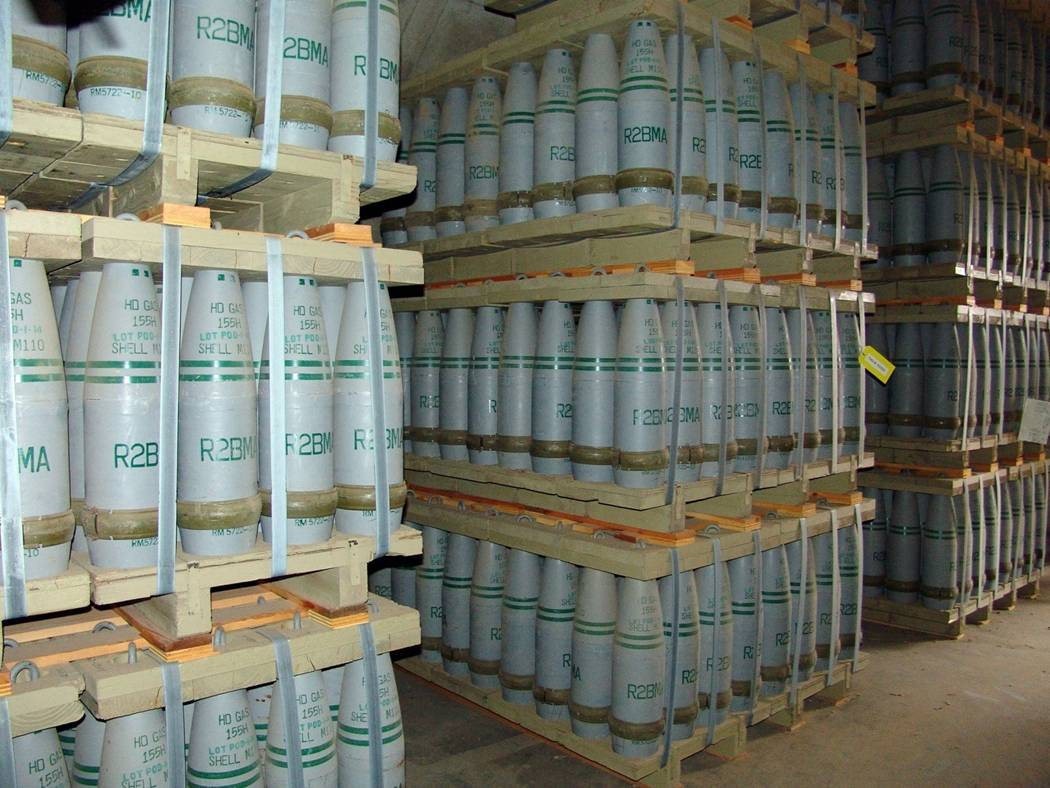
Artillery shells containing mustard gas, a key component of the U.S. Cold War chemical arsenal.

The United States chemical weapons program began in 1917 during World War I with the creation of the U.S. Army's Gas Service Section and effectively ended 73 years later in 1990 with the country's adoption of the Chemical Weapons Convention (signed 1993; entered into force, 1997). Destruction of stockpiled chemical weapons began in 1986 and was completed on July 7, 2023.

As part of the widespread use of chemical weapons in World War I, the U.S. manufactured and used phosgene and mustard gas on the Western Front although these stockpiles represented 4% of the World War I total. In World War II, chemical warfare by or against U.S. forces was practically nonexistent, however the Western Allies, Nazi Germany, and Empire of Japan possessed large chemical stockpiles. In the 1943 Germany air raid on Bari, Italy, the SS John Harvey was hit, unintentionally releasing its secret cargo of mustard gas. Operation Downfall, the unrealized U.S. plan to invade the core islands of Japan in 1945, considered U.S. and Japanese use of chemical weapons.

During the Cold War, the U.S. stockpiled large amounts of mustard and the nerve agents sarin and VX. The Central Intelligence Agency's MKUltra program investigated psychochemical warfare. The Vietnam War saw widespread U.S. use of tear gas and defoliants, including the controversial Agent Orange. Vietnam operations were also alleged to have used sarin in Operation Tailwind, and BZ incapacitating agent. The Dugway sheep incident and the anti-war movement prompted president Richard Nixon to unilaterally renounce the first use of chemical weapons and renounce all offensive use and development of the United States biological weapons program in 1969. The U.S. also forward-deployed chemical weapons, including in U.S.-administered Okinawa and West Germany. The weapons were withdrawn to Johnston Atoll in the 1971 Operation Red Hat and 1990 Operation Steel Box respectively.

As the Cold War ended, the U.S. began destruction of its stockpile in 1986 and signed the Chemical Weapons Convention at its opening in 1993. The chemical stockpile, declared in 1997 and destroyed by 2023, included over 30,000 tons of chemical agents stored within almost 3.5 million munitions, and well over 22,500 tons of agents in other containers. The U.S. Army Medical Research Institute of Chemical Defense (USAMRICD), at Aberdeen Proving Ground, Maryland, continues to operate. The U.S. Army's Chemical Corps has since transitioned to CBRN defense, and the employment of smoke, obscurant, and flame capabilities.

== History ==
The U.S. had participated in the formulations of the Hague Conventions of 1899 and 1907 which was the start of international law. These conventions allowed different leaders of the world to express how they felt about certain situations concerning war. The Hague Convention of 1899 was the beginning of banning chemical warfare. The Hague Convention of 1907 was to discuss how life was since the previous convention.

World War I

In World War I, the U.S. established its own chemical weapons research facility and produced its own chemical munitions. It produced 5,770 metric tons of these weapons, including 1,400 metric tons of phosgene and 175 metric tons of mustard gas. This was about 4% of the total chemical weapons produced for that war and only just over 1% of the era's most effective weapon, mustard gas. (U.S. troops suffered less than 6% of gas casualties.) The U.S. also established the First Gas Regiment, which left Washington, D.C., on Christmas Day, 1917, and arrived at the front in May 1918. During its time in France, the First Gas Regiment used phosgene in a number of attacks.

The United States began large-scale production of an improved vesicant gas known as Lewisite, for use in an offensive planned for early 1919. Lewisite was a major American contribution to the chemical weapon arsenal of World War I, although it was not actually used in the field during World War I. It was developed by Captain Winford Lee Lewis of the U.S. Chemical Warfare Service in 1917. The Germans later claimed that they had manufactured it in 1917 prior to the American discovery because at this time English troops were brought face to face with shells that had a very liquid substance. This oily substance later confused the troops when side effects were occurring. The chemicals in the shells left burns on their skin, ripped through clothes, and marinated in the ground. By the time of the armistice on 11 November 1918, a plant near Willoughby, Ohio, was producing 10 tons per day of the substance, for a total of about 150 tons. It is uncertain what effect this new chemical agent would have had on the battlefield, however, as it degrades in moist conditions.

After the war, the U.S. was party to the Washington Arms Conference Treaty of 1922 which would have banned chemical weapons but failed because it was rejected by France. The U.S. continued to stockpile chemical weapons, eventually exceeding 30,000 tons of material.

=== World War II ===
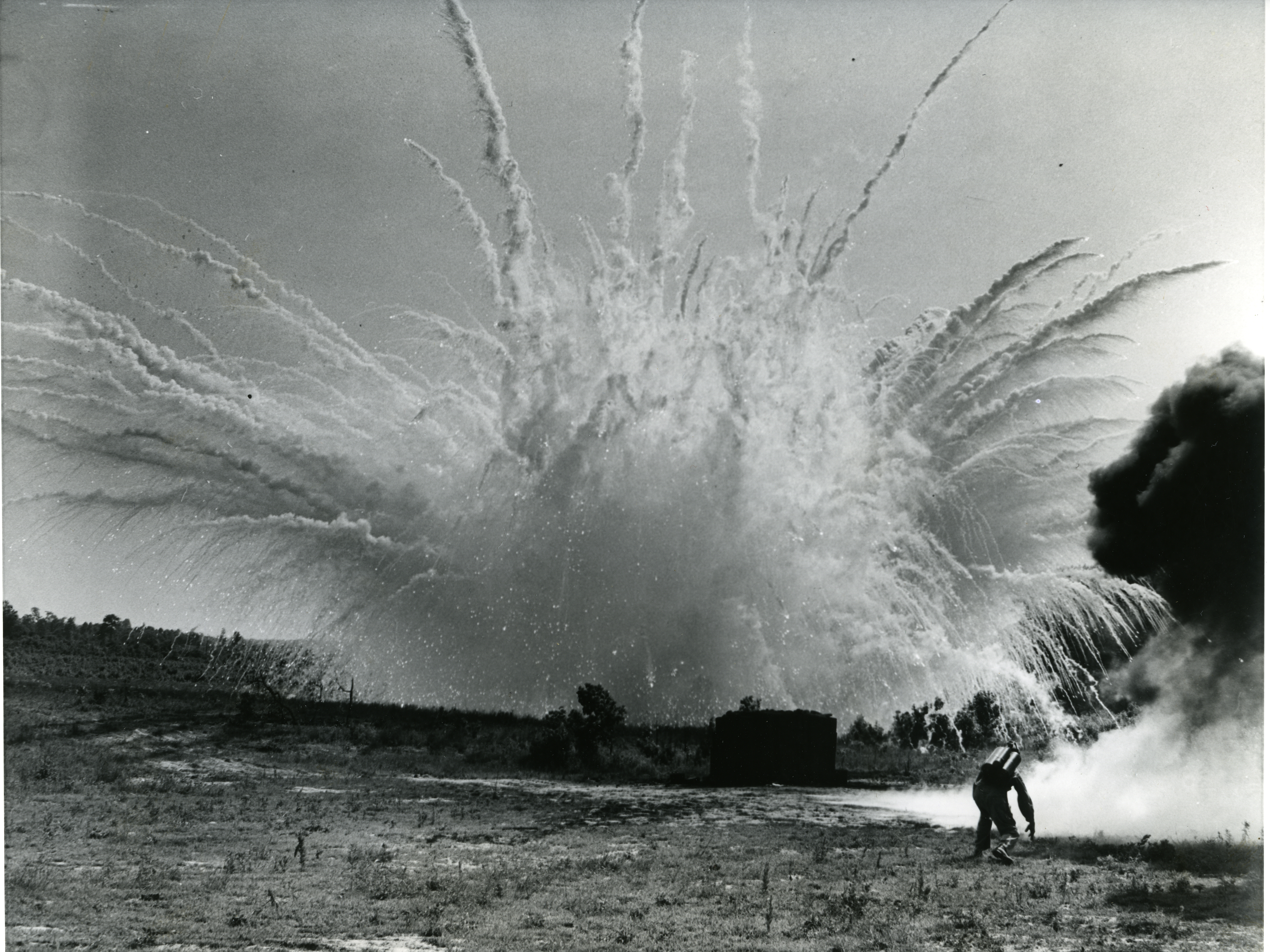
A white phosphorus munition explodes and a portable flamethrower can be seen during a demonstration at Edgewood Arsenal, 1943.

Chemical weapons were not used by the U.S. or the other Allies during World War II; however, quantities of such weapons were deployed to Europe for use in case Germany initiated chemical warfare. At least one accident occurred: On the night of December 2, 1943, German Junkers Ju 88 bombers attacked the port of Bari in Southern Italy, sinking several American ships – among them John Harvey, which was carrying mustard gas. The presence of the gas was highly classified, and authorities ashore had no knowledge of it – which increased the number of fatalities, since physicians, who had no idea that they were dealing with the effects of mustard gas, prescribed treatment not consistent with those suffering from exposure and immersion. According to the U.S. military account, "Sixty-nine deaths were attributed in whole or in part to the mustard gas, most of them American merchant seamen" out of 628 mustard gas military casualties.^{[Navy 2006]}^{[Niderost]} Civilian casualties were not recorded. The whole affair was kept secret at the time and for many years after the war. Large quantities of chemical weapons were also deployed to India, from where they could have been delivered to Japan by B-29 bombers. At the end of the war, over 50,000 mustard gas bombs, 10,000 phosgene bombs and other chemical munitions were dumped into deep water in the Bay of Bengal.

The US military conducted experiments with chemical weapons like lewisite and mustard gas on Japanese American, Puerto Rican and African Americans in the US military in World War II to see how non-white races would react to being mustard gassed, with Rollin Edwards describing it as "It felt like you were on fire, Guys started screaming and hollering and trying to break out. And then some of the guys fainted. And finally they opened the door and let us out, and the guys were just, they were in bad shape." and "It took all the skin off your hands. Your hands just rotted". White soldiers were used as "normal" control group.

==== Operation Downfall ====
Operation Downfall was the unrealized Allied plan for a mid-1945 invasion of the main Japanese islands of Kyushu and Honshu. The U.S. military considered the use of chemical weapons by themselves and Japanese forces.

Fears of "an Okinawa from one end of Japan to the other" encouraged the Allies to consider unconventional weapons, including chemical warfare. Widespread chemical warfare was considered against Japan's population and food crops. While large quantities of gas munitions were manufactured and plans were drawn, it is unlikely they would have been used. Richard B. Frank states that when the proposal reached Truman in June 1945, he vetoed the use of chemical weapons against personnel; their use against crops, however, remained under consideration. According to Edward J. Drea, the strategic use of chemical weapons on a massive scale was not seriously studied or proposed by any senior American leader; rather, they debated the tactical use of chemical weapons against pockets of Japanese resistance.

Fear of Japanese retaliation [to chemical weapon use] lessened because by the end of the war Japan's ability to deliver gas by air or long-range guns had all but disappeared. In 1944 Ultra revealed that the Japanese doubted their ability to retaliate against United States use of gas. “Every precaution must be taken not to give the enemy cause for a pretext to use gas,” the commanders were warned. So fearful were the Japanese leaders that they planned to ignore isolated tactical use of gas in the home islands by the US forces because they feared escalation.

— Skates

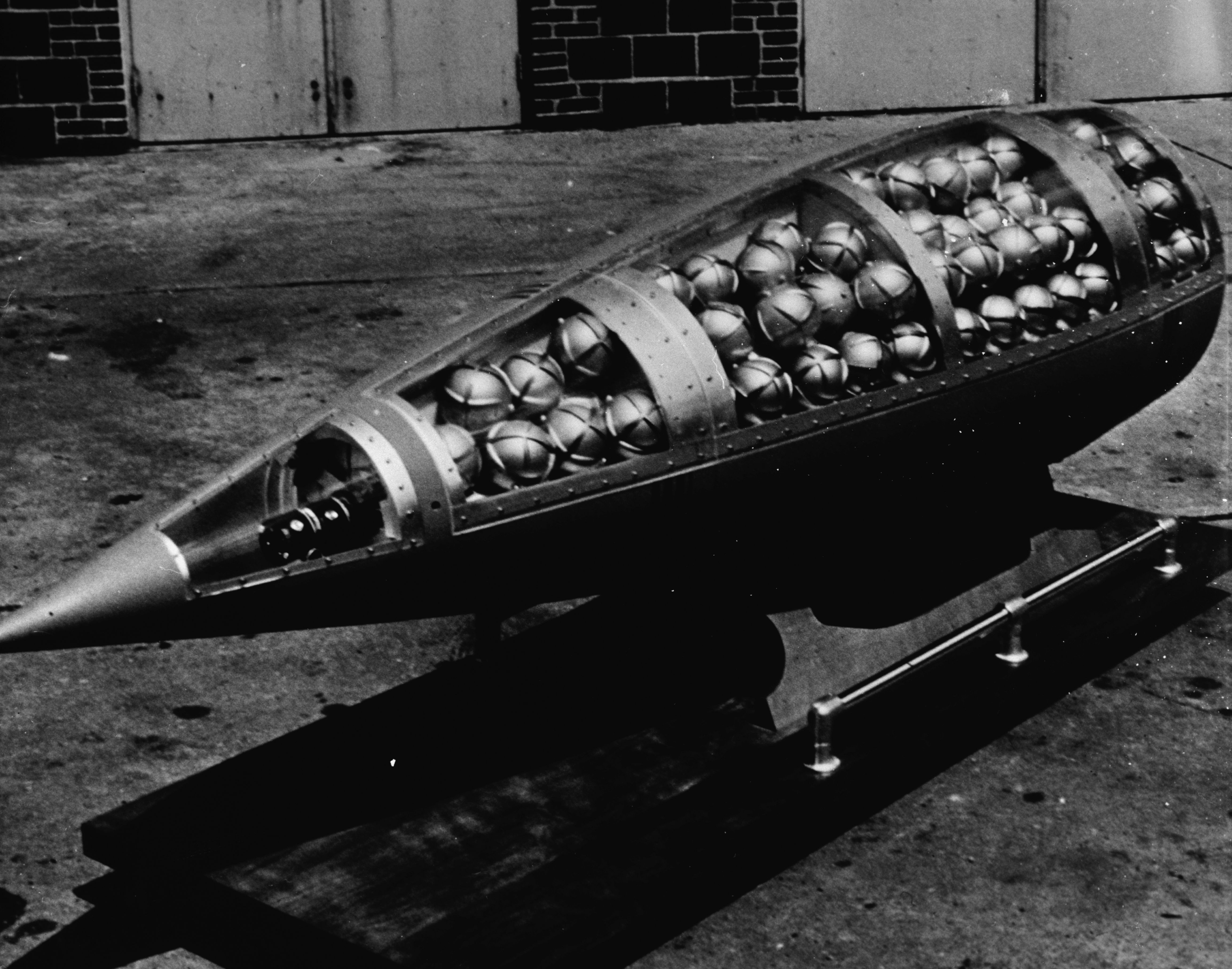
Honest John missile warhead cutaway, showing M134 Sarin bomblets (photo c. 1960)

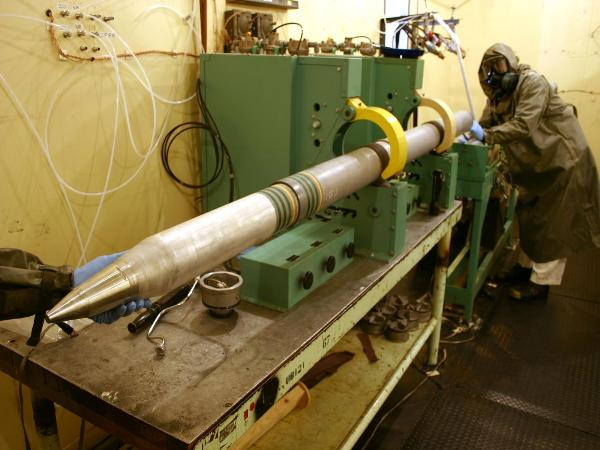
An M55 rocket, used to deliver sarin or VX nerve agents.

=== Cold War ===
After the war, the Allies recovered German artillery shells containing three new nerve agents developed by the Germans (Tabun, Sarin, and Soman), prompting further research into nerve agents by all of the former Allies. Thousands of American soldiers were exposed to chemical warfare agents during Cold War testing programs (see Edgewood Arsenal human experiments), as well as in accidents. In 1968, one such accident killed approximately 6,400 sheep when an agent drifted out of Dugway Proving Ground during a test.

The North Koreans and Chinese have alleged that chemical and biological weapons were used by the United States in the Korean War; but the United States' denial is supported by Russian archival documents.

The U.S. also investigated a wide range of possible nonlethal, psychobehavioral chemical incapacitating agents including psychedelic indoles such as lysergic acid diethylamide (also experimenting to see if it could be used for effective mind control) and marijuana derivatives, certain tranquilizers like ketamine or fentanyl, as well as several glycolate anticholinergics. One of the anticholinergic compounds, 3-quinuclidinyl benzilate, was assigned the NATO code BZ and was weaponized at the beginning of the 1960s for possible battlefield use. This agent was allegedly employed by American troops as a counterinsurgency weapon in the Vietnam War but the U.S. maintains that this agent never saw operational use. Chinese historians allege extensive U.S. use of BZ. The U.S. was alleged to have used sarin in Laos during Operation Tailwind, against North Vietnamese and Pathet Lao forces, and potentially American defectors.

The growing protests over the U.S. role in the Vietnam War, the use of defoliants there, and the use of riot control agents both in Southeast Asia and inside the U.S. (as well as heightened concern for the environment) all gradually increased public hostility in the U.S. toward chemical weapons in the 1960s. Three events particularly galvanized public attention: a 1968 sheep-kill incident at Dugway Proving Ground, Operation Cut Holes and Sink ‘Em (CHASE) — a program involving disposal of unwanted munitions at sea — and a 1969 accident with sarin at Okinawa.

=== Renunciation of first use ===
On November 25, 1969, President Richard Nixon unilaterally renounced the first use of chemical weapons and renounced all methods of biological warfare. He issued a unilateral decree halting production and transport of chemical weapons which remains in effect. From 1967 to 1970 in Operation CHASE, the U.S. disposed of chemical weapons by sinking ships laden with the weapons in the deep Atlantic. The U.S. began to research safer disposal methods for chemical weapons in the 1970s, destroying several thousand tons of mustard gas by incineration at Rocky Mountain Arsenal and nearly 4,200 tons of nerve agent by chemical neutralization at Tooele Army Depot and Rocky Mountain Arsenal.

The U.S. entered the Geneva Protocol in 1975 at the same time it ratified the Biological Weapons Convention. This was the first operative international treaty on chemical weapons that the United States was party to.

In May 1991, President George H. W. Bush unilaterally committed the United States to destroying all chemical weapons and renounced the right to chemical weapon retaliation. In 1993, the United States signed the Chemical Weapons Convention, which required the destruction of all chemical weapon agents, dispersal systems, and chemical weapons production facilities by April 2012. In 1997, the United States formally agreed to destroy its stockpile by ratifying the Chemical Weapons Convention. The international treaty bans the use of all chemical weapons and aims to eliminate them throughout the world.

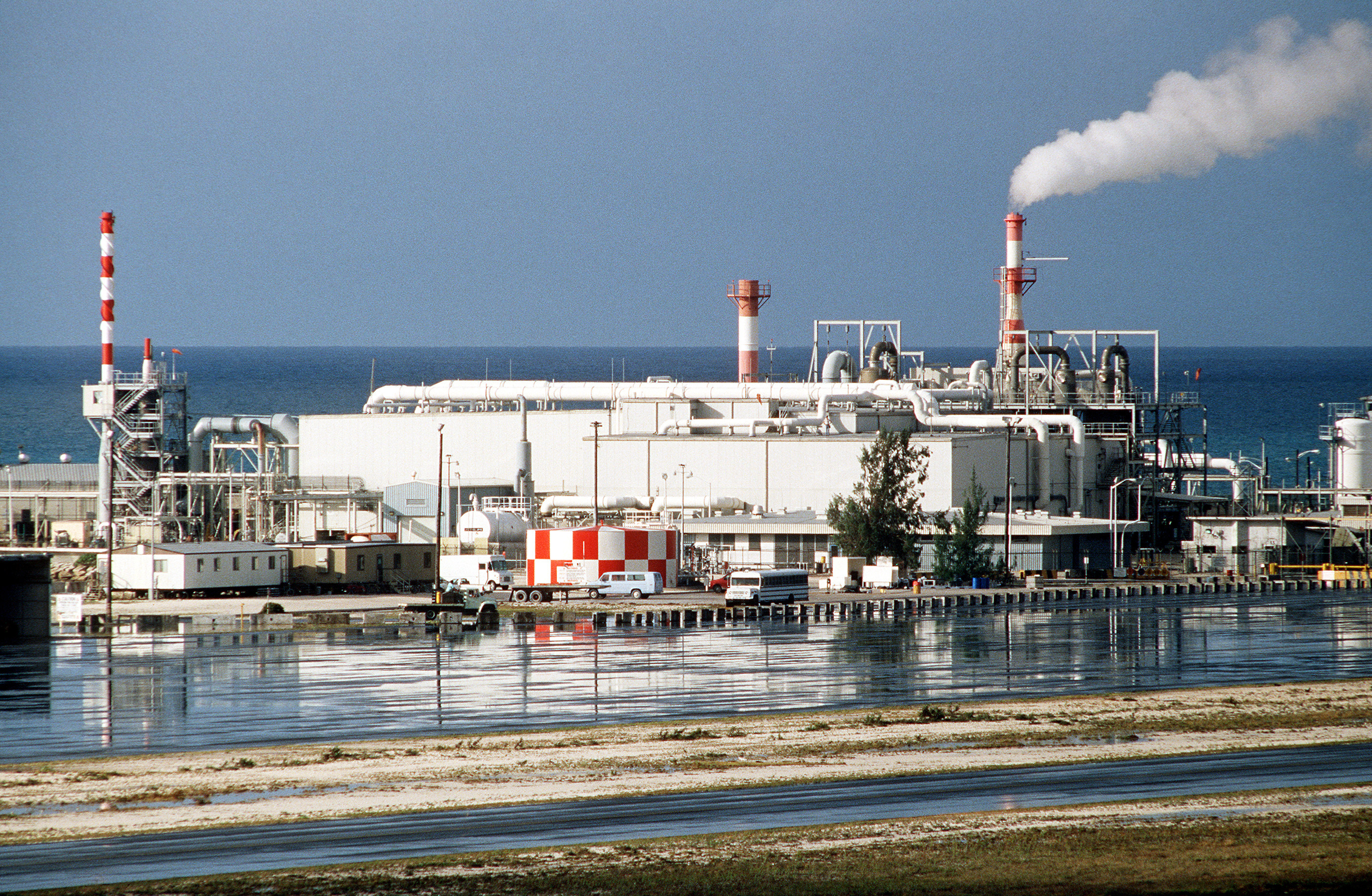
The Johnston Atoll Chemical Agent Disposal System during "Operation Steel Box" (aka "Operation Golden Python"). This 1990 joint U.S.-West German operation moved 100,000 U.S. chemical weapons from Germany to Johnston Atoll.

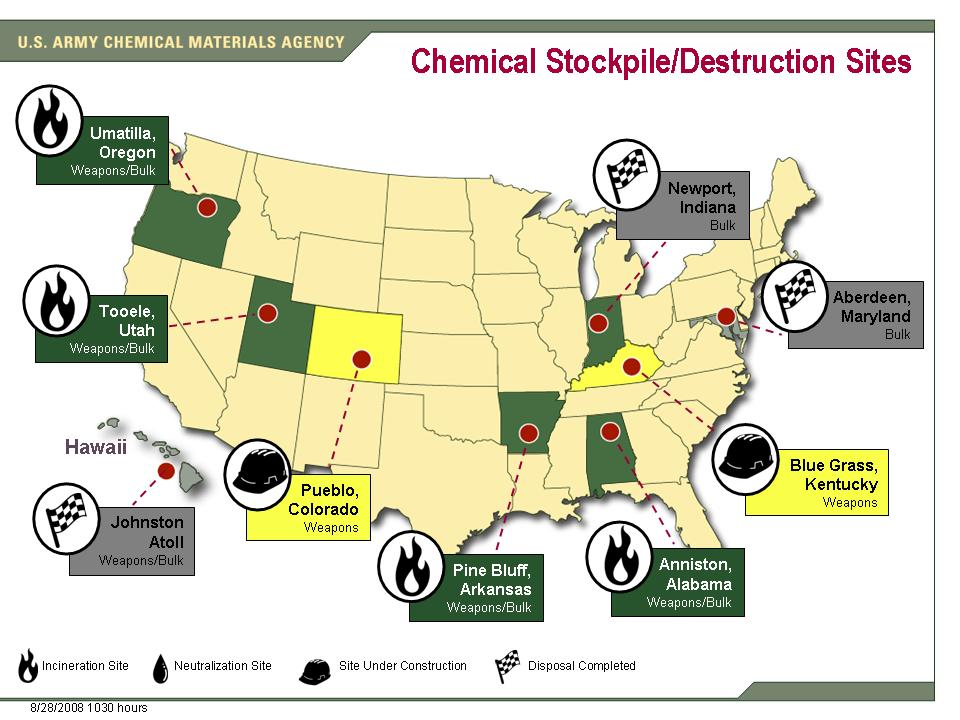
Map of chemical stockpile sites in 2008.

=== Decommissioning and destruction ===
The U.S. began stockpile reductions in the 1980s, removing some outdated munitions and destroying its entire stock of BZ beginning in 1988. In June 1990, Johnston Atoll Chemical Agent Disposal System began destruction of chemical agents stored on Johnston Atoll in the Pacific, seven years before the Chemical Weapons Convention came into effect. In 1990, 1,197 tons of sarin, 383 tons of VX, and 262 metric tons of mustard gas were stored at Johnston Atoll.

In 1986, President Ronald Reagan made an agreement with Chancellor Helmut Kohl to remove the U.S. stockpile of chemical weapons from Germany. As part of Operation Steel Box, in July 1990, two ships were loaded with over 100,000 shells containing GB and VX taken from U.S. Army weapons storage depots such as Miesau and then-classified ammunition FSTS (forward storage/transportation sites) and transported from Bremerhaven, Germany, to Johnston Atoll in the Pacific, a 46-day nonstop journey.

U.S. chemical weapons had previously moved to Johnston Atoll from Okinawa in 1971 under Operation Red Hat.

The U.S. prohibition on the transport of chemical weapons as part of the Chemical Weapons Convention meant that destruction facilities had to be constructed at each of the U.S. nine storage facilities.

By 1993, the U.S. Army's Chemical Corps had transitioned to CBRN defense, and the employment of smoke, obscurant, and flame capabilities.

Congress established the Assembled Chemical Weapons Assessment (ACWA) program in 1996 to safely test and demonstrate at least two alternative technologies to the baseline incineration process for the destruction of the nation’s remaining stockpile of assembled chemical weapons. Beginning in 1999, ACWA was tasked by the Secretary of Defense to demonstrate six incineration alternatives to destroy the remaining U.S. chemical weapons stockpile stored at the Blue Grass Army Depot in Kentucky and the U.S. Army Pueblo Chemical Depot in Colorado, the final two stockpiles in the United States. By 2000, ACWA had demonstrated six technologies. Neutralization followed by biotreatment was selected for the Colorado stockpile, and neutralization followed by supercritical water oxidation was selected for the Kentucky stockpile.

The U.S. met the first three of the treaty's four deadlines, destroying 45% of its stockpile of chemical weapons by 2007. By January 2012, the final treaty deadline, the United States had destroyed 89.75% of the original stockpile. Only the stockpiles in Kentucky and Colorado remained. The final chemical weapon was not destroyed until July 7, 2023. The chemical weapons destroyed, declared in 1997, included over 30,000 tons of chemical agents stored within almost 3.5 million munitions, and well over 22,500 tons of agents in other containers.

== Treaties ==
The United States was a party to some of the earliest modern chemical weapons ban treaties, the Hague Conventions of 1899 and 1907 and the Washington Arms Conference Treaty of 1922 although this treaty was unsuccessful. The U.S. ratified the Geneva Protocol which banned the use of chemical and biological weapons in interstate warfare on January 22, 1975. In 1989 and 1990, the U.S. and the Soviet Union entered an agreement to end their chemical weapons programs, including "binary weapons". The United States ratified the 1993 Chemical Weapons Convention, which came into force in April 1997. This banned the possession of most types of chemical weapons. The United States and Russia possess the largest remaining chemical stockpiles among Convention members according to the Centre for Arms Control and Non-proliferation, as of 2014. The convention also banned chemical weapons development, and requires the destruction of existing stockpiles, precursor chemicals, production facilities and weapon delivery systems.

== Chemical weapons disposal ==
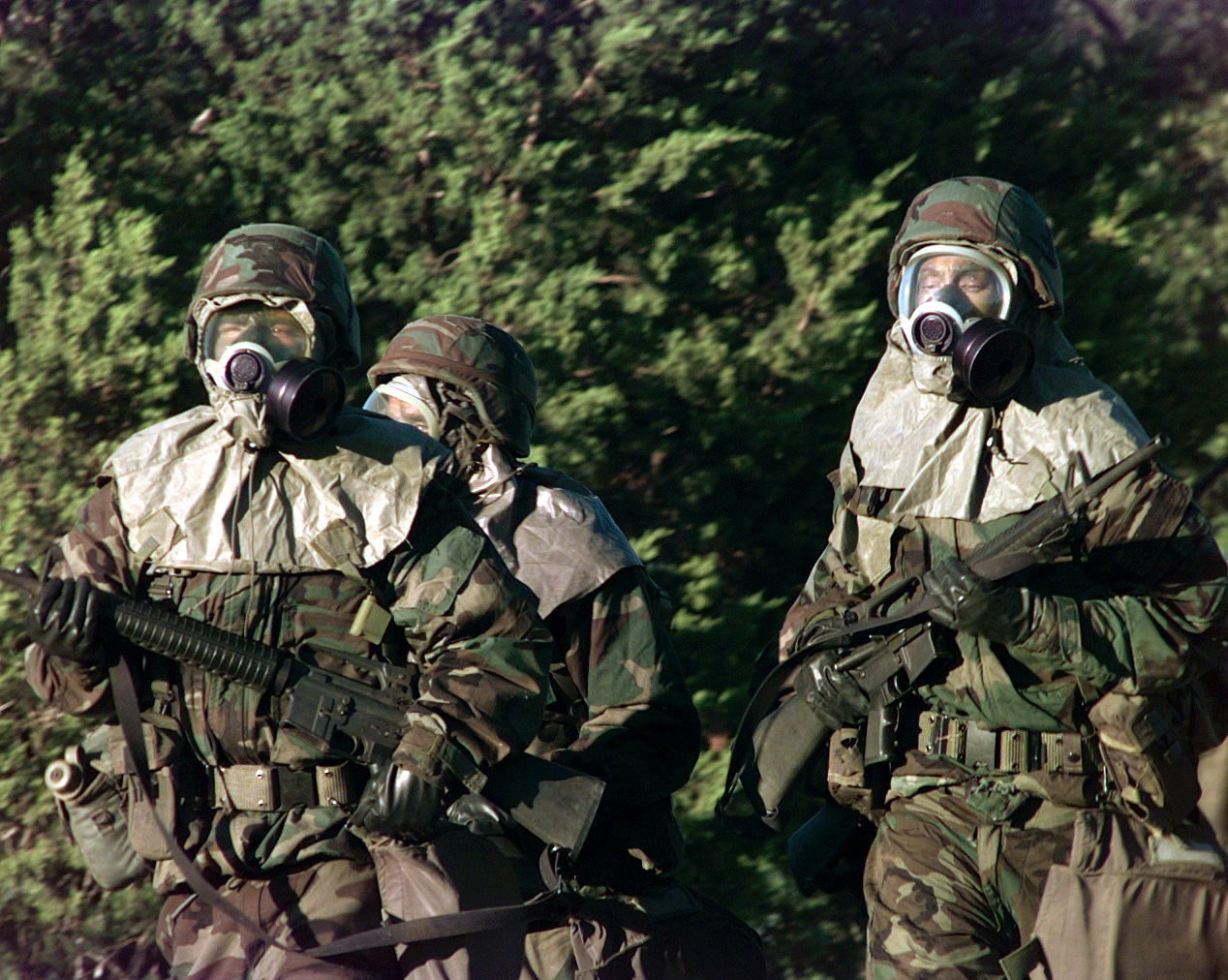
U.S. soldiers wearing full chemical protection.

At the time that the chemical weapons treaty came in force, the U.S. stored its chemical weapons at eight U.S. Army installations within the Continental United States (CONUS). The stockpiles were maintained in exclusion zones at the following Department of Army installations (the percentages shown are reflections of amount by weight):

- Tooele Army Depot (TEAD), Utah (42.3% of total stockpile)
- Pine Bluff Arsenal (PBA), Arkansas (12%)
- Umatilla Depot Activity (UMDA), Oregon (11.6%)
- Pueblo Chemical Depot (PCD), Colorado (9.9%)
- Anniston Army Depot (ANAD), Alabama (7.1%)
- Aberdeen Proving Ground (APG), Maryland (5%)
- Newport Army Ammunition Plant (NAAP), Indiana (3.9%)
- Blue Grass Army Depot (BGAD), Kentucky (1.6%).

The remaining 6.6% was located on Johnston Atoll in the Pacific Ocean.

According to the U.S. Army Chemical Materials Agency, by January 2012 the United States had destroyed 89.75% of the original stockpile of nearly 31,100 metric tons (34,300 tons) of nerve and mustard agents declared in 1997. The U.S. disposed of the more dangerous modern chemical weapons before starting the destruction of its older mustard gas stockpile which presented additional difficulties due to the poor condition of some of the shells. Of the weapons destroyed up to 2006, 500 tons were mustard gas and the majority were other agents such as VX and sarin (GB) (86% of the latter was destroyed by April 2006). 14,000 metric tons (15,400 tons) of prohibited weapons had been destroyed by June 2007 to meet the Phase III quota and deadline.

The original commitment in Phase III required all countries to have 45 percent of the chemical stockpiles destroyed by April 2004. Anticipating the failure to meet this deadline, the Bush administration in September 2003 requested a new deadline of December 2007 for Phase III and announced a probable need for an extension until April 2012 for Phase IV, total destruction (requests for deadline extensions cannot formally be made until 12 months before the original deadline). This extension procedure spelled out in the treaty has been utilized by other countries, including Russia and the unnamed "state party". Although April 2012 is the latest date allowed by the treaty, the U.S. also noted that this deadline may not be met due to environmental challenges and the U.S. decision to destroy leaking individual chemical shells before bulk storage chemical weapons.

The primary remaining chemical weapon storage facilities in the U.S. became Pueblo Chemical Depot in Colorado and Blue Grass Army Depot in Kentucky. These two facilities held 10.25% of the U.S. 1997 declared stockpile and destruction operations are under the Program Executive Office, Assembled Chemical Weapons Alternatives. Other non-stockpile agents (usually test kits) or old buried munitions are occasionally found and are sometimes destroyed in place. Pueblo and Blue Grass constructed plants to test novel methods of disposal. Chemical stockpile destruction in Colorado was initiated in March 2015 by the Explosive Destruction System located on the Pueblo Chemical Depot. The destruction facility for Pueblo began disposal operations in September 2016, while the destruction facility for Blue Grass began disposal operations in June 2019. Both Pueblo and Blue Grass were scheduled to complete by the Chemical Weapons Convention treaty commitment of Sept. 30, 2023. U.S. Public Law mandates stockpile destruction by Dec. 31, 2023.

In 1988–1990, the destruction of munitions containing BZ, a non-lethal hallucinating agent occurred at Pine Bluff Chemical Activity in Arkansas. Hawthorne Army Depot in Nevada destroyed all M687 chemical artillery shells and 458 metric tons of binary precursor chemicals by July 1999. Operations were completed at Johnston Atoll Chemical Agent Disposal System, where all 640 metric tons of chemical agents were destroyed by 2000, as well as at Edgewood Chemical Activity in Maryland, with 1,472 metric tons of agents destroyed by February 2006. All DF and QL, chemical weapons precursors, were destroyed in 2006 at Pine Bluff. Newport Chemical Depot in Indiana began destruction operations in May, 2005 and completed operations on August 8, 2008, disposing of 1,152 tonnes of agents. Pine Bluff completed destruction of 3,850 tons of weapons on November 12, 2010. Anniston Chemical Activity in Alabama completed disposal on September 22, 2011. Umatilla Chemical Depot in Oregon finished disposal on October 25, 2011. Tooele Chemical Demilitarization Facility at Deseret Chemical Depot in Utah finished disposal on January 21, 2012.

Blue Grass Army Depot in Kentucky finished disposal on July 7, 2023 marking the destruction of all chemical weapons stockpiles declared to the Organisation for the Prohibition of Chemical Weapons, the international body implementing the CWC. The final weapon to be destroyed was a sarin nerve agent-filled M55 rocket. The total cost for the program to destroy chemical weapons was over $40 billion.

== See also ==
- Outline of U.S. chemical weapons
- M23 chemical mine
- Rocky Mountain Arsenal
- United States and weapons of mass destruction
- Program Executive Office, Assembled Chemical Weapons Alternatives
