= Pueblo Chemical Agent-Destruction Pilot Plant =

Chemical weapons destruction facility

The Pueblo Chemical Agent-Destruction Pilot Plant (PCAPP) is a chemical weapons destruction facility built to destroy the chemical weapons stockpile stored at the former U.S. Army Pueblo Chemical Depot (PCD) in southeastern Colorado. The stockpile originally contained 2,613 U.S. tons of mustard agent in 155 mm projectiles, 105 mm projectiles, and 4.2-inch mortar rounds. The weapons had been stored at the 23,000-acre (93-km²) depot since the 1950s.

On June 16, 2023, the main plant at PCAPP destroyed its last munition, a 4.2-inch mortar round. On June 22, 2023, the last munition in the stockpile of chemical weapons in Colorado, an overpacked 155 mm projectile containing mustard agent, was destroyed using a Static Detonation Chamber (SDC). The last munition in the declared U.S. stockpile was destroyed in July 2023 in Kentucky.

PCAPP used neutralization followed by biotreatment to destroy the majority of the stockpile, and SDC technology to augment the main plant. Non-contaminated energetics removed from the munitions as part of the destruction process were destroyed in the Anniston, Alabama, SDC.

Destruction of this stockpile was a requirement of the Chemical Weapons Convention, an international treaty to which the United States is a party. The Organisation for the Prohibition of Chemical Weapons (OPCW) is the implementing body of the Chemical Weapons Convention and monitored the progress of the nation's declared destruction programs. The Program Executive Office, Assembled Chemical Weapons Alternatives (PEO ACWA) oversaw the safe and environmentally compliant destruction of the nation’s chemical weapons stockpile and is now responsible for closing the plants in Colorado and Kentucky.

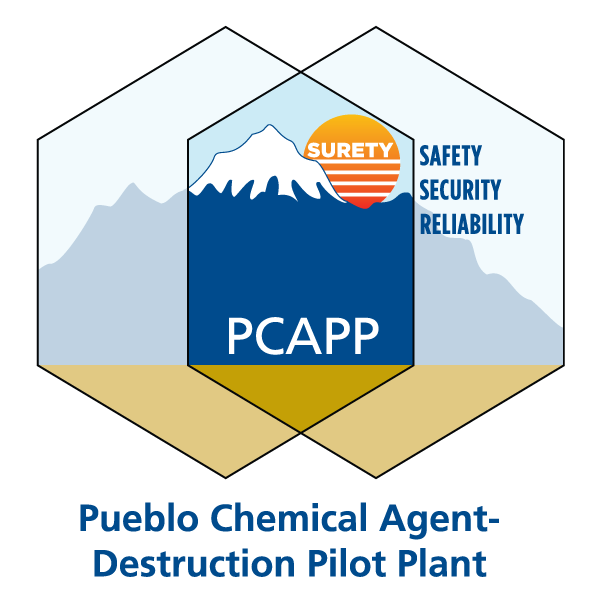
PCAPP logo

The Bechtel Pueblo Team (BPT; consisting of Bechtel National, Inc.; Amentum; Battelle Memorial Institute; and GP Strategies) designed, constructed, pilot-tested, operated, and is closing PCAPP.

== Planning of activities ==
Agent destruction began in 2016 and concluded on June 22, 2023. Closure activities (shutdown, dismantling, and restoration of site) will be complete in Fiscal Year 2028.

In 2010, the Pueblo Chemical Depot, in conjunction with the PEO ACWA program, completed an environmental assessment (EA) to meet the requirements of the National Environmental Policy Act, or NEPA, and Title 32 Code of Federal Regulations Part 651 regarding the construction and operation of the U.S. Army's Explosive Destruction System (EDS) and/or other explosive destruction technologies (EDT), at the U.S. Army Pueblo Chemical Depot in Colorado. The EA was withdrawn, and a new EA was completed in 2012. The new EA focused on the use of EDT for destroying overpacked and rejected munitions. In April 2013, Program Executive Officer Conrad F. Whyne announced his selection of EDS to augment PCAPP for the safe destruction of chemical munitions unsuited for processing by the main plant's automated equipment. In spring 2018, the decision was made to end EDS and utilize three SDC units to augment the main plant.

== History of chemical demilitarization in Colorado ==
Decade	Milestones
1950s	Pueblo Ordnance Depot (later redesignated as the U.S. Army Pueblo Chemical Depot) began storage of chemical weapons containing mustard agent.
1980s	Public Law 99-145 designated the U.S. Army responsible for the destruction of the U.S. chemical weapons stockpile.
1990s	The United States Congress established the PEO ACWA program under the Department of Defense (DOD) to identify and demonstrate alternatives to incineration.; Congress ratified the Chemical Weapons Convention treaty, which directs all member nations to destroy their chemical weapons and production facilities.
2000s	DOD selected neutralization followed by biotreatment as the destruction method for the Colorado stockpile.; The Bechtel Pueblo Team was awarded a contract to design, build, and operate PCAPP.; PCAPP groundbreaking was held.; Design work and preliminary construction were suspended pending evaluation of cost reduction measures.; PCAPP redesign was approved by the DOD, and construction work resumed.; The Secretary of Defense affirmed to Congress that there were no options by which the U.S. could destroy 100 percent of its chemical stockpile by the extended Chemical Weapons Convention treaty deadline of April 29, 2012.; The DOD accepted the final design for PCAPP.; Above-ground vertical construction began with the erection of the Multipurpose Building.; Public Laws 110-116 and 110-181 were enacted, mandating the destruction of the chemical stockpile by April 2012 or, in no case, later than December 31, 2017.; PCAPP received the U.S. Department of Labor Occupational Safety and Health Administration Voluntary Protection Program Star Status certification in recognition of safety excellence.; PCAPP construction was more than halfway complete, with interior and exterior work ongoing in multiple buildings, including the Agent Processing Building, Control and Support Building, Enhanced Reconfiguration Building, Biotreatment Electrical Building, Entry Control Facility, Immobilized Cell Bioreactor and Off-Gas Foundation Pads, and Munitions and Energetic Service Magazines.
2010s	Construction continued with interior and exterior work ongoing in multiple buildings, including the Agent Processing Building, Control and Support Building, Enhanced Reconfiguration Building, Biotreatment Electrical Building, Multipurpose Building, Filter Press Building, PCAPP Medical Clinic, Entry Control Facility, Laboratory Facility, Immobilized Cell Bioreactor, Brine Reduction System, Off Gas Foundation Pads, and Munitions and Energetics Service Magazines.; The systemization phase began at PCAPP. Construction teams turned over the first subsystems to the start-up groups for systemization testing and commissioning to begin to prepare the facilities for chemical weapons destruction operations.; To meet the requirements of the National Environmental Policy Act (NEPA) and Title 32 Code of Federal Regulations Part 651, PEO ACWA, in conjunction with the U.S. Army Pueblo Chemical Depot, completed an environmental assessment regarding the possible use of EDTs in Pueblo. Following a public comment period and extensive review by DOD leadership, the environmental assessment is withdrawn.; As part of systematizing the facility, Assembled Chemical Weapons Alternatives Test Equipment arrived for practice and training use.; PCAPP was formally notified by the U.S. Department of Labor's Occupational Safety and Health Administration (OSHA) that the PCAPP project was re-certified as a Star Worksite under OSHA's Voluntary Protection Program.; In April 2012, Pueblo Chemical Depot and PEO ACWA completed an environmental assessment to meet the requirements of the NEPA and Title 32 Code of Federal Regulations Part 651 to address any potential impacts of the installation and operation of EDT at the depot. The environmental assessment concluded that the installation and operation of an EDT would have no significant environmental impacts. A draft Finding of No Significant Impact was prepared and provided for public comment for a 60-day period. It was concluded that no additional analysis was necessary for the proposed action under NEPA.; On December 12, 2012, PCAPP declared construction complete and moved into the systemization phase of the project.; On April 18, 2013, Program Executive Officer Conrad F. Whyne announced his selection of the U.S. Army's EDS to augment PCAPP. The decision followed a lengthy review of several EDTs designed for the safe destruction of chemical munitions unsuited for processing by the main plant's automated equipment.; Construction began and was completed on the PCAPP EDS site, located at the U.S. Army Pueblo Chemical Depot, in 2014. The first of two EDS units arrived on site, aligning with the completion of specially designed environmental enclosures that will house them for added protection.; Provisional Operations, a two-month period in which operations and maintenance staff practice training with simulated munitions and agents, began at PCAPP in 2014. This extensive training is conducted on a large scale to ensure employees are better prepared for plant operations.; Chemical stockpile destruction in Colorado was initiated on March 18, 2015, by the EDS, located on the U.S. Army Pueblo Chemical Depot near PCAPP. This event marked the first step towards eliminating the final 10 percent of the U.S. chemical weapons stockpile.; In 2015, the Bechtel Pueblo Team earned recertification of Star Status in OSHA's Voluntary Protection Program.; On February 11, 2016, the EDS successfully completed its first destruction campaign, eliminating 265 105 mm projectiles, 196 155 mm projectiles, 88 4.2-inch mortar rounds and 11 Department of Transportation bottles for a total of 560 munitions.; Systemization was completed, and operations began on September 7, 2016.; On September 7, 2016, main plant operations began at PCAPP to destroy the stockpile of chemical weapons stored at the U.S. Army Pueblo Chemical Depot in Colorado. The plant utilized neutralization followed by biotreatment as the technology to destroy 780,078 munitions containing more than 2,600 tons of mustard agent. Additionally, the Army's EDS is on standby to augment the main plant to destroy problematic chemical munitions that cannot be easily processed using its automated equipment.; On November 16, 2016, the Anniston Field Office destroyed the first non-contaminated energetics removed from munitions at PCAPP.; PCAPP operations were paused on November 20, 2016, due to an industrial hazardous waste spill of approximately 450 gallons of hydrolysate. The spill was associated with a seal failure of one of the agitators located on the side of a hydrolysate storage tank. On November 23, an unrelated second issue was discovered; rainwater had leaked through the liner of the secondary containment system surrounding the Brine Concentrator Feed Tanks. These tanks hold the effluent produced in the Immobilized Cell Bioreactors and are essential to the operation of the biotreatment process.; PCAPP operations resumed on January 12, 2017. Under the purview of the Colorado Department of Public Health and Environment, the agitators were removed from one of the hydrolysate storage tanks, and the openings were sealed with blind flanges. Additionally, the liners, from the floor and partway up the walls of the secondary containment system around Brine Concentrator Feed Tanks, were removed.; On April 27, 2017, the Biotreatment Area at the Pueblo plant began processing hydrolysate, which is the product of the neutralization of mustard agent.; From July to September 2017, PCAPP temporarily shipped wastewater off-site for treatment and disposal at the Veolia Environmental Services Hazardous Waste Incinerator in Port Arthur, Texas. The wastewater, known as hydrolysate, is the product of the neutralization of chemical agent at the plant. A total of 52 truckloads safely transported 236,473 gallons to Veolia for disposal.; In September 2017, PCAPP marked its first full year of the pilot testing phase in which the plant destroyed 253 U.S. tons of mustard agent and 42,897 155 mm projectiles.; On September 8, 2017, agent-destruction operations were paused at PCAPP due to higher-than-anticipated amounts of solids being washed out of munitions and clogging agent neutralization systems.; On February 15, 2018, PCAPP ordnance technicians reached a plant milestone when the last of more than 28,000 105 mm projectiles went through Baseline Reconfiguration.; On April 12, 2018, PCAPP ordnance technicians started the baseline reconfiguration process for the 4.2-inch mortar rounds. At the end of this campaign, more than 97,000 of these rounds underwent this process.; On June 12, 2018, agent-destruction operations resumed after required modifications to the Agent Neutralization Reactors were completed.; On November 13, 2018, PCAPP moved one step closer to full operations when the staff initiated Integrated Facility Demonstrations. Within the first 24 hours, the plant experienced its highest throughput, the rate at which munitions are processed, to date. IFDs successfully concluded on May 3, 2019.; On December 5, 2018, the EDS successfully completed its second and final destruction campaign, eliminating 391 munitions unsuitable for processing in the main plant.; On April 1, 2019, PCAPP announced the achievement of a significant milestone - the elimination of a quarter (25%) of the mustard agent stockpiled in chemical weapons in the Pueblo Chemical Depot.; In May 2019, PCAPP successfully completed the third and final round of background sampling for pilot testing.; In July 2019, PCAPP exceeded the destruction of half the 155 mm projectiles in the Pueblo Chemical Depot stockpile.
2020s	In February 2020, PCAPP exceeded the destruction of half of the agent stored at the Pueblo Chemical Depot stockpile.; In June 2020, assembly of the plant's three SDC units was completed.; On June 23, 2020, PCAPP ordnance technicians completed the baseline reconfiguration process for the 4.2-inch mortar rounds.; During the summer of 2020, PCAPP set monthly munitions processing records. In June, 14,126 munitions were processed, 15,440 were processed in July, and 19,033 munitions were destroyed in August.; In September 2020, the first munitions campaign at PCAPP was completed with nearly 300,000 155 mm projectiles stored at the Pueblo Chemical Depot destroyed.; On December 11, 2020, PCAPP began its second destruction campaign with the 105 mm projectiles.; As of April 2021, PCAPP had destroyed 390,000 projectiles, accounting for half (50%) of the original U.S. chemical weapons stockpile stored in Colorado.; On June 30, 2021, PCAPP destroyed 75% of the mustard agent stockpiled in chemical weapons at the Pueblo Chemical Depot.; As of August 13, 2021, more than 2,000 U.S. tons of mustard agent were destroyed at PCAPP.; On September 15, 2021, PCAPP reached the destruction milestone with more than half (50%) of the 105 mm projectiles stored at the Pueblo Chemical Depot destroyed.; As of September 27, 2021, half a million projectiles containing mustard agent were destroyed at PCAPP; On February 19, 2022, the Pueblo SDC complex began agent-destruction operations, destroying 4.2-inch mortar rounds. SDC operations marked the beginning of the third and final chemical weapons destruction campaign at PCAPP.; On July 20, 2022, the second munitions campaign at PCAPP was completed with more than 383,000 105 mm projectiles destroyed.; On July 27, 2022, PCAPP recognized the End of the 105mm Projectile Campaign, marking the end of the second destruction campaign in the main plant. Community members joined government officials and project staff to recognize the chemical weapons destruction milestone.; In September 2022, the closure contract for the Pueblo plant was awarded to Bechtel National Inc.; In September 2022, enhanced equipment added to the main plant enabled previously rejected projectiles to be reintroduced into the main plant's automated robotic destruction system.; On December 1, 2022, PCAPP began destroying 4.2-inch mortar rounds in the main plant using Improved Cavity Access Machines.; On March 31, 2023, PCAPP completed the destruction of more than 20,000 4.2-inch mortar rounds filled with HT mustard agent.; On April 8, 2023, PCAPP began destroying 4.2-inch mortar rounds filled with HD mustard agent in the main plant.; On May 24, 2023, PCAPP began destroying overpacked 4.2-inch mortar rounds in the SDC units.; On May 25, 2023, PCAPP received the final delivery of mortar rounds from the U.S. Army Pueblo Chemical Depot. Delivery of all munitions is complete.; On June 16, 2023, the last munition, a 4.2-inch mortar round, was destroyed in the PCAPP main plant.; On June 22, 2023, the last munition in the chemical weapons stockpile stored at the Pueblo Chemical Depot, an overpacked 155 mm projectile, was destroyed in the plant's SDC complex.; On August 2, 2023, the last non-contaminated energetics removed from chemical munitions at PCAPP were destroyed in the SDC at the Anniston Army Depot in Alabama.; On August 30, 2023, nearly 700,000 community members attended a celebration at the Pueblo Convention Center. The event included remarks from the mayor of Pueblo; Assistant Secretary of Defense (Nuclear, Chemical and Biological Defense Programs) (ASD(NCB)); Undersecretary of State for Arms Control and International Security; Deputy Assistant Secretary of Defense (Threat Reduction and Arms Control); Program Executive Officer, Assembled Chemical Weapons Alternatives; and Principal Vice President and General Manager of Defense and Space, Bechtel National Inc. The governor of Colorado provided the keynote address.; On March 29, 2024, PCAPP moved into its final stage, closure, following approval of its main plant closure plan by the Colorado Department of Public Health and Environment; On September 12, 2024, the U.S. Army Pueblo Chemical Depot was deactivated, becoming the U.S. Army Chemical Materials Activity-West (CMA-West), which provided closure support to PCAPP until 2026.; On November 5, 2024, state regulators approved the closure plan for the SDC complex, setting the course for the reuse of the three units by other DOD organizations.; On March 5, 2025, approval of a permit modification by the Colorado Department of Public Health and Environment allowed workers to start ending the plant’s chemical agent monitoring process.; In July 2025, the plant completed decontamination, disassembly, packaging, and transport of the three Static Detonation Chamber units to U.S. Army organizations in Maryland and Alabama.

== Technology ==
The Department of Defense conducted studies to evaluate potential impacts of the elimination of these weapons using incineration and non-incineration methods. Four technologies were considered:

- incineration
- chemical neutralization followed by supercritical water oxidation
- chemical neutralization followed by supercritical water oxidation and gas-phase chemical reduction
- electrochemical oxidation

Neutralization followed by biotreatment was selected for the destruction of the Colorado stockpile.

The technology comprised the following steps:

- Robotic equipment removed energetics (explosives) from the weapon, including the fuze and the burster. The energetics were disposed of at a permitted facility off-site.
- The inside of the weapon was remotely accessed, and mustard agent was washed out with high-pressure water.
- The mustard agent was mixed with hot water. The resulting mixture was neutralized with a caustic solution. The byproduct was called hydrolysate. The hydrolysate was treated biologically.
- The water was recovered for reuse in the destruction process and the excess activated sludge was secured in containers for disposal at an off-site permitted facility.
- Metal parts were heated to 1,000 °F (538 °C) for 15 minutes for thermal decontamination and were then recycled.

=== Explosive Destruction Technology (EDT) ===
After an assessment of problem munitions showed that their destruction would be difficult using neutralization and biotreatment, ACWA decided to explore the use of Explosive Destruction Technology (EDT), also known as Explosive Demolition Technology or Explosive Detonation Technology, for these projectiles.

EDT uses heat and pressure from an explosion or heat to destroy the munitions; it is not considered incineration and does not require disassembly of the weapons. There are three general types of technologies that can destroy chemical weapons:

- Detonation technology – destroys the majority of the agent and explosive in the munition by detonating donor explosives wrapped around the munition. The resulting off-gases are processed through secondary treatment to ensure agent destruction. Examples of detonation technology include the Transportable Detonation Chamber (TDC), and the DAVINCH (Detonation of Ammunition in a Vacuum-Integrated Chamber).
- Neutralization technology – uses small explosive shaped charges to open the munition and consume the explosive in the burster and fuze. The agent is destroyed by subsequent neutralization. The U.S. Army's Explosive Destruction System (EDS), is an example.
- Thermal destruction – uses the heat of the electrically heated containment vessel to deflagrate the munition and destroy the agent and energetics. The resulting gases are treated in an off-gas treatment system. The Static Detonation Chamber, or SDC, is an example of thermal destruction technology.

In April 2013, Program Executive Officer Conrad F. Whyne announced his selection of the U.S. Army's EDS to augment the PCAPP for the safe destruction of chemical munitions unsuited for processing by the main plant's automated equipment.

The PCAPP EDS started destruction on March 18, 2015, with the elimination of Department of Transportation (DOT) bottles, which contained chemical agent drained from selected munitions over the years, to assess the condition of the stockpile. On April 8, 2015, the first munitions were successfully processed. In June 2015, operators at the PCAPP EDS took things up a notch with the introduction of 4.2-inch mortars into the destruction process. The first three mortars were joined by three 105 mm projectiles. All were safely detonated in the vessel on June 18, 2015. On July 16, 2015, the first 155-mm projectiles from Pueblo's stockpile were safely destroyed in the PCAPP EDS. The PCAPP EDS completed its first campaign in February 2016, destroying 549 munitions that leaked or were sampled in the past and 11 bottles containing mustard agent. The second and final campaign ran from June 25 to December 5, 2018.

=== Static Detonation Chamber (SDC) ===
In spring 2018, PCAPP announced a proposal to procure three Static Detonation Chambers (SDC).

Due to performance issues identified during the first year of pilot testing, and in order to complete the destruction of the stockpile by 2023, this technology was chosen to augment the main plant under a proposal by the ACWA program. To meet the requirements of the National Environmental Policy Act and federal regulations, an Environmental Assessment was conducted. A Finding of No Significant Impact resulted from the assessment.

Preparations at the SDC site began in June 2019. The first SDC components arrived at the depot on August 6, 2019, in a convoy of more than a dozen flatbed trucks. Assembly began on October 31, 2019. Protective, tension fabric coverings were erected around each unit, with construction beginning in September 2019. They were completed in June 2020.

On February 19, 2022, chemical-agent destruction began at the Pueblo SDC complex with the processing of a portion of the 4.2-inch mortar rounds. SDC operations marked the beginning of the third and final chemical weapons destruction campaign at PCAPP.

On June 22, 2023, the last munition in the chemical weapons stockpile stored at the Pueblo Chemical Depot, an overpacked 155-mm projectile, was destroyed in the plant's SDC complex.

State regulators approved the SDC closure plan on November 5, 2024, allowing workers to begin executing the plan to transfer the units to other government agencies.

Approval by state regulators of Reuse Readiness Reports on May 9, May 29, and June 13, 2025, for SDC Units 1, 2, and 3, respectively, allowed for the disassembly and transfer of each unit to other Defense Department organizations.

In July 2025, the plant completed decontamination, disassembly, packaging, and transport of the three Static Detonation Chamber units to U.S. Army organizations in Maryland and Alabama.

== Closure ==
The plant has been in the closure phase since state environmental regulators approved the PCAPP closure plan on March 29, 2024. Closure activities are expected to continue through 2028. Closure is the final phase of the project, coming after completion of chemical weapons destruction operations in 2023. Closure encompasses planning, preparation, and disposal of agent-contaminated and non-contaminated secondary waste; facility and equipment decontamination; and decommissioning and demolition of facilities in accordance with public law and U.S. Army direction. In addition, personal property is disposed of, and real property is returned to the U.S. Army or PuebloPlex, the local redevelopment authority. The last stage is closure of contracts and environmental permits.

== Public Outreach ==
The Pueblo Chemical Stockpile Outreach Office permanently closed to the public in 2023, but staff continues to be available at pueblooutreach@iem.com.

The Pueblo Chemical Stockpile Outreach Office was established in 1997 to serve as the community's primary information resource on chemical weapons destruction in Colorado. The staff responded to inquiries, provided information materials, coordinated guest speakers for various civic groups and organizations, and interfaced with the governor-appointed Colorado Chemical Demilitarization Citizens' Advisory Commission.

The project's environmental permitting information is available for review during regular business hours at:

· Robert Hoag Rawlings Public Library, 100 E. Abriendo Ave., Pueblo, CO 81004

· McHarg Community Center, 405 Second Lane, Avondale, CO 81022

· Boone Community Center, 421 E. First St., Boone, CO 81025

Additional information is also available on the following websites:

- https://cdphe.colorado.gov/hm/HMWMD-public-notices
- army.mil

== See also ==
- Pueblo Chemical Depot
- Pueblo Depot Activity
- Blue Grass Chemical Agent-Destruction Pilot Plant
- Base Realignment and Closure
