= Program Executive Office, Assembled Chemical Weapons Alternatives =

U.S. chemical weapons decommissioning unit

Program Executive Office, Assembled Chemical Weapons Alternatives (PEO ACWA)
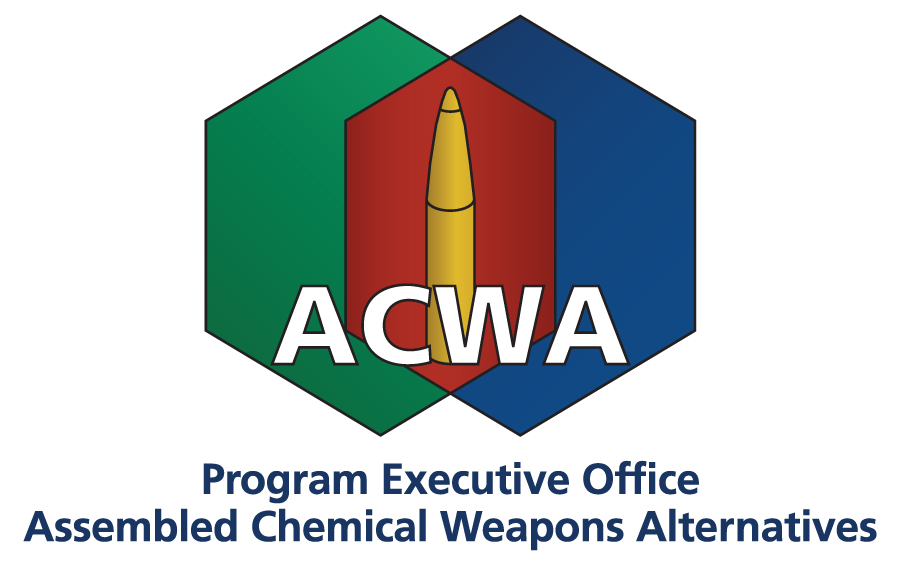
- Mission: Destroy Chemical Weapons Stockpile
- Active: 1996–present
- Country: United States of America
- Headquarters: Aberdeen Proving Ground, Maryland
- Motto: “A Partnership for Safe Chemical Weapons Destruction”
- Program Executive Officer: Tamika D. "Tami" Atkins

The Program Executive Office, Assembled Chemical Weapons Alternatives (PEO ACWA) was responsible for destroying the declared United States chemical weapon stockpile formerly stored at the Blue Grass Army Depot in Kentucky and the U.S. Army Pueblo Chemical Depot in Colorado – now known as the U.S. Army Chemical Materials Activity-West.

In 1996, the United States Congress established the ACWA program to test and demonstrate alternative technologies to baseline incineration for the destruction of chemical weapons. The ACWA program oversaw the design and construction of the two chemical weapons destruction pilot plants – the Pueblo Chemical Agent-Destruction Pilot Plant (PCAPP) in Colorado and the Blue Grass Chemical Agent-Destruction Pilot Plant (BGCAPP) in Kentucky.

As of July 7, 2023, PCAPP and BGCAPP have both concluded the destruction of their respective stockpiles of chemical weapons. PEO ACWA is overseeing both plants through their closure phases, each expected to end in Fiscal Year 2028.

== History of chemical weapons in the United States ==
The production of chemical weapons in the United States began during World War I, after their first large-scale use against Allied troops in Belgium. The United States' chemical weapons stockpile was produced as a deterrent against the creation and use of such weapons against the U.S. Chemical weapons include blister agents that were designed to inflict chemical burns or blister the skin and nerve agents that were designed to impair the nervous system. Production ceased in 1968.

In 1985, with the rise of international dialogue concerning the effects of chemical warfare, the United States started to destroy its stockpile of chemical weapons. In 1997, the United States formally agreed to destroy its stockpile by ratifying the Chemical Weapons Convention. The international treaty bans the use of all chemical weapons and aims to eliminate them throughout the world.

Under the management of the U.S. Army Chemical Materials Agency – now known as the U.S. Army Chemical Materials Activity (CMA) – chemical stockpile destruction was completed at Army installations near Anniston, Alabama; Pine Bluff, Arkansas; Newport, Indiana; Aberdeen, Maryland; Umatilla, Oregon; Tooele, Utah; and on Johnston Atoll, an island in the Pacific. CMA held responsibility for the storage management of the chemical stockpiles at sites near Pueblo, Colorado, and Richmond, Kentucky, whereas PEO ACWA was responsible for stockpile destruction at these sites.

“Assembled” chemical weapons refer to weapons that contain a chemical agent in addition to fuses, explosives, propellant, shipping and firing tubes, and packaging materials. Examples include rockets, projectiles, and bombs.

== History of PEO ACWA ==
=== 1990s ===
In 1996, Congress established the Assembled Chemical Weapons Assessment (ACWA) program to safely test and demonstrate at least two alternative technologies to the baseline incineration process for the destruction of the nation’s stockpile of assembled chemical weapons. ACWA program leaders implemented an open participatory public process called the ACWA Dialogue in 1997 to engage stakeholders in the program’s decision-making process.

Beginning in 1999, Congress authorized ACWA to manage the development and pilot-scale testing of these new technologies. Public Law 106-79 stated that funds would not be allocated for a chemical weapons disposal facility at Blue Grass Army Depot (BGAD) until the Secretary of Defense certified demonstration of six incineration alternatives. ACWA successfully demonstrated three alternative technologies that year.

=== 2000s ===
In 2000, ACWA successfully demonstrated three additional alternative technologies. In total, four of the six demonstrated technologies were found viable for pilot testing. Via Public Law 106-398, the Department of Defense had to consider incineration and any demonstrated ACWA technologies for the disposal of the Colorado stockpile. Two years later, in 2002, ACWA was assigned responsibility for the destruction of the chemical weapons stockpiles in both Colorado and Kentucky. With community input garnered through the 1997 ACWA Dialogue process, the Department of Defense selected destruction technologies for both sites. Neutralization followed by biotreatment was selected for the Colorado stockpile, and neutralization followed by supercritical water oxidation was selected for the Kentucky stockpile.

Once ACWA took on the responsibility for the chemical weapons demilitarization process in Kentucky and Colorado, the organization’s focus shifted from assessing chemical weapon disposal technologies to implementing full-scale pilot testing. In 2003, ACWA changed its name from Assembled Chemical Weapons Assessment to Assembled Chemical Weapons Alternatives to reflect its new program goals.

In 2004, ACWA reached a significant milestone with the groundbreaking for PCAPP, which marked the start of plant construction in Colorado. In 2006, the program reached another milestone, the groundbreaking for BGCAPP, marking the start of construction in Kentucky.

In an April 2006 letter to Congress, Secretary of Defense Donald Rumsfeld affirmed there were no options by which the U.S. could destroy 100 percent of its remaining national chemical stockpile by the Chemical Weapons Convention treaty deadline of April 29, 2012. In 2007, in response to that letter, Congress enacted legislation (Public Law 104-208 and 110-181) mandating the destruction of the remaining U.S. national chemical stockpile by the Chemical Weapons Convention deadline of April 29, 2012, but in no circumstances later than December 31, 2017. The Department of Defense began working with Congress to develop an accelerated schedule to meet the 2017 date as closely as possible. In 2006, the Department of Defense accepted the final design for PCAPP.

Along with congressional changes in 2007, ACWA also experienced a command change. The U.S. Army Element, Assembled Chemical Weapons Alternatives, was formally activated by the Commanding General of the U.S. Army Materiel Command. The new designation as an Army “element,” meaning an Army organization assigned to a non-Army program, signified the official change from the program’s former alignment with the U.S. Army CMA. The change resulted in the ACWA program manager reporting directly to the Department of Defense (Public Law 104-208).

Two years later, in 2009, the Department of Defense provided Congress options for accelerating the ACWA program per Public Laws 110-116 and 110-181. The proposed plan sought out additional resources to: 1) aim toward the U.S. Army CMA completing stockpile under its purview (90 percent of the U.S. stockpile) by 2012 by utilizing performance incentives and risk mitigation actions; and 2) accelerate the ACWA program schedule towards completing the destruction of an additional eight percent of the U.S. stockpile at PCAPP in 2017 and the remaining two percent of the U.S. stockpile at BGCAPP in 2021. This would result in an acceleration in the destruction of three years at PCAPP and two years at BGCAPP. It was decided that on-site treatment and disposal of hydrolysate at PCAPP and BGCAPP would continue, unless unforeseen technical difficulties were to arise.

Also in 2009, Operation Swift Solution Team fulfilled its mission to safely eliminate three deteriorating steel containers that stored a mixture of GB (sarin) nerve agent and its breakdown products at BGAD. The multi-agency effort eliminated health and safety risks associated with the continued storage of the containers as well as other wastes accumulated during the years of their management. In May, the Department of Defense submitted its Semi-Annual Chemical Demilitarization Program Report to Congress in conjunction with the President’s Budget Request for Fiscal Year 2010, laying out the path forward and funding requirements necessary to accelerate the ACWA program in order to complete the destruction of the PCAPP chemical stockpile by 2017 and the BGCAPP stockpile by 2021. In October, the Department of Defense requested that the ACWA Program Manager study how to maintain continuity of demilitarization operations between U.S. Army CMA completion and ACWA start-up, consistent with ongoing efforts to accelerate destruction operations in both Colorado and Kentucky. In December, the Department of Defense Appropriations Act, 2010 (Public Law 111-118) was signed into law.

=== 2010s ===
An environmental assessment was conducted to evaluate the environmental impacts of the proposed acceleration of the construction and operation of an explosive destruction system/explosive destruction technology (EDS/EDT) at PCAPP in 2010; the environmental assessment was later withdrawn. PCAPP entered the systemization phase, where machinery, equipment, and processes are operated and tested with water or simulants to ensure each function operates together as an integrated system. With final design approval for BGCAPP accepted, the construction and systemization phases began concurrently at the Kentucky plant. Construction teams turned over the first subsystems to the start-up groups for systemization testing and commissioned them to begin to prepare the facilities for chemical weapons destruction operations.

After a six-month program review, in 2011, the Under Secretary of Defense for Acquisition, Technology and Logistics certified the ACWA program to Congress under the Nunn-McCurdy Amendment. The Under Secretary subsequently directed ACWA to proceed with the program without any significant changes to the destruction technology.

Later that same year, BCAPP partners, along with the Blue Grass Chemical Activity, conducted an X-ray assessment of the mustard agent stockpile. This assessment showed that the removal of the mustard agent from the projectiles would be difficult using the current BGCAPP design. The Blue Grass team needed to evaluate the feasibility of utilizing EDT to destroy this specific segment of the stockpile.

In 2012, to increase the program’s visibility and obtain necessary support and resources, ACWA was redesignated Program Executive Office, Assembled Chemical Weapons Alternatives (PEO ACWA) and reassigned to the U.S. Army Acquisition Support Center. As mandated by law, the program’s direct reporting connection continued to be the Department of Defense. To meet the requirements of the National Environmental Policy Act (NEPA) and Title 32 Code of Federal Regulations Part 651, PEO ACWA, in conjunction with the U.S. Army Pueblo Chemical Depot (PCD), completed an environmental assessment regarding the possible use of EDT in Pueblo. Following a public comment period and review of those comments, it was concluded that no significant environmental impacts would occur due to the proposed installation and operation of EDT. PCAPP leadership officially declared construction complete on December 12, 2012, and moved solely into the systemization phase of the project.

In 2013, Program Executive Officer Conrad F. Whyne announced his selection of the U.S. Army’s EDS to augment PCAPP at PCD in Colorado. The decision followed a lengthy review of several EDTs designed for the safe destruction of chemical munitions unsuited for processing by the main plant’s automated equipment. In June, BGAD and PEO ACWA completed an environmental assessment to meet the requirements of the NEPA, and Title 32 Code of Federal Regulations Part 651, to address any potential impacts of the installation and operation of EDT at the depot. An initial draft Finding of No Significant Impact was prepared and provided for a 60-day period for public comments. After those 60-days, it was concluded that no additional analysis was necessary for the proposed action under NEPA. The Bechtel Parsons Blue Grass team received approval from PEO ACWA to begin initial work on an EDT system at BGCAPP. Following an extensive competitive procurement process, PEO ACWA selected the Static Detonation Chamber (SDC).

In 2014, construction began on the PCAPP EDS site, located at PCD. The first of two EDS units arrived on site, aligning with the completion of the specially designed environmental enclosures that housed the EDS units for added protection. Also, in 2014, the Kentucky Department for Environmental Protection approved the initiation of construction activities of the EDT facility at BGCAPP.

Provisional Operations, a two-month period in which operations and maintenance staff trained with simulated munitions and agent, began at PCAPP. This extensive training was conducted on a large-scale to ensure employees were prepared for plant operations. Systemization reached 67 percent completion at PCAPP and 25 percent completion at BGCAPP by early 2014.

To ensure the project maintained technical expertise, in June 2014, the PEO ACWA Anniston Field Office was established to retain the staff at the former Anniston Chemical Agent Disposal Facility. An SDC at Anniston was maintained for training purposes and destruction of non-contaminated energetics resulting from chemical weapons destruction in both Colorado and Kentucky.

On March 18, 2015, chemical stockpile destruction in Colorado was initiated on location at PCD near PCAPP using the EDS. The event marked the first step towards eliminating the final 10 percent of the U.S. chemical weapons stockpile. In June 2015, operations at the PCAPP EDS expanded with the introduction of 4.2-inch mortars into the destruction process. The first three mortars were joined by three 105mm projectiles. All were safely detonated in the EDS vessel on June 18, 2015. On July 26, 2015, the first 155mm projectiles from Pueblo’s stockpile were safely destroyed in the PCAPP EDS.

At BGCAPP, in June 2015, the SDC completed Factory Acceptance Testing at the Dynasafe workshop in Kristinehanm, Sweden. The SDC arrived at BGCAPP in August to be assembled, tested and installed. On October 28, 2015, BGCAPP declared construction of the main facility substantially completed and the project fully transitioned into the systemization phase.

On February 11, 2016, the PCAPP EDS successfully completed its first campaign at PCD in Colorado, destroying 560 problematic munitions. At that time, the EDS went on stand-by with plans to resume further EDS operations at a later date. PCAPP technicians began testing the Biotreatment Area using a surrogate solution, thiodiglycol. Preliminary results showed the system worked effectively. In September 2016, PCAPP entered into the pilot testing phase, where destruction operations were tested. The main plant began chemical weapons destruction operations on September 7, 2016. In October 2016, the plant began the neutralization process.

At BGCAPP, site systemization activities began, where workers tested various equipment. The SDC was placed, and walls were built around it.

On November 16, 2016, the Anniston Field Office destroyed the first non-contaminated energetics removed from munitions at PCAPP.

At PEO ACWA headquarters in Maryland, Tamika Atkins was named chief of staff and Joseph Novad was named deputy program executive officer.

On April 28, 2017, Conrad Whyne retired as program executive officer, and on June 25, 2017, Suzanne S. Milchling assumed duty as the newly assigned program executive officer.

On February 15, 2018, PCAPP ordnance technicians reached a plant milestone when the last of more than 28,000 105mm projectiles went through baseline reconfiguration. By July 2016, the BGCAPP systemization team had turned over more than half of the 59 plant systems to operations.

On September 10, 2018, Michael S. Abaie assumed duties as the program executive officer.

On November 13, 2018, PCAPP Integrated Facility Demonstrations (IFDs) began. On December 5, 2018, the PCAPP EDS finished its second and final campaign destroying 391 munitions.

As of April 1, 2019, PCAPP destroyed a quarter (25%) of the mustard agent stockpile at PCD. On May 3, 2019, PCAPP IFDs successfully concluded and PCAPP transitioned from the pilot testing phase to full operations. By August 1, 2019, more than half of the 155mm munitions at PCD were destroyed. On August 6, the components for the first of three SDC units arrived at the depot in Colorado and assembly began on October 31, 2019.

Also in April 2019, officials from the Organisation for the Prohibition of Chemical Weapons, or OPCW, toured BGCAPP as part of a final oversight technical review prior to operations. On May 29, 2019, BGCAPP held the Start of Agent Operations event at the Armed Forces Reserve Center in Richmond, Kentucky, to recognize the start of chemical weapons stockpile destruction in Kentucky. On June 7, 2019, BGCAPP successfully destroyed the first mustard agent-filled munition in the SDC, marking the beginning of SDC operations in Kentucky.

=== 2020s ===
On January 17, 2020, the BGCAPP main plant entered the operations phase with the destruction of the first 8-inch projectile containing GB nerve agent. In March 2020, the first concrete foundation was placed for a support building for the SDC 2000 facility, which augmented the main plant processing.

On February 26, 2020, PCAPP exceeded the destruction of half of the mustard agent in the munitions stored at PCD. On May 11, 2020, BGCAPP destroyed all 8-inch projectiles containing GB nerve agent, marking the completion of the first munitions campaign for the project. On June 20, 2020, PEO ACWA reached a mission milestone with the destruction of half the remaining stockpile, a combined 1,568 U.S. tons in Colorado and Kentucky. On June 23, 2020, PCAPP finished baseline reconfiguration of the 4.2-inch mortar rounds containing mustard agent. On September 5, 2020, the first munitions campaign at PCAPP was completed with nearly 300,000 155mm projectiles stored at the Pueblo Chemical Depot destroyed.

In August 2020, the decision was made not to use the supercritical water oxidation system at BGCAPP to process hydrolysate, the product of the neutralization process.

On December 11, 2020, PCAPP began its second destruction campaign with the 105mm projectiles.

On January 10, 2021, BGCAPP began its second main plant destruction campaign with the 155mm projectiles containing VX nerve agent.

On June 30, 2021, PCAPP destroyed 75% of the mustard agent stockpiled in chemical weapons at PCD.

On July 9, 2021, BGCAPP destroyed M55 rockets containing VX nerve agent for the first time, marking the start of the fourth of five destruction campaigns.

As of August 13, 2021, more than 2,000 U.S. tons of mustard agent was destroyed at PCAPP.

On September 4, 2021, the third destruction campaign was completed at BGCAPP as the final mustard 155mm projectiles were destroyed.

On September 15, 2021, PCAPP reached the destruction milestone with more than half (50%) of the 105mm projectiles stored at PCD destroyed.

As of September 27, 2021, half a million projectiles containing mustard agent were destroyed at PCAPP.

On February 19, 2022, the Pueblo SDC complex began agent-destruction operations, destroying 4.2-inch mortar rounds. This marked the beginning of the third and final chemical weapons destruction campaign at PCAPP.

On March 29, 2022, the Anniston Field Office destroyed the first non-contaminated motors removed from M55 rockets at BGCAPP.

On April 19, 2022, BGCAPP destroyed the last M55 rocket containing VX nerve agent, thus completing the fourth and penultimate destruction campaign.

On July 6, 2022, the fifth and final destruction campaign at BGCAPP began when the first M55 rocket containing GB nerve agent was destroyed in the main plant.

On July 20, 2022, the second munitions campaign at PCAPP was completed with more than 383,000 105mm projectiles destroyed.

As of September 9, 2022, 50% of the original stockpile of chemical agent at BGCAPP was destroyed.

On December 1, 2022, Pueblo crews began using improved technology to destroy 4.2-inch mortar rounds in the main plant.

On January 27, 2023, BGCAPP operators began destroying containerized rocket warheads, previously drained of GB nerve agent in the main plant, using the SDC 2000.

As of February 24, 2023, 75% of the original stockpile of chemical agent at BGCAPP was destroyed.

On March 31, 2023, PCAPP completed destruction of more than 20,000 4.2-inch mortar rounds filled with HD mustard agent.

On April 8, 2023, PCAPP began destroying 4.2-inch mortar rounds filled with HD mustard agent in the main plant.

On April 12, 2023, the last VX nerve agent rocket motor from BGCAPP was destroyed in the Static Detonation Chamber at the Anniston Army Depot in Alabama.

On May 24, 2023, PCAPP began destroying overpacked 4.2-inch mortar rounds in the Static Detonation Chamber units.

On May 25, 2023, PCAPP received the final delivery of mortar rounds from the U.S. Army Pueblo Chemical Depot.

On May 25, 2023, the final delivery of munitions from PCD to the PCAPP main plant was made. On June 16, 2023, the last munition, a 4.2-inch mortar round, was destroyed in this facility.

On June 20, 2023, the final delivery of munitions from PCS was made to the Pueblo SDC complex. On June 22, 2023, the last munition, an overpacked 155mm projectile, was destroyed in this facility, marking the completion of destruction of the chemical weapons stockpile in Colorado.

On July 3, 2023, the final delivery of munitions from BGAD to the BGCAPP main plant was made. On July 7, 2023, the last munition, a GB M55 rocket, was destroyed in this facility, marking the completion of destruction of the chemical weapons stockpile in Kentucky. This also marked the completion of the destruction of the declared U.S. stockpile of chemical weapons.

On August 2, 2023, the last non-contaminated energetics removed from munitions at PCAPP were destroyed in the SDC at the Anniston Army Depot in Alabama.

On April 3, 2025, the last non-contaminated rocket motor from BGCAPP was destroyed in the SDC at the Anniston Army Depot in Alabama.

On May 21, 2025, demolition of the SDC at the Anniston Army Depot was completed.

On September 11, 2025, BGCAPP destroyed the last agent-contaminated secondary waste, a containerized rocket warhead containing residual amounts of VX nerve agent, in the SDC 1200.

== Emblem ==
Emblem of PEO ACWA

The benzene ring is symbolic of the U.S. Army Chemical Corps, and the two entwined benzene rings allude to the two (former) chemical weapons storage sites at Pueblo Chemical Depot and Blue Grass Army Depot. The green ring represents that of Blue Grass, while the blue ring represents that of Pueblo.

A third, red benzene ring, created by the entwinement, and emblazoned with an artillery projectile, signifies the successful assessment phase and recognizes PEO ACWA’s unique charge to develop destruction alternatives specifically focused on assembled chemical weapons. The gold projectile, set against a red background, is reminiscent of the Field Artillery branch, the original chemical weapons delivery arm.

The color red, together with the white “ACWA” letters, also reflect the red and white Crossland family botonee cross on the Maryland state flag, and are meant to honor the Maryland headquarters of PEO ACWA.

== Chemical weapons destruction in Colorado ==
PEO ACWA is responsible for the management of PCAPP at the U.S. Army Chemical Materials Activity-West, formerly known as the U.S. Army Pueblo Chemical Depot, located near Pueblo, Colorado.

The Pueblo Chemical Depot was originally constructed as the Pueblo Ordnance Depot in 1942 and has been responsible for the safe and secure storage of 2,613 U.S. tons of mustard agent in projectiles and mortars. The weapons were stored at the 23,000-acre (93 km^{2}) depot since the 1950s.

As of June 22, 2023, destruction of the chemical weapons stockpile in Colorado was completed. The destruction technology used was neutralization followed by biotreatment. The follow-on process, biological treatment, consisted of breaking down the product of neutralization, called hydrolysate, by microbial digestion. Non-contaminated energetics removed from the munitions as part of the destruction process were destroyed in the Anniston, Alabama, SDC. Additionally, three SDCs augmented PCAPP's neutralization/biotreatment technology to destroy 4.2-inch mortar rounds and any projectiles that were found unsuitable for processing through the main plant. In July 2025, the plant completed decontamination, disassembly, packaging, and transport of the three SDC units to U.S. Army organizations in Maryland and Alabama.

PCAPP is now in the closure phase, expected to be complete in 2028.

== Chemical weapons destruction in Kentucky ==
PEO ACWA is responsible for the management of BGCAPP at BGAD, located in eastern central Kentucky. The 14,600-acre (59 km^{2}) installation stores and maintains conventional munitions and provides chemical defense equipment and special operations support to the Department of Defense. The Blue Grass Chemical Activity, a tenant of the depot, was responsible for the safeguarding of a portion of the U.S. chemical weapons stockpile, 523 tons of nerve agents GB and VX in rockets and projectiles, and mustard agent in projectiles.

As of July 7, 2023, destruction of the chemical weapons stockpile in Kentucky was completed, also marking the completion of destruction of the declared U.S. chemical weapons stockpile. BGCAPP also used neutralization to destroy chemical agent while SDC technology was used to destroy mustard agent-filled projectiles; containerized, drained, and undrained rocket warheads; M55 rocket overpacks; and rockets not suitable to be processed in the main plant. Non-contaminated rocket motors removed as part of the destruction process were destroyed in the Anniston, Alabama, SDC. Now destruction is complete, BGCAPP will go through a three-to-four-year closure stage. BGCAPP is now in the closure phase, expected to be complete in Fiscal Year 2028. Part of this phase included the destruction of containerized, drained rocket warheads, considered agent-contaminated secondary waste, in the plant’s SDC units, which was completed in September 2025.

== PEO ACWA schedule ==
Destruction of the remaining U.S. chemical weapons stockpile was completed by the Chemical Weapons Convention treaty commitment of September 30, 2023. U.S. Public Law mandated stockpile destruction by December 31, 2023.

== Closure ==
Destruction of the declared U.S. chemical weapons stockpile stored in Colorado and Kentucky was completed in 2023. Closure is underway at both plants. The facilities are being closed in a safe and environmentally compliant manner and in accordance with all applicable laws, regulations, and requirements.

Chemical destruction facility closure involves five major factors: decontamination, decommissioning, dispositioning, demolition, and administrative closeout. The closure phase is expected to be complete in Fiscal Year 2028. At the completion of the closure phase, the PEO ACWA program will conclude, ending formal ties with the program's stakeholders.

== Outreach offices ==
With the July 2023 completion of the destruction of the declared U.S. chemical weapons stockpile stored in Colorado and Kentucky and the plants’ subsequent focus on closure, the outreach offices’ primary mission of keeping stakeholders informed about the destruction of the chemical weapons has come to an end.

The Pueblo Chemical Stockpile Outreach Office in Colorado closed at the end of 2023, and the Blue Grass Chemical Stockpile Outreach Office in Kentucky closed at the end of April 2024.
