= Blue Grass Chemical Agent-Destruction Pilot Plant =

Planned weapons destruction plant in Kentucky, U.S.

Coordinates: 37.7171°N 84.2077°W

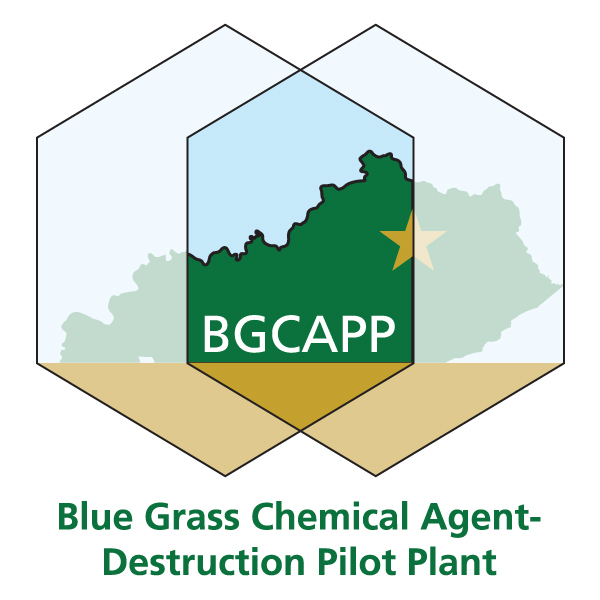
BGCAPP Logo

The Blue Grass Chemical Agent-Destruction Pilot Plant (BGCAPP) is a facility built to destroy the chemical weapons stockpile at the Blue Grass Army Depot (BGAD), near Richmond, Kentucky.

The last munition, an M55 rocket containing GB nerve agent, was destroyed July 7, 2023. It marked the last chemical weapon in the U.S. stockpile.

Since 1944, the Army stored 523 short tons (474 t) of nerve agents sarin (GB) and VX and mustard agent in 155mm projectiles, 8-inch projectiles and M55 rockets at BGAD. That was about 2% of the nation's original chemical weapons stockpile.

BGCAPP used neutralization to destroy the majority of the stockpile and Static Detonation Chamber (SDC) units to augment the main plant. Non-contaminated rocket motors removed as part of the destruction process were destroyed in the Anniston, Alabama, SDC.

Destruction of this stockpile was a requirement of the Chemical Weapons Convention, an international treaty to which the United States is a party. The Organisation for the Prohibition of Chemical Weapons is the implementing body of the Chemical Weapons Convention and monitored the progress of the nation's chemical weapons destruction programs. The Program Executive Office, Assembled Chemical Weapons Alternatives (PEO ACWA) oversaw the destruction of the Blue Grass chemical weapons stockpile and agent-contaminated secondary waste. It continues to oversee closure activities scheduled to be complete in Fiscal Year 2028.

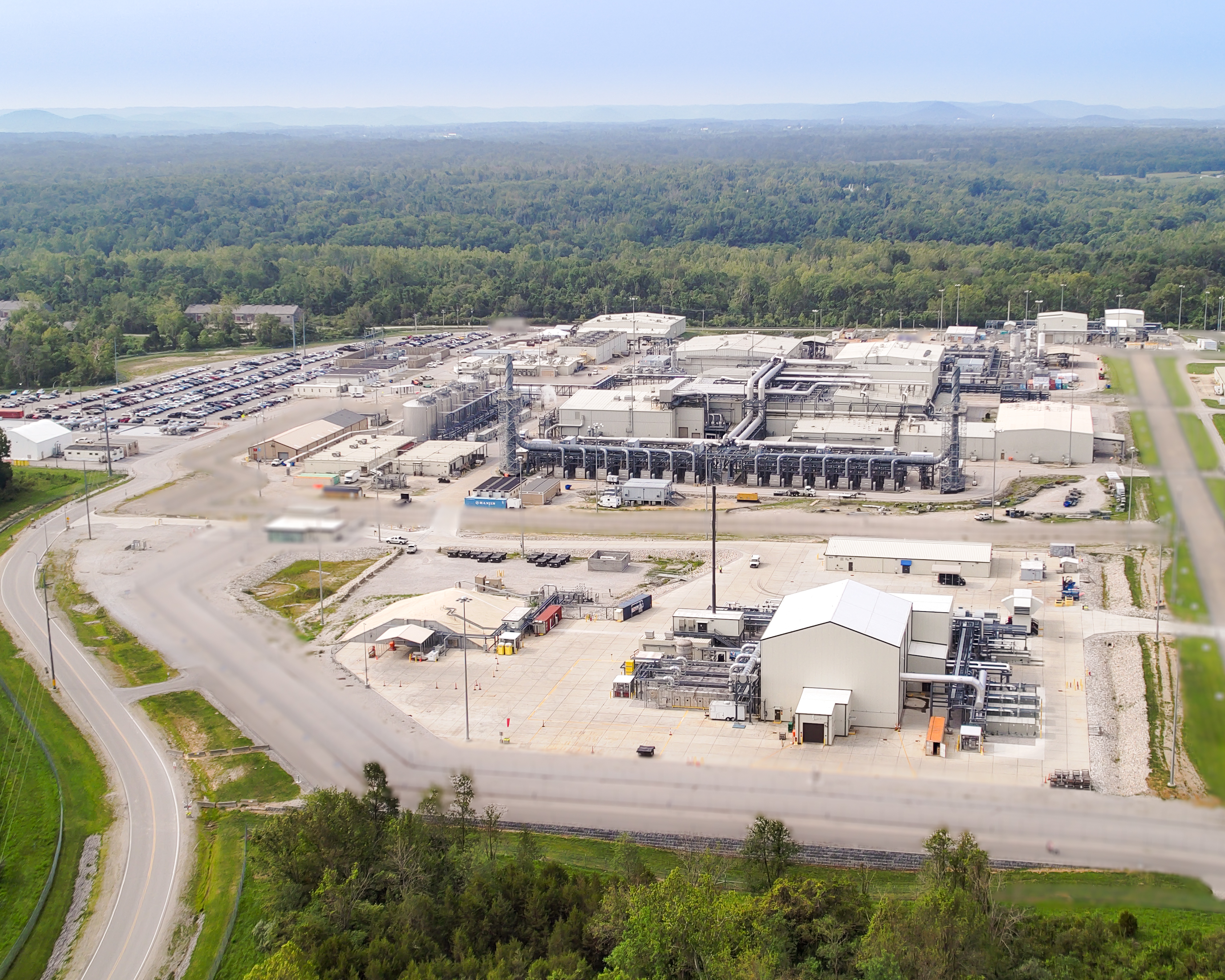
An aerial overhead view of the BGCAPP facility

== Planning and organization ==
A systems contract was awarded in June 2003 to a joint venture team composed of Bechtel National, Inc., and Parsons Corporation. The Bechtel Parsons Blue Grass team was contracted to design, construct, systemize, operate, and close BGCAPP.

In March 2005, the design-build-operate-close schedule was extended to make the program more affordable on an annual basis. Site preparation work and the construction of support buildings continued, and final designs for the remaining BGCAPP facilities were completed in 2010. In June 2019, the SDC began destroying mustard agent-filled projectiles. In January 2020, the BGCAPP main plant facility began destroying nerve agent-filled projectiles. The last munition was destroyed on July 7, 2023.

The destruction schedule exceeded the terms of the Chemical Weapons Convention deadline of April 29, 2012. The U.S. subsequently committed to the Organisation for the Prohibition of Chemical Weapons to complete chemical weapons destruction by September 30, 2023, which it accomplished.

Closure activities (decontamination, demolition, restoration of the site, and closure of permits) are slated to be completed in Fiscal Year 2028.

Legislation enacted by the U.S. Congress in 2007 (Public Laws 110-116 and 110-181) mandated the destruction of the remaining U.S. national chemical stockpile in accordance with the April 2012 date, but in no circumstances later than December 31, 2017. This deadline was subsequently extended to December 31, 2023, by the National Defense Authorization Act for Fiscal Year 2016 (Public Law 114-92).

== History of chemical demilitarization in Kentucky ==
Decade	Milestones
1940s	BGAD began the storage of chemical weapons containing mustard agent.
1960s	BGAD began the storage of chemical weapons containing nerve agent.
1980s	Public Law 99-145 designated the U.S. Army responsible for the destruction of the U.S. chemical weapons stockpile.
1990s	Congress established the ACWA program to identify and demonstrate alternatives to incineration.; Congress ratified the Chemical Weapons Convention treaty, which directs all member nations to destroy their chemical weapons and production facilities.
2000s	Public Law 107-248 assigned ACWA responsibility for the destruction of chemical weapons stored in Kentucky if an alternative technology was chosen.; Department of Defense selected neutralization followed by supercritical water oxidation (SCWO) as the destruction method for the Kentucky stockpile.; Bechtel Parsons Blue Grass awarded the contract to design, build, and operate BGCAPP.; The Secretary of Defense affirmed to Congress that there were no options by which the U.S. could destroy 100 percent of its chemical stockpile by the extended Chemical Weapons Convention treaty deadline of April 29, 2012.; The BGCAPP groundbreaking was held.; Public Laws 110-116 and 110-181 were enacted, mandating the destruction of the chemical stockpile by April 2012 or, in no case, later than December 31, 2017.; Site preparation and basic facility infrastructure (perimeter fencing, lighting, and underground utilities) were complete.; Vertical construction of the personnel support building, the maintenance building, and the badging facility was complete.; Construction activities progressed, focusing on the facility's Munitions Demilitarization Building, Utility Power Centers, Fire Water Pump House, Utility Building, and SCWO Building.
2010s	BGCAPP surpassed 4 million job hours worked without a lost-time injury.; Construction activities progressed, focusing on the facility's Munitions Demilitarization Building, Utility Power Centers, Fire Water Pump House, Utility Building, SCWO Processing Building, and Control and Support Building.; The Department of Defense accepted the final BGCAPP design.; The systemization phase began at BGCAPP. Construction teams turned over the first subsystems to the start-up groups for systemization testing and commissioning to begin preparing the facilities for chemical weapons destruction operations. The construction teams turned over the first building, the Fire Water Pump House, and the first system, the 138 kV Power Center, to the systemization team.; BGCAPP partnered with the Blue Grass Chemical Activity to conduct an X-ray assessment of the mustard agent stockpile. The assessment showed that the removal of mustard agent from projectiles would be difficult using the current BGCAPP design. The Blue Grass team evaluated the feasibility of utilizing Explosive Destruction Technology (EDT) to destroy this segment of the stockpile.; BGCAPP was designated as a Voluntary Protection Program Star Status site by the U.S. Department of Labor's Occupational Safety and Health Administration.; In June 2013, BGAD and PEO ACWA completed an environmental assessment to meet the requirements of the National Environmental Policy Act (NEPA) and Title 32 Code of Federal Regulations Part 651, to address any potential impacts of the installation and operation of EDT at the depot. The environmental assessment concluded that the installation and operation of an EDT will have no significant environmental impacts. A draft finding of No Significant Impact was prepared and provided for public comment for a 60-day period. It was concluded that no additional analysis was necessary for the proposed action under NEPA.; Bechtel Parsons Blue Grass received approval from PEO ACWA to begin initial work on an EDT system at the Blue Grass plant. Following a competitive procurement process, Bechtel Parsons selected the SDC.; BGCAPP received approval from the Kentucky Department for Environmental Protection in 2014 to begin initial construction activities of an EDT facility.; In 2014, systemization reached 25 percent completion at BGCAPP.; In 2015, the Bechtel Parsons Blue Grass Team earned recertification of Star Status in the Occupational Safety and Health Administration's Voluntary Protection Program.; In June 2015, the SDC completed Factory Acceptance Testing at the Dynasafe workshop in Kristinehamn, Sweden. The SDC arrived at BGCAPP in August to be assembled, tested, and installed.; The SDC was assembled and installed at BGCAPP in early 2016.; In July 2017, the BGCAPP team began systemization and testing activities on the Energetics Batch Hydrolyzers and Metal Parts Treaters.; In August 2017, 25 percent (i.e., 15 systems) of the systems and facilities at BGCAPP were turned over from the systemization team to the operations team.; In September 2017, the BGCAPP team began systemization or testing activities on the Rocket Handling System.; In November 2017, the team began pre-systemization activities in the EDT facility.; In late 2017, ACWA Test Equipment (ATE) was introduced in the plant to test and calibrate equipment.; In December 2017, Kentucky Department for Environmental Protection opened a 45-day public comment period on the GB Sampling and Research, Development & Demonstration permit modifications.; In January 2018, the BGCAPP team successfully completed the Systemization Demonstration Procedure for the Energetics Neutralization System.; In February 2018, the BGCAPP team tested pre-filter banks for proper filtration and air flow, and the team introduced nitrogen into the plant for the first time.; In March 2018, the BGCAPP systemization team turned over 21 of 59 Blue Grass plant systems to operations.; By July 2018, the BGCAPP systemization team turned over more than half of the 59 systems to operations.; In October 2018, plant workers were fitted for and received M40 masks as part of their standard personal protective equipment.; In November 2018, the Blue Grass plant received 44 M60 training rockets from BGAD.; On May 29, 2019, an event was held to mark the start of chemical weapons destruction operations.; In June 2019, the SDC entered the operations phase with the successful destruction of the first mustard agent-filled munition on June 7, 2019.; In July 2019, the Blue Grass Army Depot commander signed a document verifying that no significant impact to the environment is anticipated from the proposed additional SDC for the Blue Grass plant.
2020s	On January 17, 2020, the BGCAPP main plant entered the operational phase with the destruction of the first 8-inch projectile containing GB nerve agent.; In March 2020, the first concrete foundation was placed for a support building for the new, larger SDC 2000 facility, which was added to augment the main plant processing.; In May 2020, the first destruction campaign at BGCAPP was completed when all 8-inch projectiles containing GB nerve agent were destroyed using neutralization.; In August 2020, the decision was made not to use the supercritical water oxidation system to process hydrolysate, the product of the neutralization process.; On January 10, 2021, BGCAPP destroyed 155mm projectiles containing VX nerve agent for the first time.; In March 2021, program officials announced that hydrolysate, the product of nerve-agent neutralization at BGCAPP, would be destroyed at Veolia North America near Port Arthur, Texas.; On May 28, 2021, the second destruction campaign was completed as the final VX 155mm projectiles were destroyed.; On July 9, 2021, BGCAPP destroyed M55 rockets containing VX nerve agent for the first time, marking the start of the fourth of five destruction campaigns.; On September 4, 2021, the third destruction campaign was completed as the final mustard 155mm projectiles in Kentucky were destroyed.; On October 7, 2021, BGCAPP shipped the first tankers of hydrolysate for destruction at Veolia North America near Port Arthur, Texas.; On November 1, 2021, BGCAPP shipped the first boxes of non-contaminated rocket motors to Anniston Army Depot for destruction in an SDC.; On March 29, 2022, the Anniston Field Office destroyed the first non-contaminated motors removed from M55 rockets at BGCAPP.; On April 19, 2022, BGCAPP destroyed the last M55 rocket containing VX nerve agent, thus completing the fourth and penultimate destruction campaign.; On July 6, 2022, the fifth and final destruction campaign began when the first M55 rocket containing GB nerve agent was destroyed.; As of September 9, 2022, 50% of the original stockpile of chemical agents at BGCAPP has been destroyed.; On January 27, 2023, the SDC 2000 entered the operations phase with the successful destruction of the first containerized rocket warhead previously drained of GB nerve agent in the main plant.; On February 17, 2023, BGCAPP reached 50% destruction of the M55 rockets containing GB nerve agent in the plant's fifth and final destruction campaign.; As of February 24, 2023, 75% of BGCAPP's original chemical agent stockpile had been destroyed.; On April 12, 2023, the last VX nerve agent rocket motor from BGCAPP was destroyed in the SDC at the Anniston Army Depot in Alabama.; On May 2, 2023, BGCAPP reached 75% destruction complete of the M55 rockets containing GB nerve agent.; On July 7, 2023, BGCAPP destroyed the last M55 rocket containing GB nerve agent, completing the destruction of munitions stored at BGAD and the end of the declared U.S. stockpile.; On July 14, 2023, the Kentucky Department for Environmental Protection granted BGCAPP a Temporary Authorization Request to begin closure activities in the main plant.; On September 27, 2023, the Kentucky Department for Environmental Protection approved a Resource Conservation and Recovery Act permit modification to conduct the closure phase at BGCAPP.; On October 25, 2023, the SDC 1200 destroyed the first containerized rocket warhead previously drained of VX nerve agent in the main plant as part of secondary-waste operations during closure.; On August 5, 2024, BGCAPP reached 50% destruction of containerized rocket warheads containing residual amounts of GB nerve agent as part of secondary-waste destruction in the SDC 2000 during the plant's closure phase.; On September 20, 2024, BGCAPP reached 50% destruction of containerized rocket warheads containing residual amounts of VX nerve agent as part of secondary-waste destruction in the SDC 1200 during the plant's closure phase.; On March 11, 2025, BGCAPP reached 75% destruction of containerized rocket warheads containing residual amounts of GB nerve agent as part of secondary-waste destruction in the SDC 2000 during the plant's closure phase.; On April 3, 2025, the last non-contaminated rocket motor from BGCAPP was destroyed in the SDC at the Anniston Army Depot in Alabama. The destruction marked the end of operations for the Anniston SDC unit.; On May 31, 2025, BGCAPP reached 75% destruction of containerized rocket warheads containing residual amounts of VX nerve agent as part of secondary-waste destruction in the SDC 1200 during the plant's closure phase.; On August 11, 2025, BGCAPP destroyed the last containerized rocket warhead containing residual amounts of GB nerve agent in the SDC 2000.; On September 11, 2025, BGCAPP destroyed the last containerized rocket warhead containing residual amounts of VX nerve agent in the SDC 1200.; On October 24, 2025, inspectors from the Organisation for the Prohibition of Chemical Weapons signed the final closeout report certifying all chemical agent components had been processed and were gone from BGCAPP, marking the end of inspection by the international group.

== Technology ==
The Department of Defense conducted studies to evaluate potential impacts of the elimination of these weapons using incineration and non-incineration methods for the plant. Four technologies were considered:

- Incineration
- Chemical neutralization followed by supercritical water oxidation (SCWO)
- Chemical neutralization followed by supercritical water oxidation and gas phase chemical reduction
- Electrochemical oxidation

=== Neutralization ===
The Department of Defense initially selected neutralization followed by supercritical water oxidation for use at the depot. In 2020, the decision was made not to use the supercritical water oxidation system and instead to ship the nerve agent hydrolysate to a permitted treatment, storage, and disposal facility.

The neutralization method consisted of the following steps:

- Munitions were disassembled by modified reverse assembly.
- The chemical agent was drained from the munitions. The liquid agent was chemically mixed with caustic and water to destroy the chemical agent using hydrolysis. The resulting chemical compound is known as hydrolysate.
- Hydrolysate was held and tested to ensure agent destruction.
- The agent hydrolysate was shipped to Veolia North America near Port Arthur, Texas, for further processing. Destruction of this hydrolysate was completed on August 28, 2023. Hydrolysate from decontamination activities continued to be shipped during the plant's closure phase.
- Metal parts were thermally decontaminated by heating them to more than 1,000 °F (538 °C) for a minimum of 15 minutes. They were then safely recycled.
- Gas effluents were filtered through a series of HEPA and carbon filters before being released to the atmosphere.

=== Explosive Destruction Technology (EDT) ===
After an X-ray assessment of the mustard munitions stockpile showed that the agent had significantly solidified in the rounds, making removal of mustard agent from projectiles difficult using neutralization, ACWA decided to explore the use of EDT for these projectiles.

EDT uses heat/pressure from an explosion or just heat to destroy munitions; it is not considered incineration and does not require disassembly of weapons. Three general types of technologies can destroy chemical weapons:

- Detonation Technology – destroys the majority of the agent and explosive in the munition by detonating donor explosives wrapped around the munition. The resulting off-gases are processed through secondary treatment to ensure agent destruction. Examples of detonation technology include the Transportable Detonation Chamber (TDC) and the DAVINCH (Detonation of Ammunition in a Vacuum-Integrated Chamber).
- Neutralization Technology – uses small explosive shaped charges to open the munition and consume the explosive in the burster and fuze. The agent is destroyed by subsequent neutralization. The U.S. Army's Explosive Destruction System, or EDS, is an example.
- Thermal Destruction – uses the heat of the electrically heated containment vessel to deflagrate the munition and destroy the agent and energetics. The resulting gases are treated in an off-gas treatment system. The SDC is an example of thermal destruction technology.

Bechtel Parsons Blue Grass received approval from PEO ACWA to begin initial work on an EDT system at the Blue Grass plant. Following a competitive procurement process, Bechtel Parsons selected the SDC.

In June 2015, the SDC completed Factory Acceptance Testing at the Dynasafe workshop in Kristinehamn, Sweden. The SDC was assembled and installed at BGCAPP in 2016.

In May 2018, EDT technicians brought the air filtration system online for the first time.

In July 2018, construction was substantially completed, and testing began on EDT plant equipment in remote operations mode.

In February 2019, a total of 24 B586 conventional munitions were processed in the SDC as part of systemization activities.

On June 7, 2019, the SDC, now called the SDC 1200, entered the operations phase with the successful destruction of the first mustard agent-filled munition.

On September 4, 2021, the final mustard 155mm projectiles in Kentucky were destroyed in the SDC 1200.

On October 25, 2023, after being retrofitted with a new off-gas treatment system and completing systemization, the SDC 1200 began destroying drained, containerized rocket warheads (CRW) containing residual amounts of VX nerve agent. The CRWs were considered agent-contaminated secondary waste and were destroyed as part of the plant's closure phase. The last VX nerve agent CRW was destroyed September 11, 2025.

=== Static Detonation Chamber (SDC) ===
In September 2019, BGCAPP received state approval to begin work on a second, larger SDC, the SDC 2000. Workers broke ground on January 22, 2020. The site included the main structure housing the detonation chamber, a storage magazine, and support buildings.

It began operations on January 27, 2023, destroying the first containerized rocket warhead containing residual amounts of GB nerve agent.

BGCAPP used the new, larger SDC 2000 to destroy drained and undrained rocket warheads, M55 rocket overpacks, and rockets not suitable for processing in the main plant during the plant's operations phase. It continues to use it during closure to destroy drained, containerized rocket warheads containing residual amounts of GB nerve agent.

In September 2021, after the final mustard munition was destroyed at BGCAPP, the original SDC, now known as the SDC 1200, began a changeover process. On October 25, 2023, it began destroying drained, containerized rocket warheads containing residual amounts of VX nerve agent.

The containerized rocket warheads, previously drained in the main plant during agent-destruction operations, were classified as agent-contaminated secondary waste.

The SDC 2000 and SDC 1200 completed operations in August and September 2025, respectively, as part of the plant's closure phase.

== Closure ==
State environmental regulators approved the BGCAPP permit modification request for closure September 27, 2023, and the plant is in the closure phase, expected to be completed in Fiscal Year 2028. The plant completed destruction of agent-contaminated secondary waste (see SDC section, above) as part of this phase.

Closure is the final phase of the project, following chemical weapons destruction operations. It encompasses planning, preparation, and disposal of agent-contaminated and non-contaminated secondary waste; facility and equipment decontamination; and decommissioning and demolition of facilities in accordance with public law and U.S. Army direction. In addition, personal property is disposed of, real property is returned to BGAD, environmental permits are closed, and the contract is closed.

== Public outreach ==
The Blue Grass Chemical Stockpile Outreach Office was established in 1996 to serve as the community's primary information resource on chemical weapons destruction in Kentucky. Although the outreach office closed in April 2024 as part of overall BGCAPP closure activities, the BGCAPP outreach staff continued to respond to inquiries, provide information to stakeholders, and interface with the governor-appointed Kentucky Chemical Demilitarization Citizens' Advisory Commission and its Chemical Destruction Community Advisory Board until the closure of the outreach program in 2026. The archive of the public outreach program is available at the Eastern Kentucky University library in Richmond.
