= Pueblo Chemical Depot =

U.S. chemical weapons depot

Coordinates: 38°16′26″N 104°20′34″W

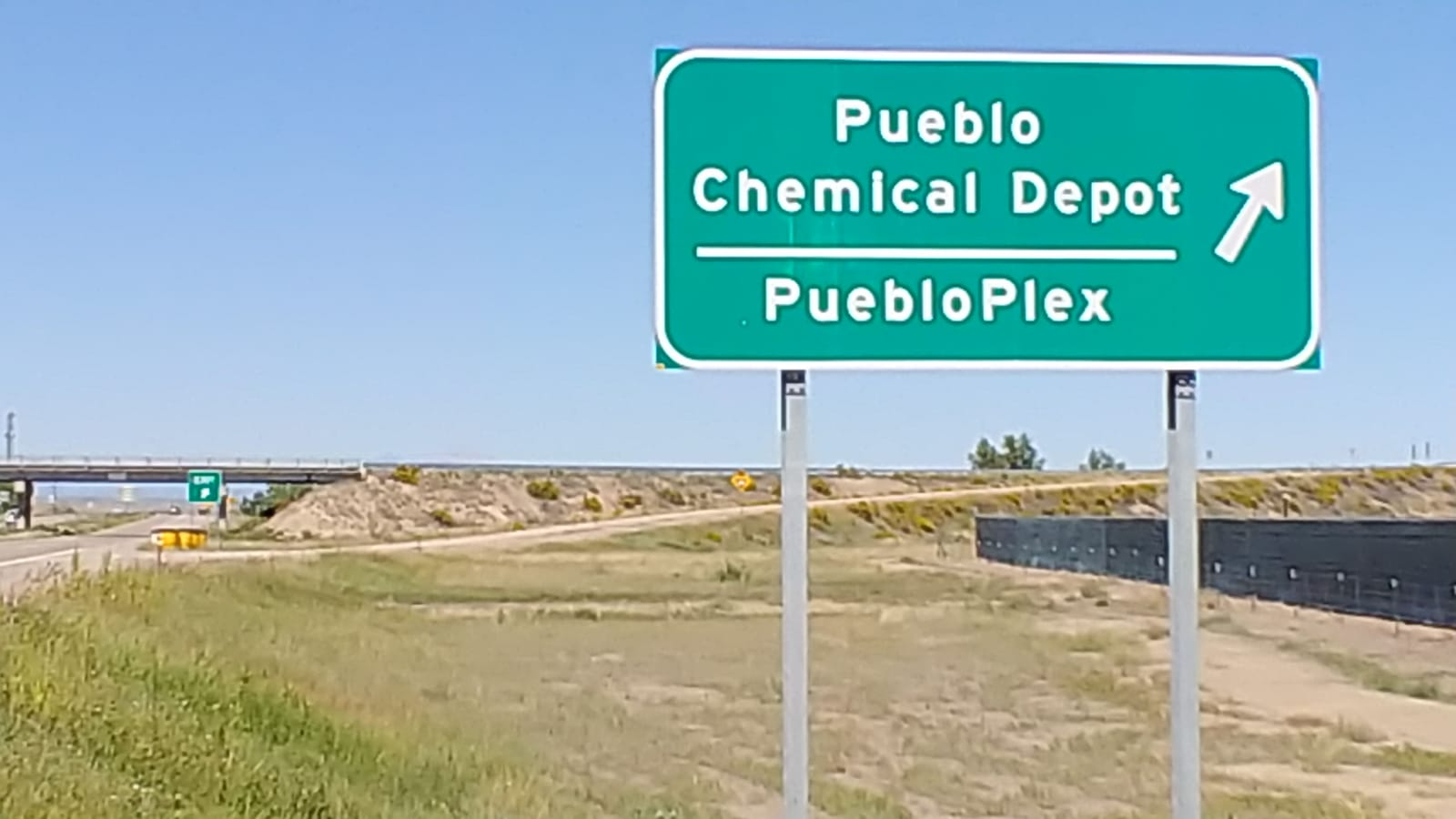
Road sign for the Pueblo Chemical Depot

The Pueblo Chemical Depot was a chemical weapons storage site located in Pueblo County, Colorado, United States. The Pueblo Chemical Depot was one of the last two sites in the United States with chemical munitions and chemical materiel. The Pueblo Chemical Agent Destruction Pilot Plant (PCAPP) which is under the Program Executive Office, Assembled Chemical Weapons Alternatives (PEO ACWA) program destroyed its stockpile of 155mm and 105mm artillery shells and 4.2-inch mortars, all of which contained a form of the chemical agent mustard gas. The United States Army decommissioned the depot on September 12, 2024.

The depot housed 2,613 tons (2,369 metric tons) of mustard agent in approximately 780,000 munitions, equivalent to about seven percent of the original chemical materiel stockpile of the United States. Destruction operations began at the Pueblo Chemical Agent-Destruction Pilot Plant in spring 2015 with full-scale operations beginning later in 2016. Destruction of all munitions was complete by Jun. 22, 2023.

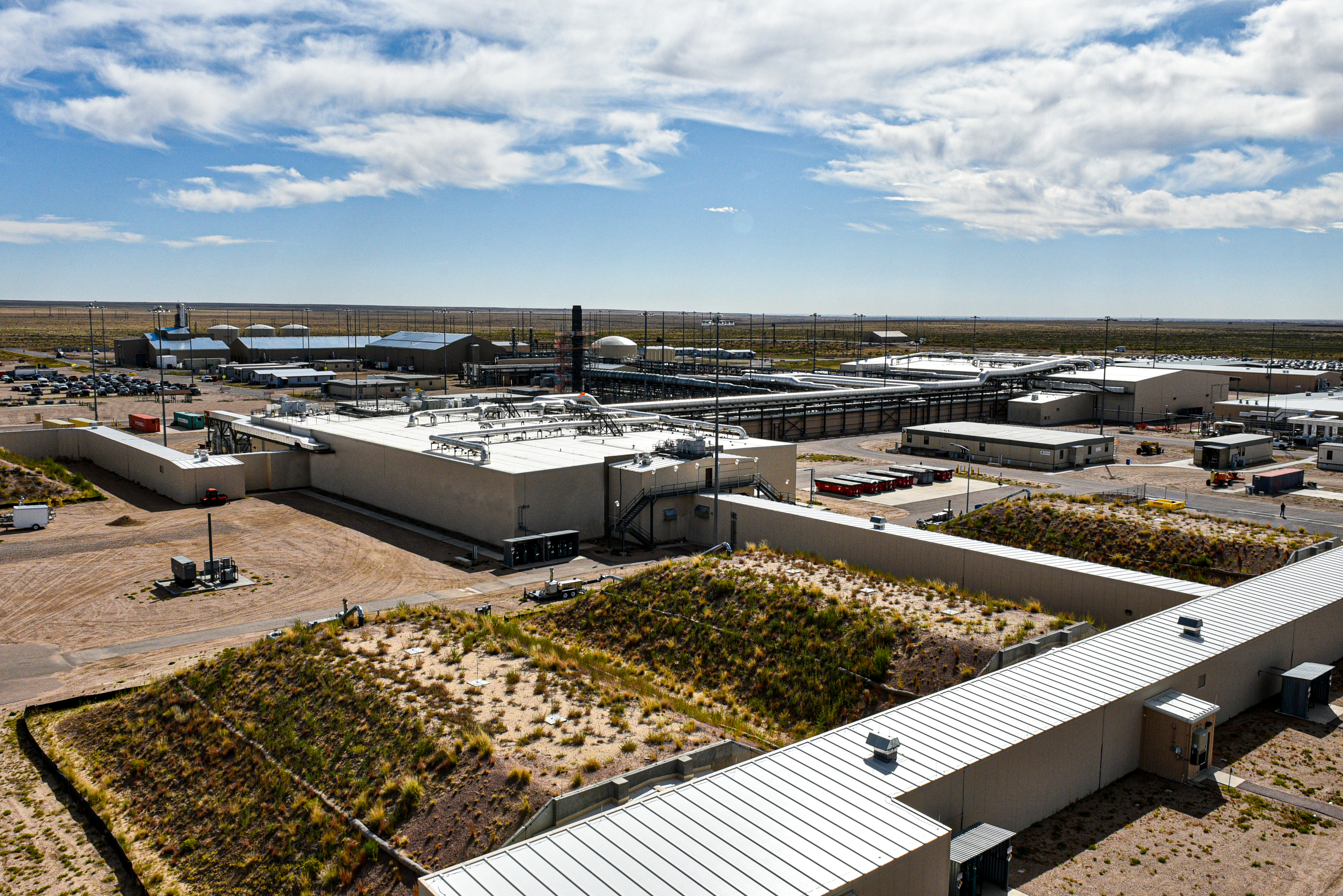
The Pueblo Chemical Weapons Depot

Sulfur agent is destroyed through neutralization and biotreatment. Energetic components are first removed through robotics and disposed. The weapon body is then robotically accessed to wash out the sulfur agent using water at a high pressure. The sulfur agent is neutralized with caustic solution and hot water producing a byproduct of hydrolysate. Biotreatement occurs when the hydrolysate is further broken down with microbes, producing biosludge and water. Biosludge is filtered and sent to a disposal facility. Metal weapon parts are further decontaminated at high heat then recycled The Army's Explosive Destruction System (EDS) was used for problematic munitions that cannot be destroyed through neutralization and biotreatment until December 2018. In 2018, the decision was made to replace the EDS with three Static Detonation Chamber units which will be operational in late 2020. Problematic munitions are those that have leaked or are in poor physical condition making it difficult for automated equipment processing.

A specialized facility named the PCAPP Training Facility is located at the Pueblo Memorial Airport Industrial Park and offers training courses and simulations for employees. Training is designed to ensure the safety of the employees and the surrounding environment. Employees are trained to operate the equipment and use Demilitarization Protective Ensemble or DPE. The DPE is an encapsulated air-supplied chemical protective suit. Samples are taken at multiple stages and analyzed for any leakage of the chemical agent.

The plant operated until all the chemical weapons were destroyed. Closure activities (shut-down, dismantling, and restoration of site) are slated to be wrapped up by 2023. This is far beyond the April 2012 deadline set by the Chemical Weapons Convention. PuebloPlex will head the redevelopment of Pueblo Chemical Depot. Once the mustard agent has been treated and environmental restoration is complete, the depot will be transferred to the community with possibilities of solar farming to contribute energy to the military complex in Colorado Springs, Fort Carson, Peterson and Schriever Air Force bases.

== See also ==
- Pueblo Depot Activity
- Pueblo Chemical Agent-Destruction Pilot Plant
- United States chemical weapons program
