= Pueblo Depot Activity =

U.S. Army chemical weapons storage depot

Pueblo Depot Activity (PUDA)
- Formerly known as Pueblo Army Depot
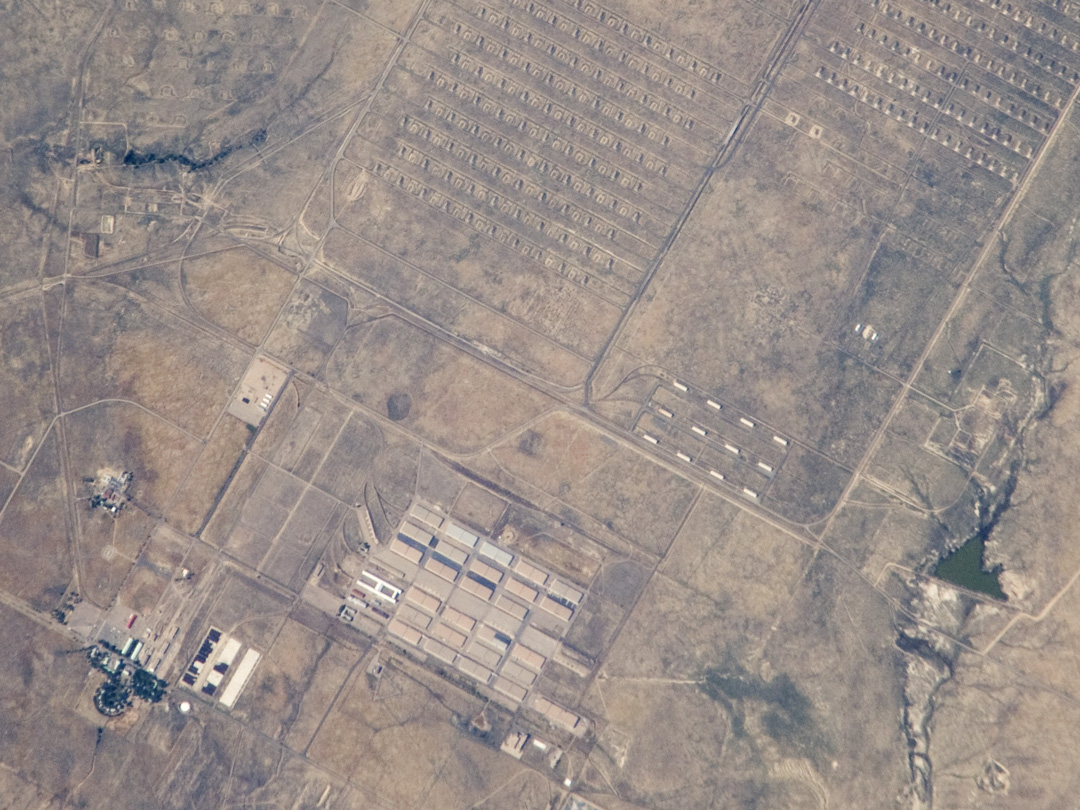
- Munitions bunkers at PUDA (Taken from International Space Station in October 2008)

Pueblo Army Depot
- Began operations: 1942
- Redesignated: 1974
- Subordinate of: Army Ordnance Corps

Pueblo Depot Activity
- Began operations: 1974
- Realigned: 1988
- Subordinate of: Tooele Army Depot

Chemical weapons storage depot
- Began operations: 1952
- Currently Active: Scheduled for closure in 2022
- Subordinate of: US Army Material Command
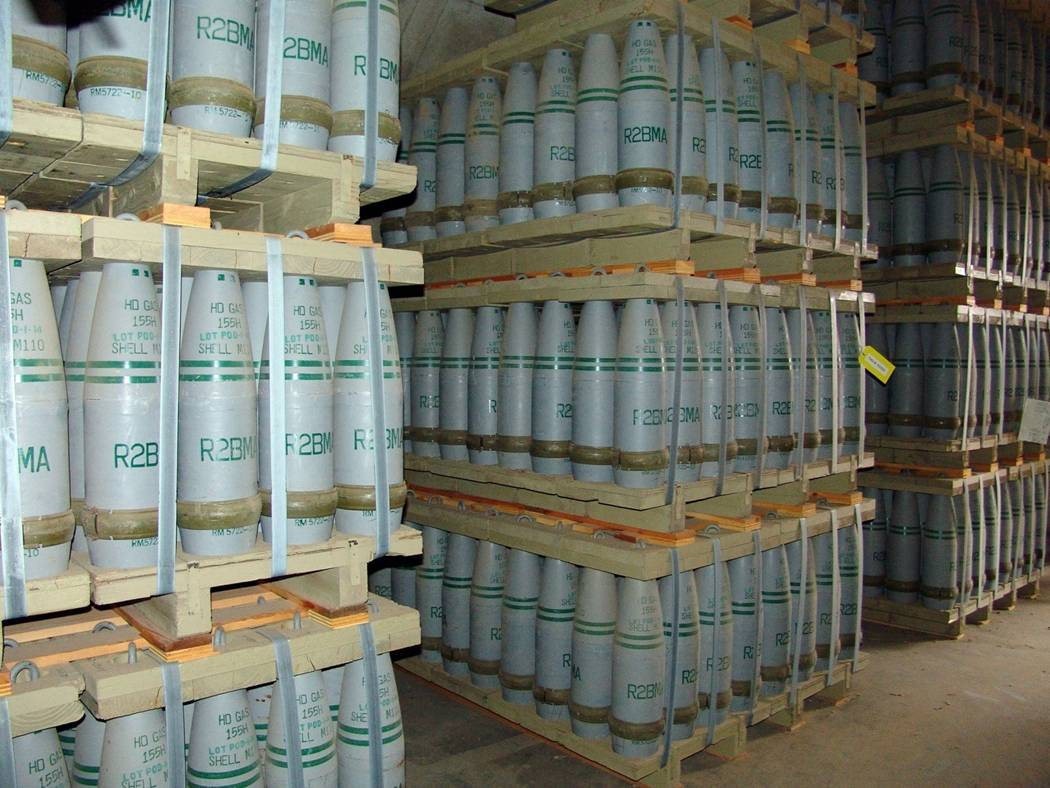
- Pallets of 155 mm artillery shells containing HD (sulfur mustard agent) at Pueblo Depot Activity chemical weapons storage facility.

Pueblo Depot Activity (PUDA), formerly known as the Pueblo Ordnance Depot and the Pueblo Army Depot, was a U.S. Army ammunition storage and supply facility. Responsibility for the depot fell upon the United States Army Ordnance Corps, and the first civilians were hired in 1942 as operations began. The mission quickly expanded to include general supplies as well. It is a 24,202-acre (97.94 km^{2}) site located 14 miles (23 km) east of Pueblo, Colorado at 38°19′37.07″N 104°20′22.4″W. In 1945 they began to receive mass amounts of equipment returning from the combat theaters of World War II. Therefore, the mission expanded yet again to include the maintenance and refurbishing of artillery, fire control, and optical material. In 1951 the depot assumed responsibility to distribute U.S. Air Force ammunition for an eight-state area, as well as storage of strategic and critical materials for the General Services Administration (GSA). They were also tasked to rebuild and provide on-site maintenance support for guided missiles, ensure calibration and maintenance of electronic test equipment and radio-controlled aerial targets. They would also provide specialized training for new Army equipment as needed. In 1952, Rocky Mountain Arsenal in Denver, Colorado transferred chemical agents and chemical munitions to Pueblo Army Depot for secure storage. In 1974 Pueblo Army Depot was redesignated as Pueblo Depot Activity.

Upon this redesignation the missile maintenance mission was transferred to Letterkenny Army Depot in Pennsylvania, and responsibility for the Activity was shifted from Army Ordnance, to Tooele Army Depot in Utah. The Defense Secretary's Commission on Base Realignment and Closure recommended realignment for Pueblo Depot Activity in its 1988 report. This realignment transferred most of the previous responsibilities to other installations. The only remaining mission for the Depot was the secure storage of the chemical agents already there. Responsibility for the Depot shifted from Tooele, to the US Army Materiel Command headquartered at Fort Belvoir, Virginia. The empty bunkers and warehouses which used to store the non-chemical munitions and other supplies as well as repair and manufacturing facilities were turned over to the Pueblo Depot Activity Development Authority who currently offer these properties for civilian lease purposes.

== Lethal Unitary Chemical Agents and Munitions ==
In 1952 Pueblo Depot Activity received its first shipment of chemical agents. These agents were trucked from Rocky Mountain Arsenal in Denver, Colorado. Upon receipt of these munitions for secure storage, PUDA became one of eight installations within the United States where chemical weapons are stored. The depot created an exclusion zone within its bounds specifically for this purpose. It was rather like a depot within a depot. It was designated as the Chemical Depot, of Pueblo Depot Activity. These actions would prove to save the installation from closure when it was considered in 1988. Because of the chemical stockpiles it was realigned rather than closed. It is scheduled for closure in 2022 when it completes what will be its last mission, the safe elimination of all remaining chemical stockpiles. This process began in 2015 and is being done through on-site neutralization.

== See also ==
- Pueblo Chemical Depot
- Pueblo Chemical Agent-Destruction Pilot Plant
