= Blue Grass Army Depot =

Facility of the US Army Sustainment Command in Kentucky

Coordinates: 37.698°N 84.222°W

Blue Grass Army Depot (BGAD) is a U.S. Army Army Sustainment Command storage facility for conventional munitions and chemical weapons. The facility is located in east central Kentucky, southeast of the cities of Lexington and Richmond, Kentucky. The 14,494-acre (58.66 km^{2}) site, composed mainly of open fields and wooded areas, is used for munitions storage, repair of general supplies, and the disposal of munitions. The installation is used for the storage of conventional explosive munitions as well as assembled chemical weapons. The depot primarily is involved in industrial and related activities associated with the storage and maintenance of conventional and chemical munitions.

The tenant organization, Blue Grass Chemical Activity, is responsible for the chemical weapons stored at BGAD. BGCA is part of the Army's Chemical Materials Activity, headquartered in Edgewood, Maryland. The demilitarization of the chemical weapons is the responsibility of a third organization, Assembled Chemical Weapons Alternatives (ACWA).

BGAD provides munitions, chemical defense equipment, and ammunition support to the joint warfighter. It is the Department of Defense's primary center for surveillance, receipt, storage, issue, testing and minor repair for the Chemical Defense Equipment Program. BGAD maintains and supports CDE stocks for deploying units and homeland defense forces, and is a training site for reserve component and other deploying units.

== Capabilities ==
Capabilities include: industrial services support; ammunition maintenance, renovation, disassembly and demilitarization; thermal arc coating for Air Force bombs; water washout facility with flaker belt; molten salt research and development; ultrasonic testing for mortar ammunition; chemical material surveillance; quality assurance and joint logistics support; and ammunition life cycle management.

The depot also serves as a training ground for service members.

== History ==
BGAD was established in 1941 and began operations in 1942 as an ammunition and general supply storage depot, Blue Grass Ordnance Depot. In 1964, it merged with the Lexington Signal Depot in Avon, Kentucky, to become the Lexington-Blue Grass Army Depot. The Lexington facility was selected for closure under BRAC (Base Realignment And Closure); after it closed in September 1999, the remaining facility received its current designation.

In February 2026, U.S. Senator Mitch McConnell announced a nearly $1 billion in federal funding for BGAD as part of the FY 2026 Defense Appropriations bill. Energetics Manufacturing received $903 million to expand manufacturing capacity for energetics materials, (explosives materials). Plus an additional $64+ million towards other BGAD improvements.

== Facilities ==
BGAD is housed on 14,594 acres (5,906 ha) with 1,153 buildings, 902 igloos and storage capacity of 3,233,598 square feet (300,411.1 m^{2}).

== Environmental ==
BGAD is currently working with state and federal regulators on environmental remediation. The installation is in compliance with all state and federal laws and regulations.

== Chemical weapons destruction ==
BGAD stored a small stockpile of chemical agents, comprising 523 short tons (474 t) of nerve agents GB (sarin) and VX, and mustard gas, or about two percent of the United States chemical weapons stockpile.

Beginning in June 2019, destruction of the Blue Grass chemical weapons stockpile, in accordance with the Chemical Weapons Convention, was begun, starting with mustard gas. Operations concluded in 2023. The chemical plant within the facility planned to close in 2027.

Nerve agents were planned to be treated using a technology known as neutralization followed by supercritical water oxidation. This is a different method than the incineration that is used at the larger stockpiles.

== Chemical leaks ==
- December 11–13, 2021: Two minor leaks of mustard gas after a possible tornado through the area damaging one of the systems.
- July 25 – August 6, 2008: Two leaks of mustard gas.
- August 27, 2007: Sarin gas leak.
- July 12, 2008: Sarin gas leak.
- August 6, 2012: Sarin gas leak.
- October 2013: Sarin gas leak.
- August 2017: Mustard gas leak
