= Edgewood Chemical Activity =

U.S. army depot in Edgewood, Maryland, US

Coordinates: 39°23′55″N 76°16′27″W

The Edgewood Chemical Activity (abbreviated ECA) was a U.S. Army site located in Edgewood, Maryland that stored chemical weapons. Its construction was started by Ordnance Corps in November 1917 and completed in less than a year. The arsenal was to employ about 10,000 civilian and military personnel in fabrication of chemical weapons and filling gas shells with phosgene, chlorpicrin, chlorine and mustard gas. Since 1941, the U.S. Army stored approximately five percent of the nation's original chemical agent in steel ton containers, at the Edgewood Area of Aberdeen Proving Ground.

== Aberdeen Chemical Agent Disposal Facility ==
Construction of the Aberdeen Chemical Agent Disposal Facility was completed in 2002, and agent destruction operations began in April 2003. Destruction was completed in February 2006, with 1,622 tons (1,472 metric tons) of agent destroyed. This facility used neutralization followed by bio-treatment to destroy mustard gas agent (HD) drained from ton containers. The facility's permit was officially closed in June 2007.

== See also ==
- Edgewood Arsenal experiments
- United States Army Medical Research Institute of Chemical Defense
