= Supercritical water oxidation =

Process that occurs in water

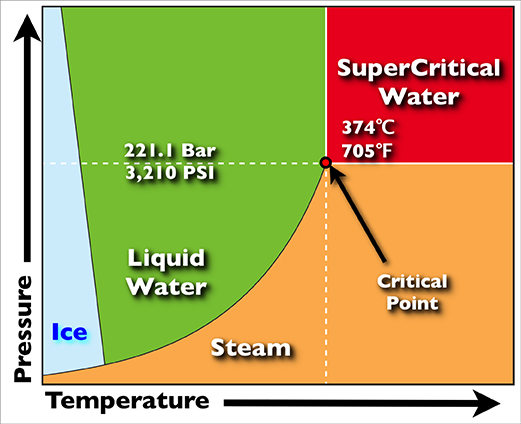
Supercritical Water (Red Area)

Supercritical water oxidation (SCWO) is a process that occurs in water at temperatures and pressures above a mixture's thermodynamic critical point. Under these conditions water becomes a fluid with unique properties that can be used to advantage in the destruction of recalcitrant and hazardous wastes such as polychlorinated biphenyls (PCB) or per- and polyfluoroalkyl substances (PFAS). Supercritical water has a density between that of water vapor and liquid at standard conditions, and exhibits high gas-like diffusion rates along with high liquid-like collision rates. In addition, the behavior of water as a solvent is altered (in comparison to that of subcritical liquid water) such that it behaves much less like a polar solvent. As a result, the solubility behavior is "reversed" so that oxygen, and organics such as chlorinated hydrocarbons become soluble in the water, allowing single-phase reaction of aqueous waste with a dissolved oxidizer. The reversed solubility also causes salts to precipitate out of solution, meaning they can be treated using conventional methods for solid-waste residuals. Efficient oxidation reactions occur at low temperature (400-650 °C) with reduced NOx production.

SCWO can be classified as green chemistry or as a clean technology. The elevated pressures and temperatures required for SCWO are routinely encountered in industrial applications such as petroleum refining and chemical synthesis.

A unique addition (mostly of academic interest) to the world of supercritical water (SCW) oxidation is generating high-pressure flames inside the SCW medium. The pioneer works on high-pressure supercritical water flames were carried out by professor EU Franck at the German University of Karlsruhe in the late 80s. The works were mainly aimed at anticipating conditions which would cause spontaneous generation of non-desirable flames in the flameless SCW oxidation process. These flames would cause instabilities to the system and its components. ETH Zurich pursued the investigation of hydrothermal flames in continuously operated reactors. The rising needs for waste treatment and destruction methods motivated a Japanese Group in the Ebara Corporation to explore SCW flames as an environmental tool. Research on hydrothermal flames has also begun at NASA Glenn Research Center in Cleveland, Ohio.

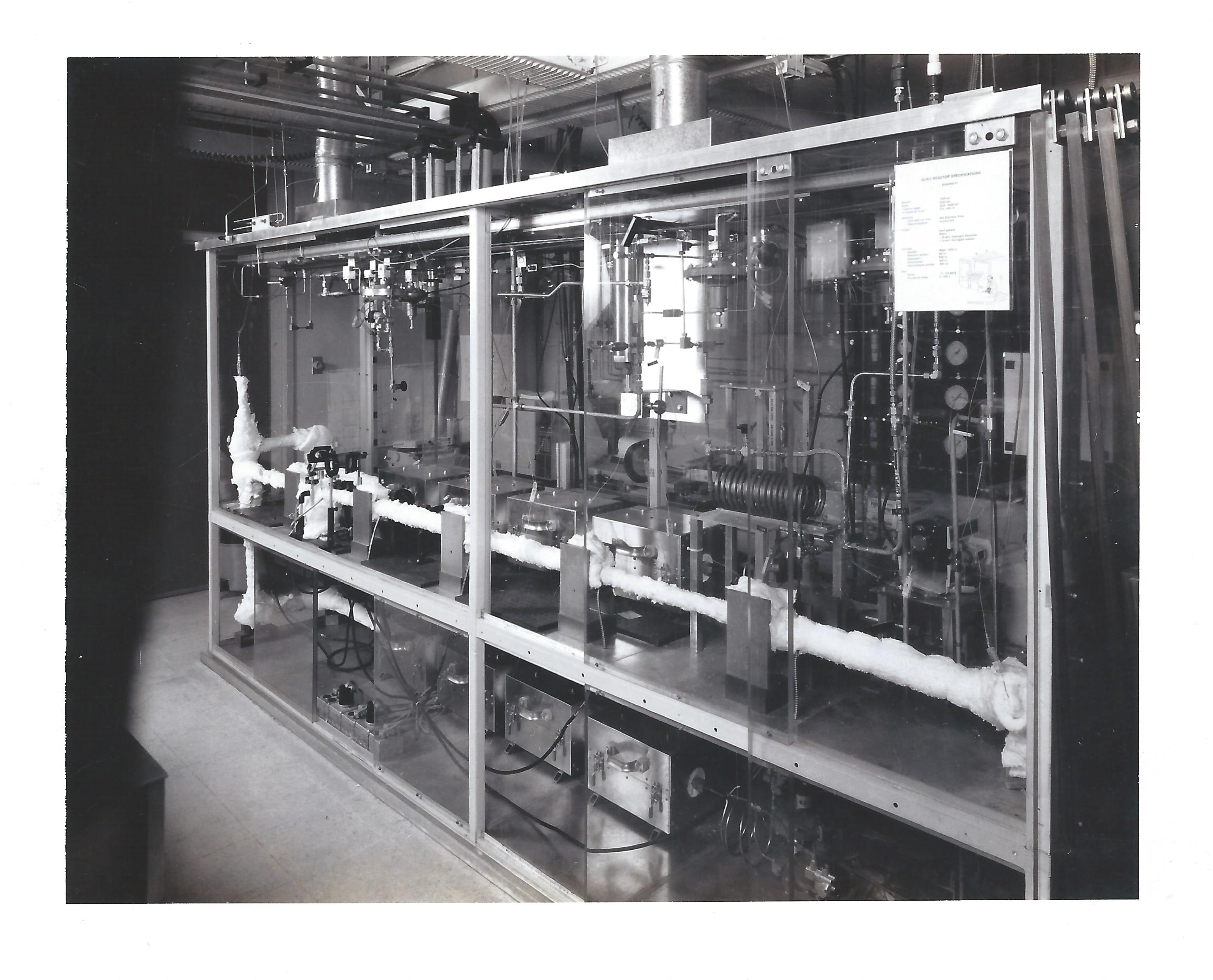
The supercritical fluids reactor (SFR) at Sandia National Laboratories' Combustion Research Facility (CRF), 1995.

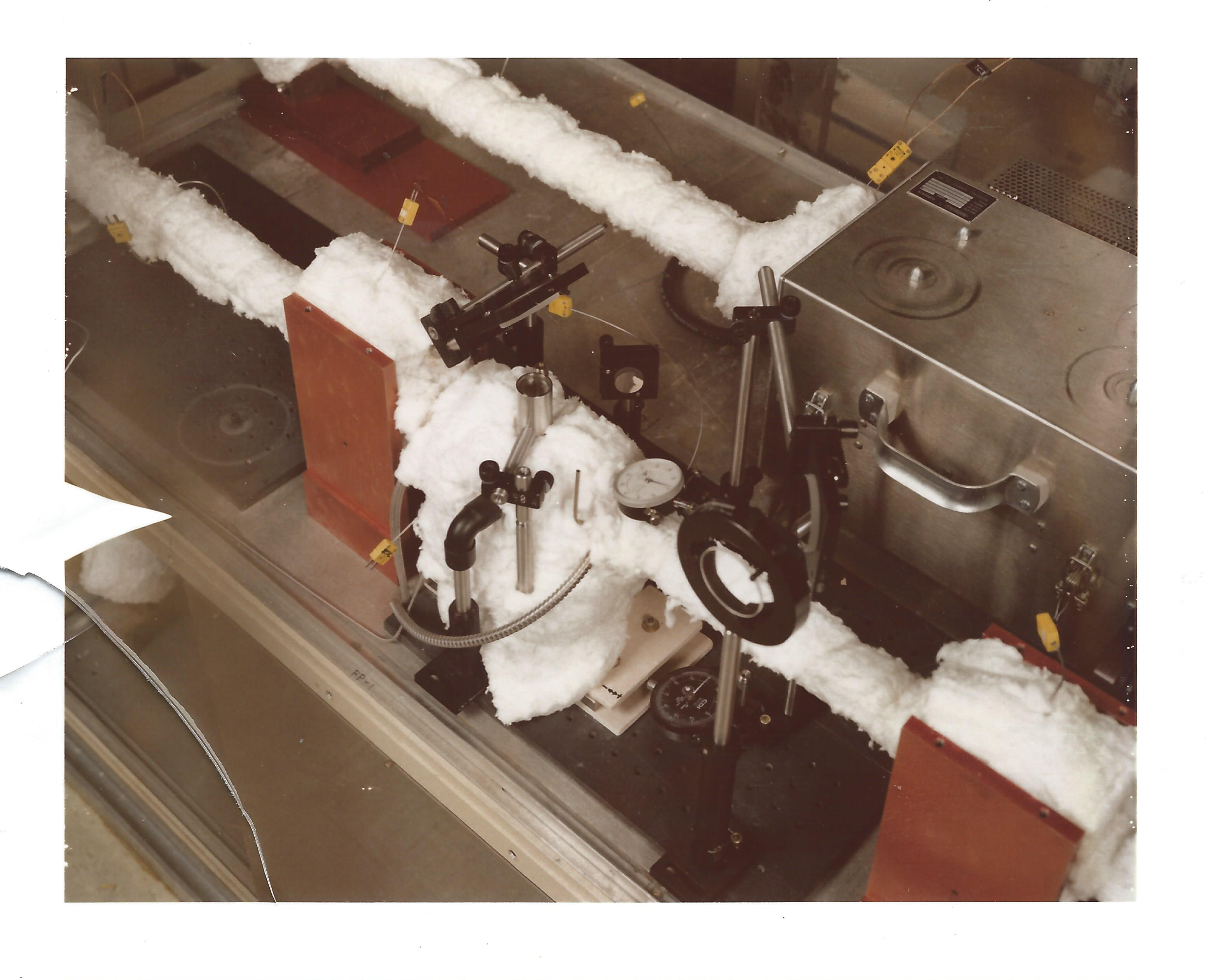
High-pressure, high-temperature optical cell.

== Basic research ==
Basic research on supercritical water oxidation was undertaken in the 1990s at Sandia National Laboratory's Combustion Research Facility (CRF), in Livermore, CA. Originally proposed as a hazardous waste destruction technology in response to the Kyoto Protocol, multiple waste streams were studied by Steven F. Rice and Russ Hanush, and hydrothermal (supercritical water) flames were investigated by Richard R. Steeper and Jason D. Aiken. Among the waste streams studied were military dyes and pyrotechnics, methanol, and isopropyl alcohol. Hydrogen peroxide was used as an oxidizing agent, and Eric Croiset was tasked with detailed measurements of the decomposition of hydrogen peroxide at supercritical water conditions.

In mid-1992, Thomas G. McGuinness, PE invented what is now known as the "transpiring-wall SCWO reactor" (TWR) while seconded to Los Alamos National Laboratory on behalf of Summit Research Corporation. McGuinness subsequently received the first US patent for a TWR in early 1995. The TWR was designed to mitigate problems of salt/solids deposition, corrosion and thermal limitations occurring in other SCWO reactor designs (eg. tubular & vat-type reactors) at the time. The upper part of the vertical reactor incorporates a permeable liner through which a clean fluid permeates to help prevent salts and other solids from accumulating at the inner surface of the liner. The liner also insulates the outer pressure containment vessel from high temperatures within the reaction zone. The liner can be manufactured from a variety of materials resistant to corrosion and high reaction temperatures. The bottom end of the TWR incorporates a "quench cooler" for cooling the reaction byproducts while neutralizing any components that might form acids during transition to subcritical temperature. Proof-of-concept and performance advantages of the TWR for a variety of feedstocks was demonstrated by Eckhard Dinjus and Johannes Abeln at Forschungszentrum Karlsruhe (FZK), via direct comparison between a TWR and an adjacent tubular reactor.

Major engineering challenges were associated with the deposition of salts and chemical corrosion in these supercritical water reactors. Anthony Lajeunesse led the team investigating these issues. To address these issues Lajeunesse designed a transpiring wall reactor which introduced a pressure differential through the walls of an inner sleeve filled with pores to continuously rinse the inner walls of the reactor with fresh water. Russ Hanush was charged with the construction and operation of the supercritical fluids reactor (SFR) used for these studies. Among its design intricacies were the Inconel 625 alloy necessary for operation at such extreme temperatures and pressures, and the design of the high-pressure, high-temperature optical cells used for photometric access to the reacting flows which incorporated 24 carat gold pressure seals and sapphire windows.

== Commercial applications ==
Several companies in the United States are now working to commercialize supercritical reactors to destroy hazardous wastes. Widespread commercial application of SCWO technology requires a reactor design capable of resisting fouling and corrosion under supercritical conditions.

In Japan a number of commercial SCWO applications exist, among them one unit for treatment of halogenated waste built by Organo. In Korea two commercial size units have been built by Hanwha.

In Europe, Chematur Engineering AB of Sweden commercialized the SCWO technology for treatment of spent chemical catalysts to recover the precious metal, the AquaCat process. The unit has been built for Johnson Matthey in the UK. It is the only commercial SCWO unit in Europe and with its capacity of 3000 l/h it is the largest SCWO unit in the world. Chematur's Super Critical Fluids technology was acquired by SCFI Group (Cork, Ireland) who are actively commercializing the Aqua Critox SCWO process for treatment of sludge, e.g. de-inking sludge and sewage sludge. Many long duration trials on these applications have been made and thanks to the high destruction efficiency of 99.9%+ the solid residue after the SCWO process is well suited for recycling – in the case of de-inking sludge as paper filler and in the case of sewage sludge as phosphorus and coagulant. SCFI Group operate a 250 l/h Aqua Critox demonstration plant in Cork, Ireland.

AquaNova Technologies, Inc. is actively commercializing their 2nd-generation transpiring-wall SCWO reactor ("TWR") with a focus on waste treatment and renewable energy applications. AquaNova's patent-pending TWR-SCWO technology is projected to treat a broad variety of wastes, including PFAS, while generating electric power with improved system thermal efficiency. AquaNova's paradigm-changing technology is designed to operate at supercritical and sub-critical pressures, and at higher reaction temperatures than traditional SCWO technology. AquaNova is targeting larger-scale industrial applications. AquaNova Technologies was founded by Tom McGuinness, PE, who is the original inventor of the transpiring-wall reactor (TWR) under US patent 5,384,051.

374Water Inc. is a company offering commercial SCWO systems that convert organic wastes to clean water, energy and minerals. It is spun out after more than seven years of research and development funded by the Bill & Melinda Gates Foundation to Prof. Deshusses laboratory based at Duke University. The founders of 374Water, Prof. Marc Deshusses and Kobe Nagar, possess the waste processing reactor patent relevant to SCWO. 374Water is actively commercializing its AirSCWO systems for the treatment of biosolids and wastewater sludges, organic chemical wastes, and PFAS wastes including unspent Aqueous Film Forming Foams (AFFFs), rinsates or spent resins and adsorption media. The first commercial sale was announced in February 2022.

Aquarden Technologies (Skaevinge, Denmark) provides modular SCWO plants for the destruction of hazardous pollutants such as PFAS, pesticides, and other problematic hydrocarbons in industrial wastestreams. Aquarden is also providing remediation of hazardous energetic wastes and chemical warfare agents with SCWO, where a full-scale SCWO system has been operating for some years in France for the Defense Industry.

Revive Environmental Technology, based in the United States, has commercialized a transportable SCWO-based system known as the PFAS Annihilator® for the destruction of per- and polyfluoroalkyl substances (PFAS). The system has demonstrated 99.99% destruction efficiency across a broad range of PFAS compounds, including long-chain and short-chain variants, in diverse matrices such as landfill leachate, aqueous film-forming foams (AFFFs), and industrial wastewater. The technology has been proven both in laboratory settings and in permitted commercial operations in Columbus, Ohio, and Grand Rapids, Michigan, with third-party laboratories validating its performance through a formal certificate of destruction protocol.

== See also ==
- Supercritical fluid
- Wet oxidation
- Incineration
