= M134 (disambiguation) =

The M134 Minigun is a six-barrel rotary machine gun.

M134 or M-134 may also refer to:

- M134 bomblet, a 1950s American chemical sub-munition
- M-134 (Michigan highway), a state highway in Michigan
- SIGABA, or Converter M-134, a historic cipher machine
