= M43 =

M43 may refer to:

- M43 BZ cluster bomb
- M43 field cap, a piece of German headgear
- M-43 (Michigan highway), a state highway in Michigan
- M43 (Johannesburg), a Metropolitan Route in Johannesburg, South Africa
- M43 (Pretoria), a Metropolitan Route in Pretoria, South Africa
- M43 (Durban), a Metropolitan Route near Durban, South Africa
- M43 mortar, a Soviet weapon
- M43 Howitzer Motor Carriage, an American self-propelled artillery vehicle
- M43 motorway (Hungary), a Hungarian Motorway
- BMW M43, a 1991 automobile piston engine
- Dodge M43, the ambulance variant of the Dodge M37
- Messier 43, a nebula near the Orion Nebula
- M43, the original designation for the 7.62×39mm Soviet carbine and rifle round
- the 43rd Mersenne prime
- Micro Four Thirds system lens mount standard for mirrorless interchangeable lens digital cameras
- Model 43 grenade, a German hand grenade introduced during World War II
- M43 Postcode in Greater Manchester
