= M44 generator cluster =

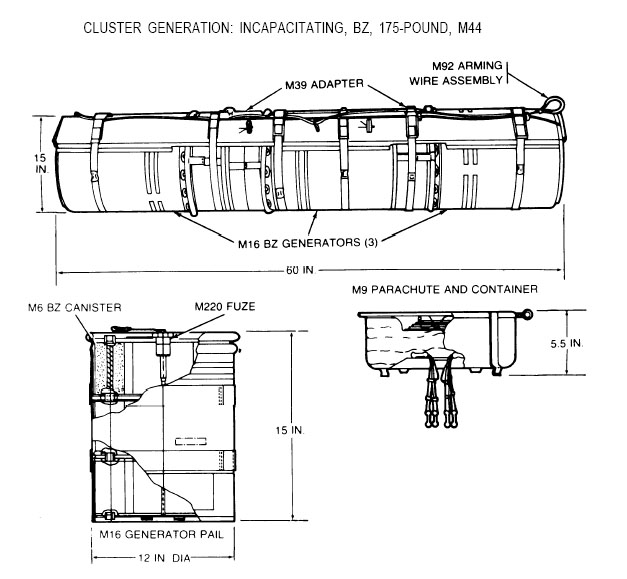
This U.S. Army rendering illustrates the various components of the M44

The M44 generator cluster was an American chemical cluster bomb designed to deliver the incapacitating agent BZ. It was first mass-produced in 1962 and all stocks of the weapons were destroyed by 1989.

== History ==
The United States Army Chemical Corps renewed their chemical warfare (CW) program's focus in the early 1960s. This refocusing led to the pursuit of weapons utilizing agent BZ. In March 1962 the U.S. Army first began mass-production of the M44 generator cluster, along with the M43 BZ cluster bomb.

Despite reaching mass-production ("standardization" in military jargon) levels, the M44 and the M43 were never truly integrated into the main U.S. chemical arsenal. In total, around 1,500 of the M44s and M43s were produced. All U.S. BZ munitions and agent stockpiles were stored at Pine Bluff Arsenal. The entire U.S. BZ stockpile, including the M44s, were demilitarized and destroyed between 1988 and 1989.

== Specifications ==
The M44 had a diameter of 15 inches (380 mm) and a length of 60 inches (1.5 m). Weighing 175 pounds (79 kg) the M44 generator cluster was a cluster bomb which was designed to deliver approximately 39 pounds (18 kg) of the chemical incapacitating agent BZ.

The weapon's sub-munitions are a combination of various components. Three M16 BZ smoke generators were held together in an M39 cluster adapter and its M92 wire assembly; the M39 essentially bound and buckled the generators together. Each generator also held its own parachute, complete with harnesses and its own container. Also within the generator was its "generator pail" which contained the M6 canisters, the part of the sub-munition that held the BZ. Each of the M44s three generator pails held 42 M6 canisters, a total of 126. The canisters were arranged in 14 three-canister tiers and each one held about 5 ounces (140 g) of agent BZ.

== Issues ==
The M44s relatively small production numbers were due, like all U.S. BZ munitions, to a number of shortcomings. The M44 dispensed its agent in a cloud of white, particulate smoke. This was especially problematic because the white smoke was easily visible and BZ exposure was simple to prevent; a few layers of cloth over the mouth and nose are sufficient. There were a number of other factors that made BZ weapons unattractive to military planners. BZ had a delayed and variable rate-of-action, as well as a less than ideal "envelope-of-action". In addition, BZ casualties exhibited bizarre behavior, 50 to 80 percent had to be restrained to prevent self-injury during recovery. Others exhibited distinct symptoms of paranoia and mania.

== See also ==
- M34 cluster bomb
