= M125 =

M125 may refer to:

- M125 bomblet
- M125 mortar carrier based on the M113 armored personnel carrier
- M123 and M125 10-ton 6x6 trucks
- M-125 (Michigan highway)
- M125 (New York City bus)
- Palm m125 personal digital assistant
