= M138 =

M138 can refer to:

- M138 bomblet
- M-138 (Michigan highway)
- M-138-A, a cypher machine
- Snecma M138, a proposed turboprop engine for the Airbus A400M aircraft
