= MGR-1 Honest John =

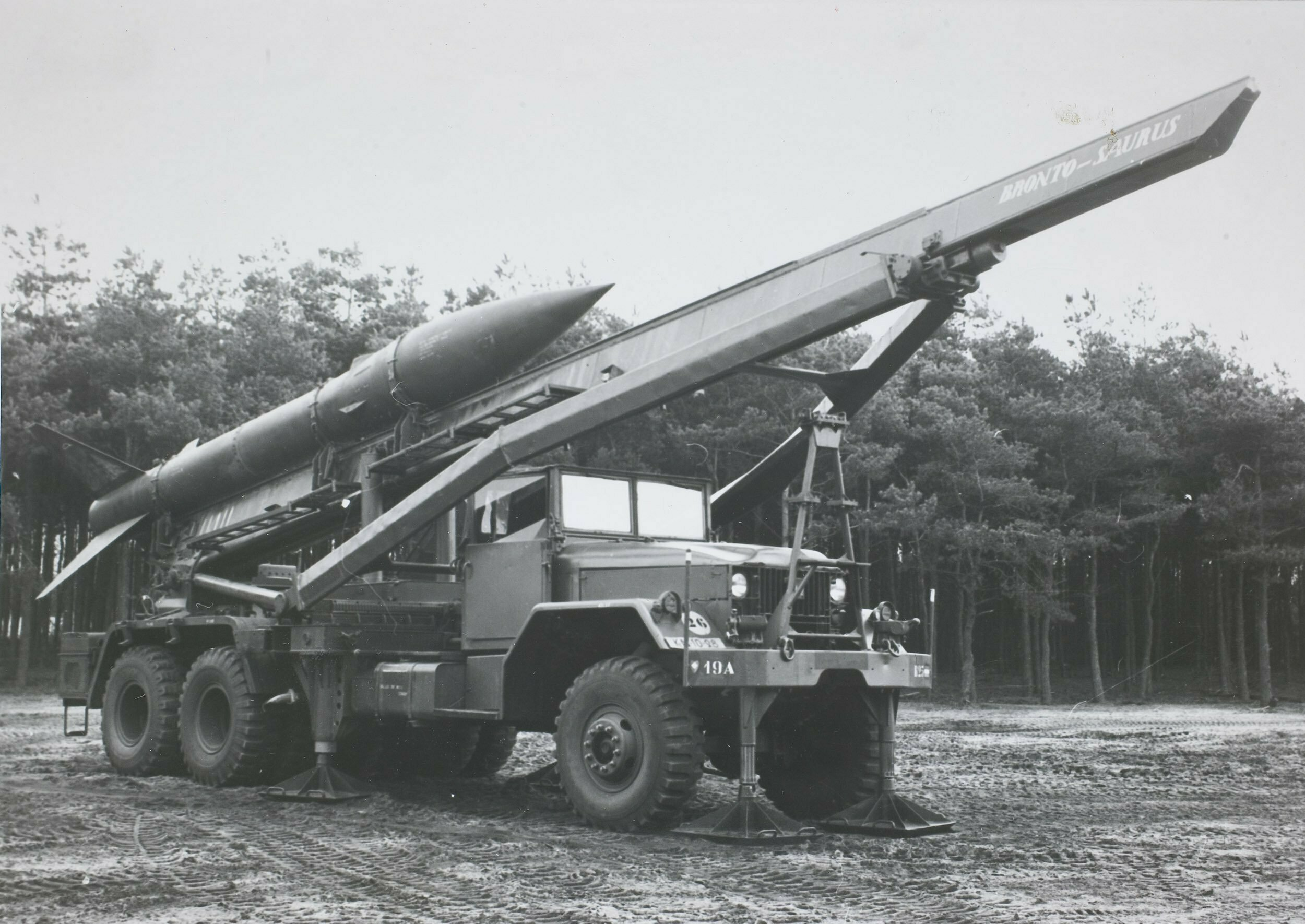
- MGR-1A (M31 series) "Honest John" rocket on the M386 transporter/launcher truck of the Royal Netherlands Army
- Type: Nuclear-capable surface-to-surface rocket
- Place of origin: United States

Service history
- In service: 1953–91
- Used by: Belgium, Canada, Denmark, France, Germany, Greece, Italy, Netherlands, Norway, South Korea, Taiwan, Turkey, UK, and US
- Wars: Cold War

Production history
- Manufacturer: Douglas Aircraft Company
- No. built: 7000+
- Variants: MGR-1A, MGR-1B, MGR-1C

Specifications (MGR-1A)
- Mass: 5,820 lb (2,640 kg)
- Length: 27 ft 3 in (8.30 m)
- Diameter: 30 inches (760 mm)
- Wingspan: 9 ft 1 in (2.77 m)
- Engine: Hercules M6 solid-fueled rocket 99,000 lb_{f} (441 kN)
- Propellant: Double base solid propellant
- Operational range: 3.4–15.4 mi (5.5–24.8 km)
- Flight ceiling: 30,000 ft (9 km)+
- Maximum speed: Mach 2.3

The MGR-1 Honest John rocket was the first nuclear-capable surface-to-surface rocket in the United States arsenal. (Note: The first nuclear-authorized guided missile was the MGM-5 Corporal.) Originally designated Artillery Rocket XM31, the first unit was tested on 29 June 1951, with the first production rounds delivered in January 1953. Its designation was changed to M31 in September 1953. The first Army units received their rockets by year's end and Honest John battalions were deployed in Europe in early 1954. Alternatively, the rocket was capable of carrying an ordinary high-explosive warhead weighing 1,500 pounds (680 kg).

== History and development ==
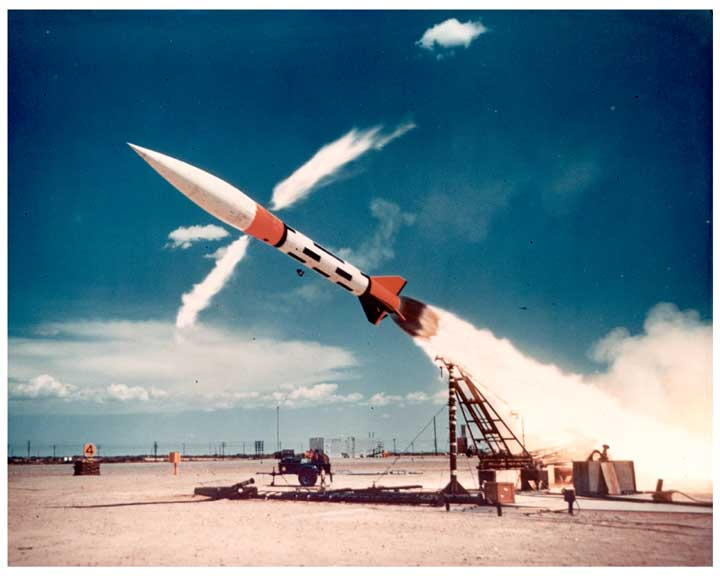
Honest John test launch

Developed at Redstone Arsenal, Alabama, the Honest John was a large but simple fin-stabilized, unguided artillery rocket weighing 5,820 pounds (2,640 kg) in its initial M31 nuclear-armed version. Mounted on the back of a truck, the rocket was aimed in much the same way as a cannon and then fired up an elevated ramp, igniting four small spin rockets as it cleared the end of the ramp. The M31 had a range of 15.4 miles (24.8 km) with a 20 kiloton nuclear warhead and was also capable of carrying a 1,500-pound (680 kg) conventional warhead.

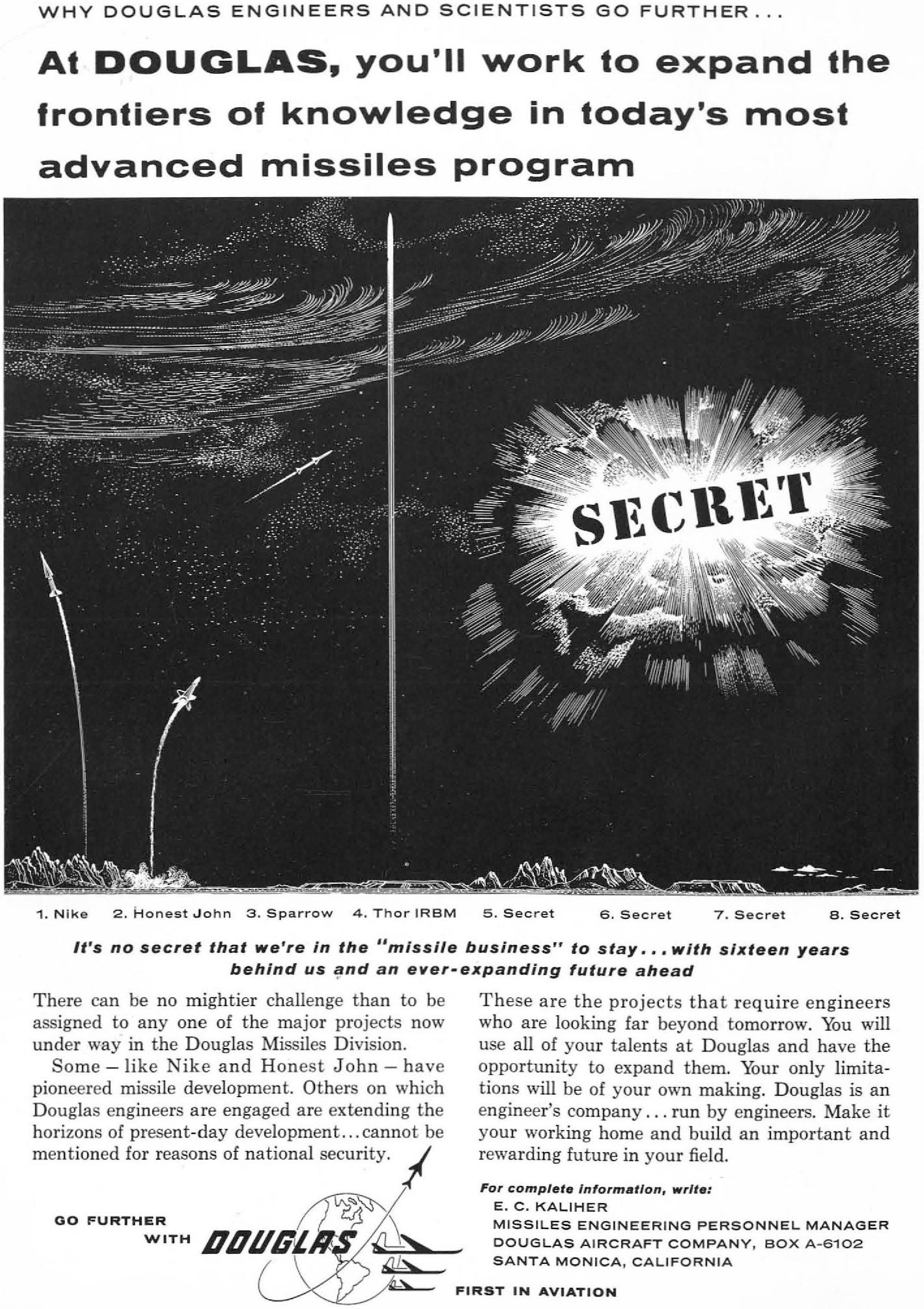
"It's no secret we're in the 'missile business' to stay..." Douglas Aircraft Company ad in the California Institute of Technology 1958 yearbook

The M31 system included a truck-mounted, unguided, solid-fueled rocket transported in three separate parts. The Honest John was assembled in the field before launch, mounted on an M289 launcher, and aimed and fired in about 5 minutes. The rocket was originally outfitted with a W7 nuclear warhead, with a variable yield of up to 20 kilotons of TNT (84 TJ); in 1959, a W31 warhead with three variants was deployed with yields of 2, 10 or 30 kt (8.4, 41.8 or 125.5 TJ). There was a W31 variant of 20 kt (84 TJ) used exclusively for the Nike Hercules anti-aircraft system. The M31 had a range between 3.4 and 15.4 mi (5.5 and 24.8 km).

Early tests exhibited more scatter on target than was acceptable when carrying conventional payloads. Development of an upgraded Honest John, M50, was undertaken to improve accuracy and extend range. The size of the fins was greatly reduced to eliminate weathercocking. Increased spin was applied to restore the positive stability margin that was lost when fin size was reduced. The improved M50, with the smaller fins and more "rifling", had a maximum range of 30+ miles with a scatter on target of only 250 yards (230 m), demonstrating an accuracy approaching that of tube artillery. The Honest John was manufactured by the Douglas Aircraft Company of Santa Monica, California.

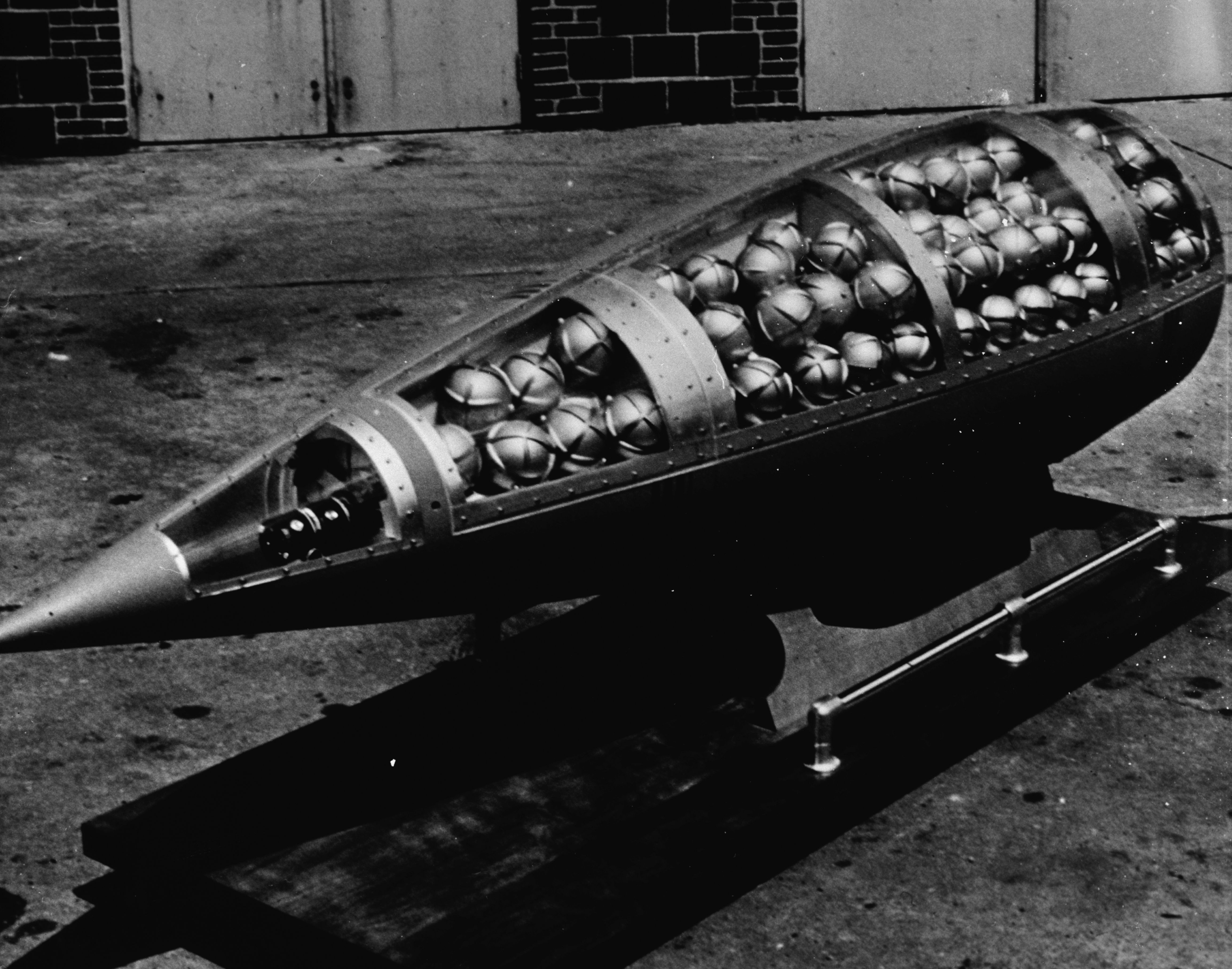
Honest John warhead cutaway, showing M134 sarin bomblets (photo c. 1960)

In the 1960s, Sarin nerve gas cluster munitions were also available, designed to be interchangeable for use with either the Honest John or MGM-5 Corporal. Initially the M79 (E19R1) GB cluster warhead, containing 356 M134 (E130R1) bomblets for the M31A1C Honest John. The production model was the M190 (E19R2) GB cluster warhead, containing 356 M139 (E130R2) bomblets when the M31A1C was phased out in favor of the XM50 Honest John. Under nominal conditions it had a mean area of effect of 0.9 square kilometers.

== Variants ==
The two basic versions of Honest John were:

- MGR-1A (M31) was 27 ft 3 in (8.30 m) long, had an engine diameter of 22 7/8 in (580 mm), a warhead diameter of 30 in (760 mm), a fin span of 9 ft 1 in (2.77 m), weighed 5,820 lb (2,640 kg) (nuclear), and had a range of 3.4–15.4 mi (5.5–24.8 km). The Hercules Powder Company M6 solid-fueled rocket motor was 16 feet 5 7/16 inches (5.015 m) long, weighed 3,937 pounds (1,786 kg), and had 99,000 lb_{f} (441 kN) thrust. (Note: 90,325 lbf (401.79 kN) according to "Solid". Encyclopedia Astronautica. Mark Wade. 2019. Archived from the original on 15 August 2016. "The X-201 [...] was the forerunner of an entire family of related propulsion units that served as boosters for the Nike, Terrier, Talos, and Honest John missiles.")
- MGR-1B (M50) was 26 ft 0 in (7.92 m) long, had an engine diameter of 22.8 inches (580 mm), a warhead diameter of 30 inches (760 mm), a fin span of 4 ft 6 in (1.37 m), weighed 4,320 lb (1,960 kg) (nuclear), and had a maximum range of 30 mi (48 km), practically twice that of the M31. An improved propellant formulation gave the rocket motor 150,000 lb_{f} (666 kN) thrust.

== Production and deployment ==
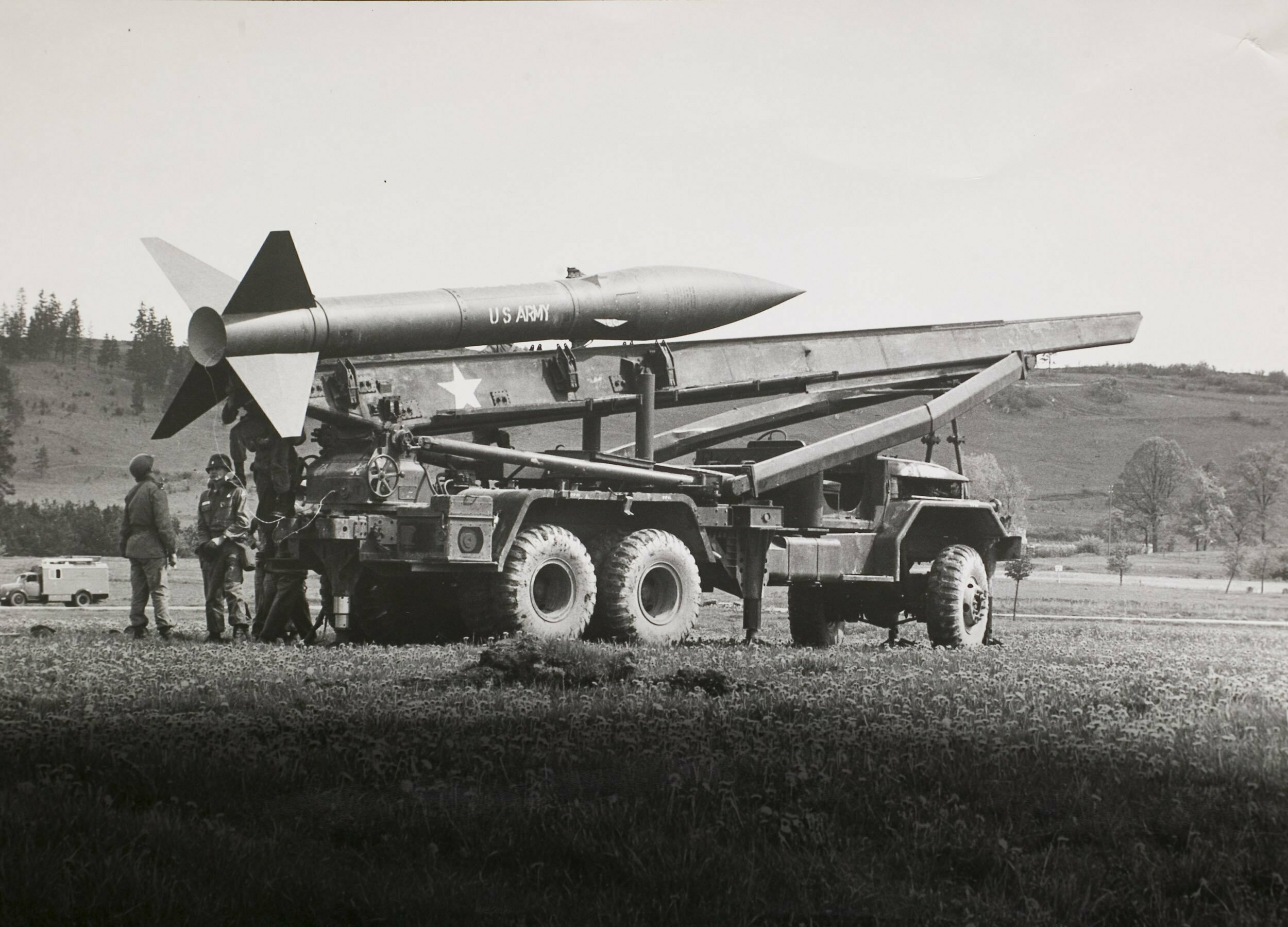
US Army launcher vehicle based on the M139D 5-ton truck

Production of the MGR-1 variants finished in 1965, with a total production run of more than 7,000 rockets. The Honest John's bulbous nose and distinctive truck-mounted launch ramp made it an easily recognized symbol of the Cold War at army bases worldwide and National Guard armories in the U.S.. Even though it was unguided and the first U.S. nuclear ballistic missile, it had a longer service life than all other U.S. ballistic missiles except the Minuteman system. The system was replaced with the MGM-52 Lance missile in 1973, but was deployed with the National Guard units in the United States as late as 1983. Conventionally armed Honest Johns remained in the arsenals of Greece, Turkey and South Korea until at least the late 1990s.

By the time the last Honest Johns were withdrawn from Europe in the late 1980s (and replaced by the unguided M-26 artillery rocket), the rocket had served with the military forces of Belgium, Britain, Canada, Denmark (non-nuclear), France, Germany, Greece, Italy, the Netherlands, Norway (non-nuclear), South Korea, Taiwan (non-nuclear), and Turkey.

== Name origin ==
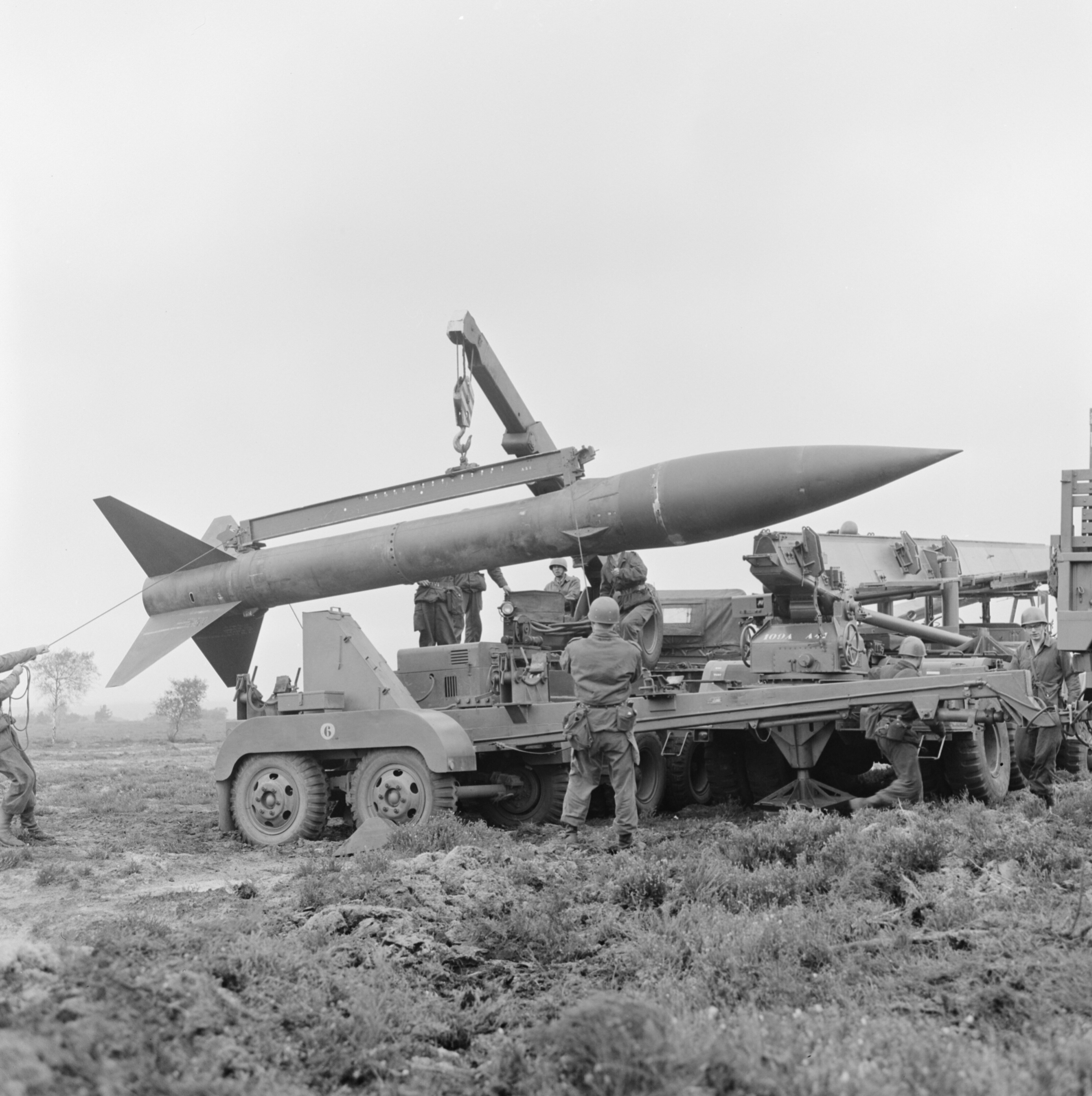
Unloading a rocket from the M329 transport trailer.

In late 1950, Major General Holger Toftoy was a colonel overseeing the development of the rocket. The project was in danger of cancellation "on the grounds that such a large unguided rocket could not possibly have had the accuracy to justify further funds." On a trip to White Sands Missile Range, Toftoy met a Texan man who was prone to making unbelievable statements. Whenever anyone expressed doubt about the man's claims, he would respond, "Why, around these parts, I'm called 'Honest John!'" Because the project was being questioned, Toftoy felt that the nickname was appropriate for the rocket and suggested the name to his superiors.

== Support vehicles ==
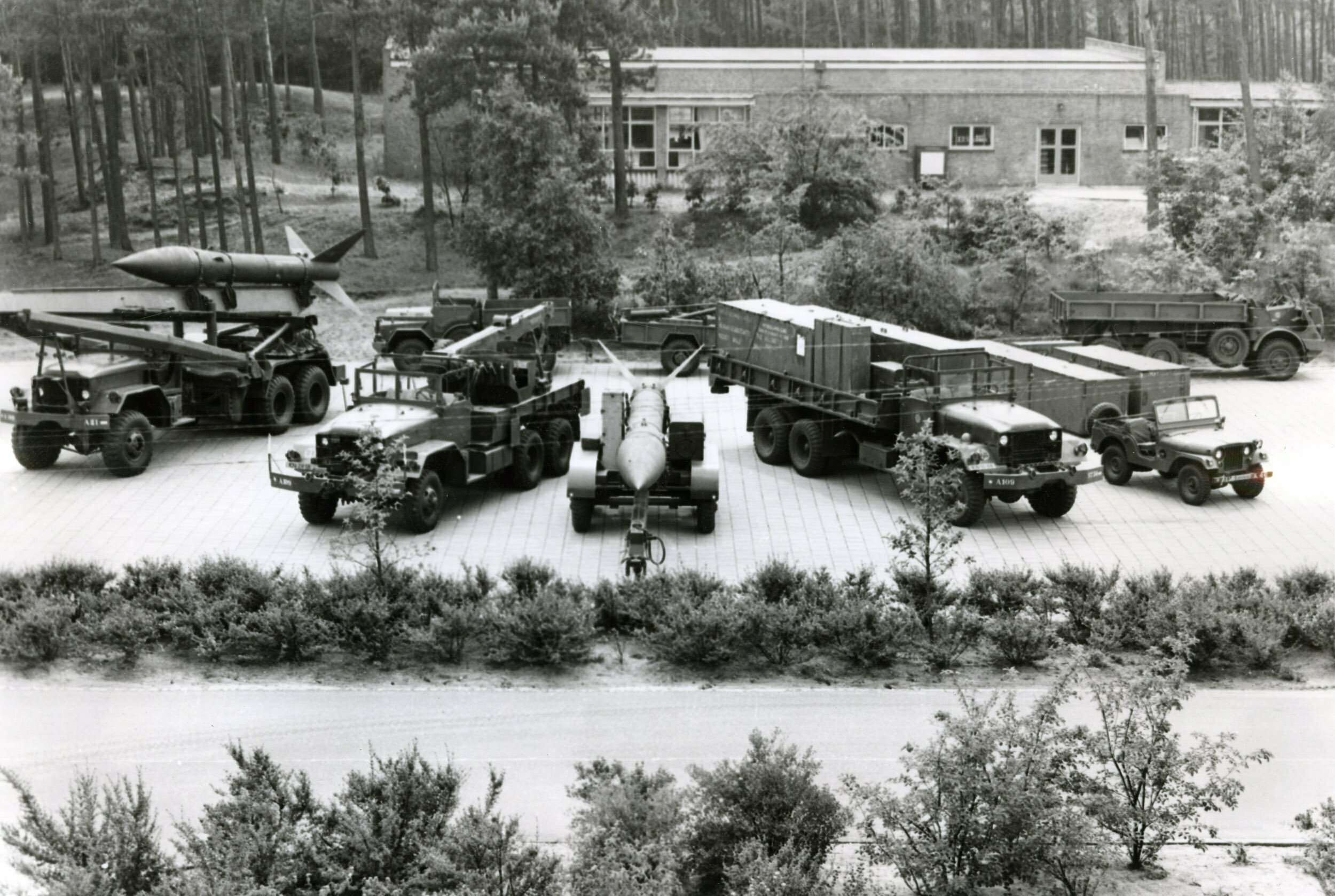
Vehicles and components of the Dutch-operated Honest John rocket system. From left to right: M386 launcher based on the M139 5-ton truck, M62 wrecker/crane, M329 rocket transport trailer, M78A1 truck-mounted heating and tie-down unit and Willys M38A1 light utility truck. Prime movers in the rear.

Vehicles used with the Honest John platform:

- M33 trailer, launcher,
- M46 truck, heating and tie down unit (G744)
- M289 truck, rocket launcher, (M139 truck) (G744),
- M329 trailer, rocket transporter, (G821)
- M386 Truck, Rocket, 762 mm, short launch rail, 5-ton (M139 truck)
- M405 handling unit, trailer mounted,
- M465 cart assembly, transport, 762 mm rocket,

== Surviving examples ==
"Weapons of the Field Artillery" (1966).

Belgium

- Gunfire Braaschaat museum, Province of Antwerpen, Braaschat.

Canada

- CFB Petawawa Military Museum, CFB Petawawa, Petawawa, Ontario.
- The Central Museum of The Royal Regiment of Canadian Artillery, Shilo Manitoba
- Outdoor Display of 2 Warheads, Canadian Forces Logistics Training Center Ammo School, CFB Borden, Borden, Ontario.

Denmark

- The Royal Danish Arsenal Museum
- Sea War Museum Jutland, Thyborøn

"The Pentatomic Army" (1957).

Netherlands

- The National Military Museum

United Kingdom

- Imperial War Museum Duxford
- Royal Air Force Museum

United States

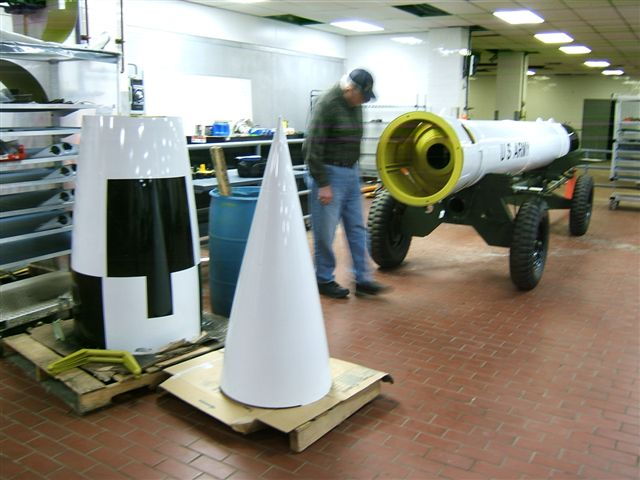
Restored Honest John on M465 cart at Carolinas Aviation Museum

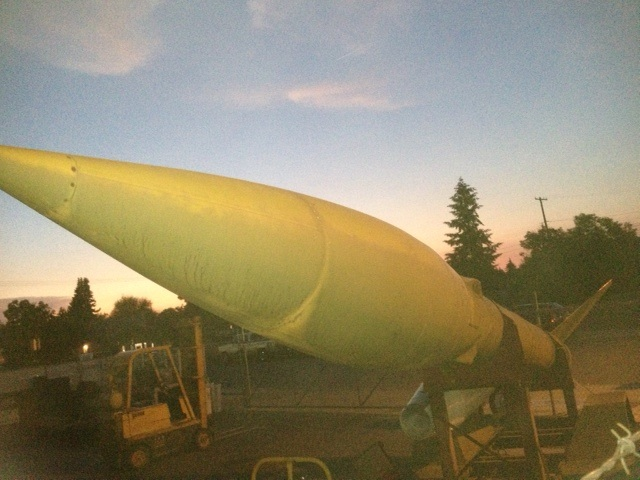
Honest John at Hillyard, WA

- 3rd Cavalry Museum, 1st Cav Museum, Fort Hood, Texas
- 45th Infantry Museum, Oklahoma City, Oklahoma
- Air Force Space & Missile Museum, Cape Canaveral Air Force Station, Florida
- American Armoured Foundation, Inc. Tank & Ordnance War Memorial Museum, Danville, Virginia
- Bedford, Indiana, displayed outside a military surplus store, at the southwest corner of US-50/IN-37 and IN-450.
- Camp Atterbury Military Museum, Camp Atterbury, Indiana.
- Carolinas Aviation Museum, Charlotte, North Carolina (Two missiles are on display – both came from the Florence Air & Missile Museum)
- Crestwood, Illinois, on display at municipal park.
- Combat Air Museum, Topeka, Kansas
- Fort Lewis Museum, Fort Lewis, Washington
- Field Artillery Museum, Fort Sill, Oklahoma
- National Atomic Museum, Kirtland AFB, Albuquerque, New Mexico
- Rock Island Arsenal, Arsenal Island, between Iowa and Illinois
- Texas Military Forces Museum at Camp Mabry, Austin, Texas
- Underwood Public School, Underwood, Minnesota.
- United States Space & Rocket Center, Huntsville, Alabama
- Yuma Proving Ground, Yuma, Arizona
- Milledgeville High School, Milledgeville, Illinois (home of the Milledgeville Missiles)
- Miami Central High School Miami, Florida Home of the "ROCKETS".
- A.C. Reynolds High School Asheville, North Carolina Home of the "ROCKETS".
- Outdoor display, Spokane, Washington – southwest corner of Sanson and Market in Hillyard neighborhood
- Outdoor display, St. Albans Roadside Park, St. Albans, West Virginia
- Outdoor display, White Sands Missile Range Museum, New Mexico
- Neenah High School, Neenah, Wisconsin
- Outdoor display, M50 from 6th Bn 112th FA on display at the Armory in Cape May Courthouse, Cape May, New Jersey.
- Outdoor display, Hull Street Outlet Inc., Richmond, Virginia.
- Outdoor display, Trumann Middle School, Trumann, Arkansas

== Operators ==
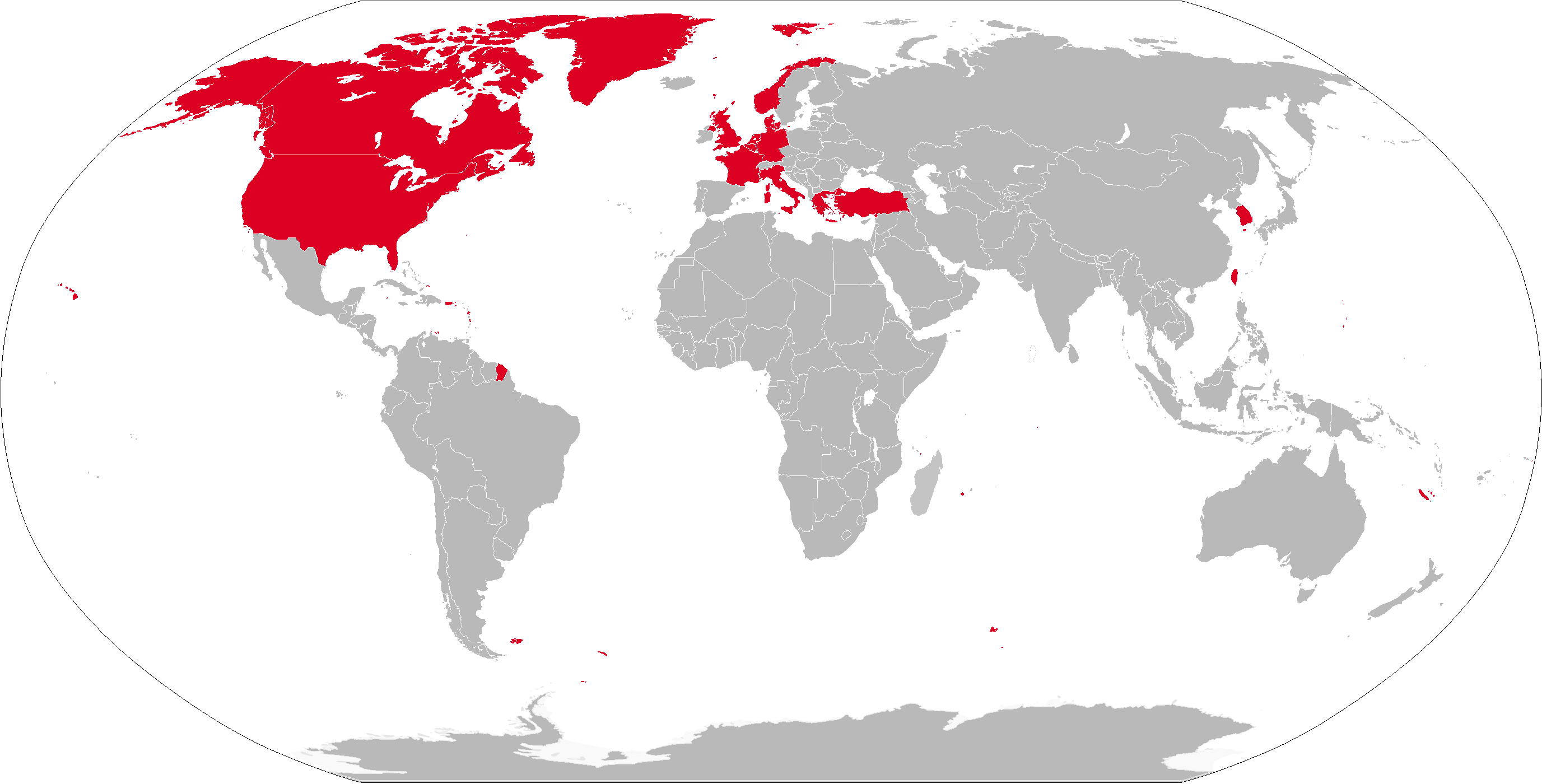
Map with former MGR-1 operators in red

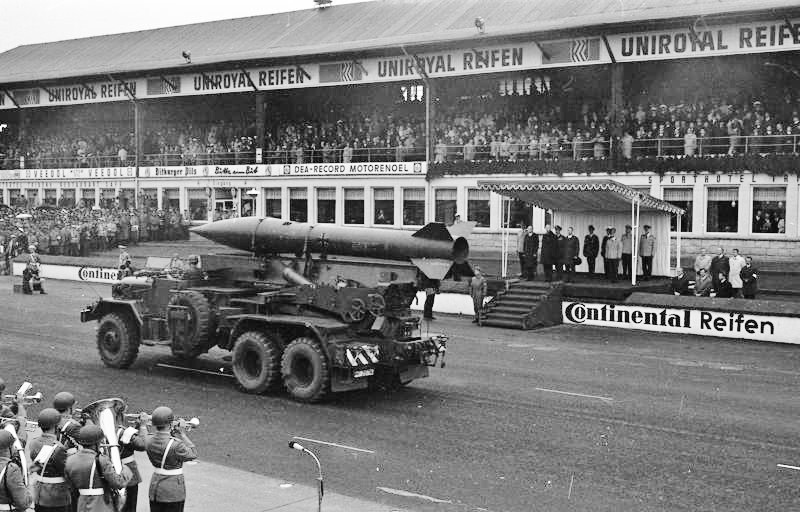
West German parade in 1969

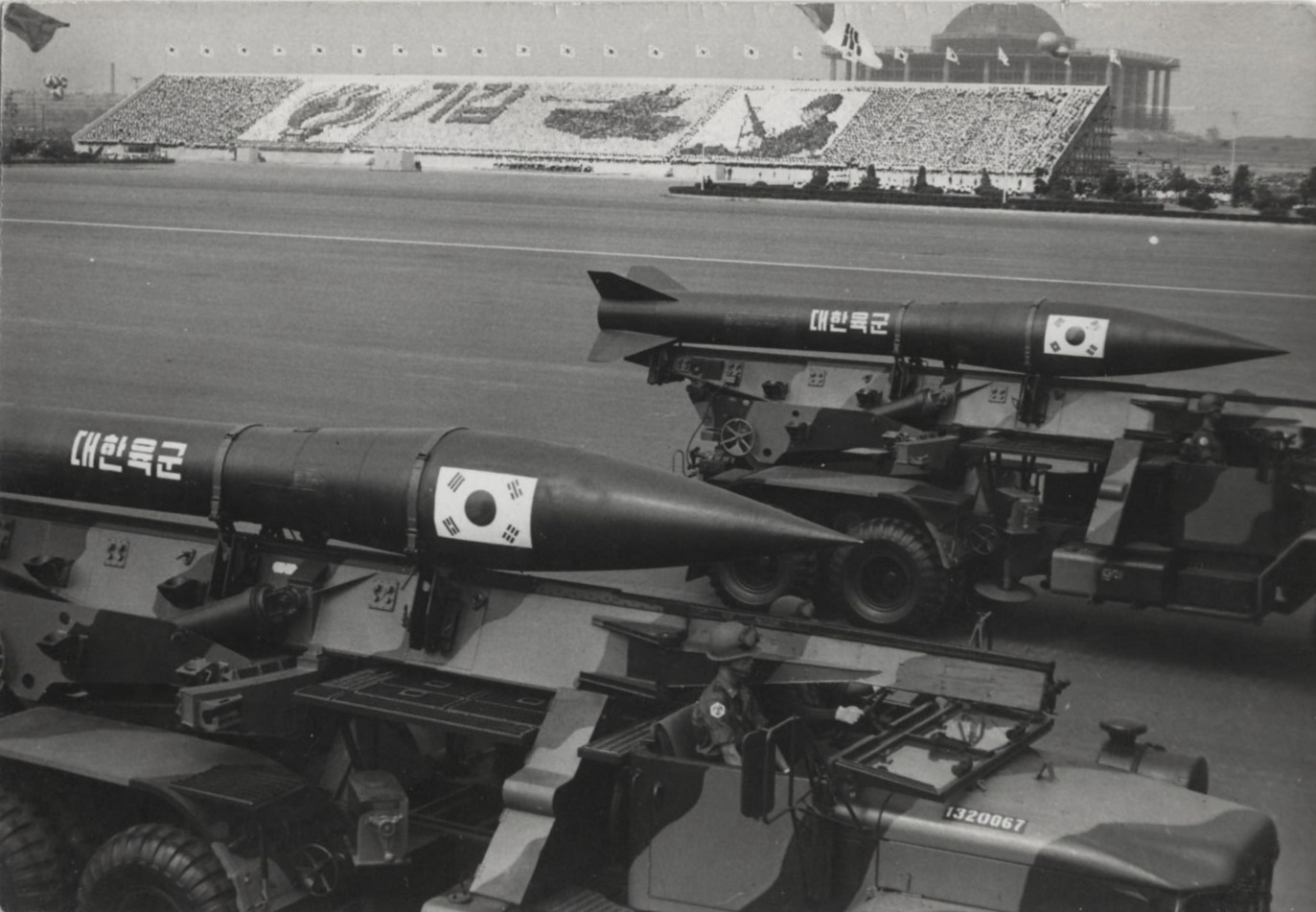
South Korean Armed Forces day in 1973

=== Former operators ===
Belgium

- Belgian Army

Used in various Corps and Divisional artillery units (75, 3, 20 and 14th Artillery Battalions) from 1960 to 1978. Replaced by Lance missile.

Canada

- Canadian Army

Canada adopted the MGR-1B with the 1-kiloton W31 warhead. Four units were assigned to 1 Surface to Surface Missile Battery, Royal Canadian Artillery at Hemer, Germany under 4 CIBG. Two to four units were supplied to 2 SSM Battery at CFB Shilo in Manitoba for training. These units were formed in September 1960. 1SSM maintained very high readiness and able to deploy to firing positions quickly. Their ability to maintain camouflage kept even elite NATO special forces from locating them in exercises. 1SSM was authorized to wear the black scarf of the Congreve rocket gunners. Canada disbanded the Honest John batteries in mid-1970 without replacement.

Denmark

- Royal Danish Army

France

- French Army
  - Corps Artillery
    - 301st Artillery Group [Battalion] (1959–1970) – absorbed into 50th Artillery Regiment
      - 50th Artillery Regiment (1970–1976)
    - 302nd Artillery Group [Battalion] (1959–1970) – absorbed into 60th Artillery Regiment
      - 60th Artillery Regiment (1970–1975)
    - 303rd Artillery Group [Battalion] (1960–1970) – absorbed into 3rd Artillery Regiment
      - 3rd Artillery Regiment (1970–1973)
  - Divisional Artillery
    - 3rd Group, 32nd Artillery Regiment (1962–1974)
    - 3rd Group, 68th Artillery Regiment (1960–1973)
  - Nuclear Security
    - 351st Artillery Group (1962–1970) – expanded to 351st Artillery Regiment
      - 351st Artillery Regiment (1970–1975)

Germany

- German Army

Greece

- Hellenic Army

Italy

- Italian Army

South Korea

- Republic of Korea Army

Norway

- Norwegian Army (1961–1965)

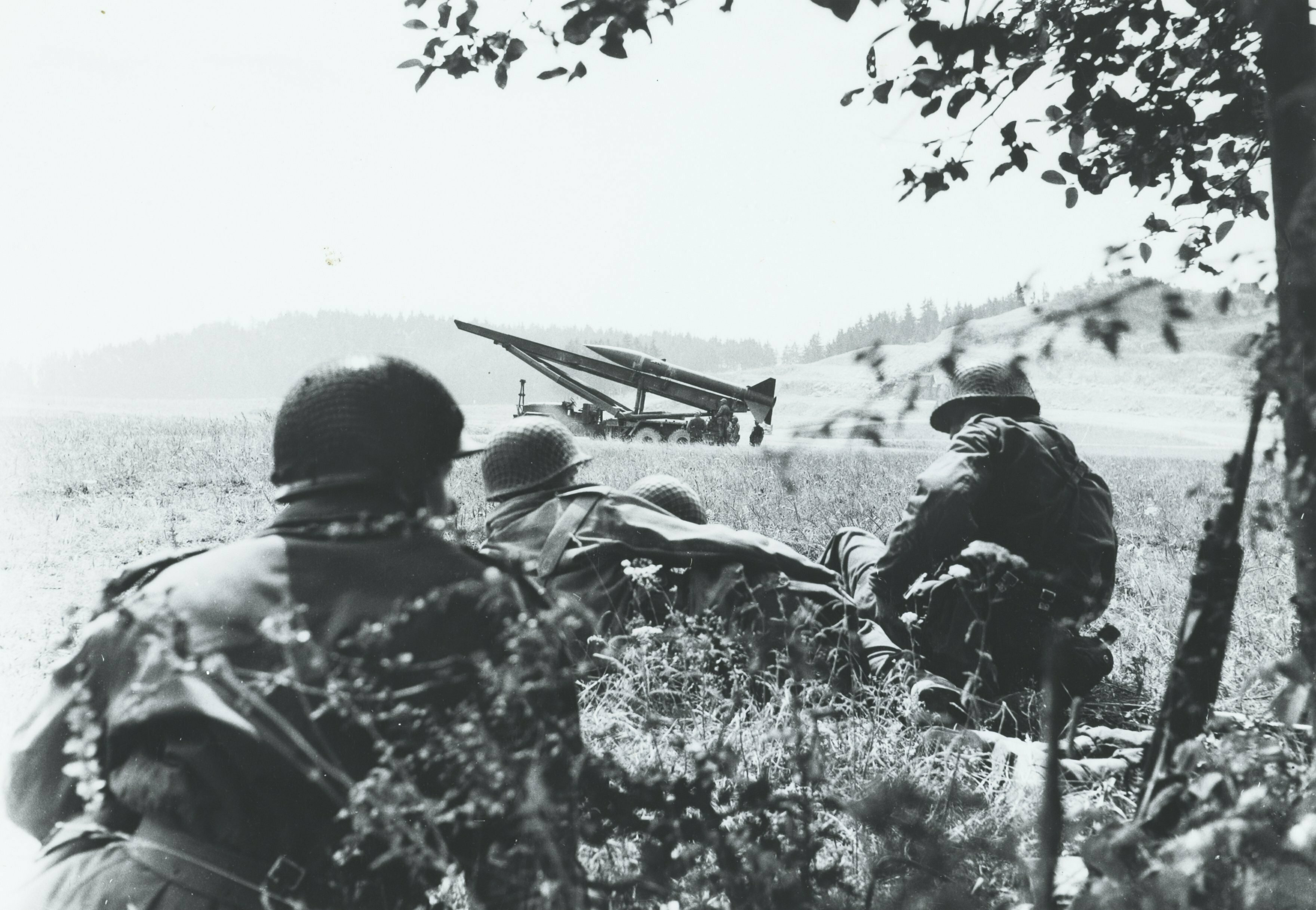
Dutch soldiers take cover and await the launch of an Honest John rocket in 1960.

Netherlands

- Royal Netherlands Army

Taiwan

- Republic of China Army

Turkey

- Turkish Army – in service with 420th, 450th, 490th, and 550th Battalions, 1963.

United Kingdom

- British Army – 24 Missile Regiment RA 1960/61 – 1977; 39 Missile Regiment RA; 50 Missile Regiment Royal Artillery, both 8 inch towed, two batteries, and two batteries Honest John.

United States

- United States Army
- United States Marine Corps

== See also ==
- W7
- W31
- M139 bomblet
- G-numbers
- MGR-3 Little John

== Models ==
Meccano Ltd. U.K. in its Dinky Toys range produced a model of the International Harvester Honest John missile launcher under the reference 665.
