= M43 BZ cluster bomb =

American chemical cluster bomb

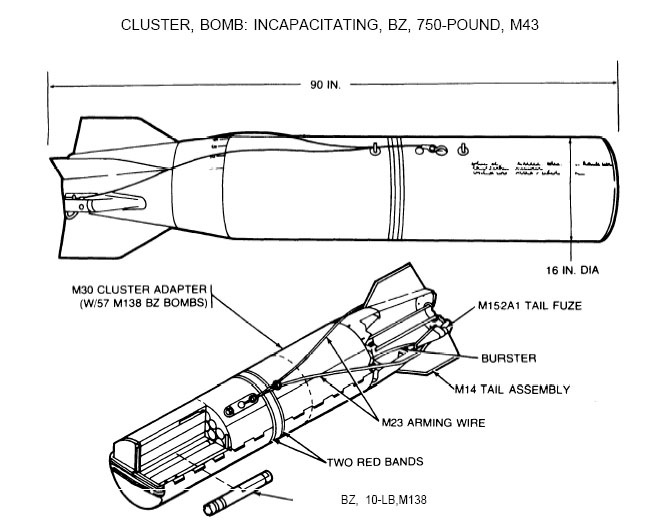
This Army illustration shows the exterior and interior of the M43

The M43 BZ cluster bomb, or simply M43 cluster bomb, was a U.S. chemical cluster bomb intended to deliver the incapacitating agent known as BZ. Each bomb was capable of covering an area of 0.11 to 0.88 ha (0.27 to 2.17 acres) with BZ agent, a useful quantity to support squad or company sized elements. Its effectiveness was hindered by limitations of the BZ agent which was easily visible and could be countered by a few layers of cloth over the nose and mouth. The M43 was produced in the early 1960s and nearly all stocks of U.S. BZ were destroyed by 1989.

== History ==
The United States Army re-evaluated its chemical and biological weapons programs in 1961. This re-evaluation led to a renewed focus on an incapacitating agent program. A project was established to begin producing BZ munitions; one result was the mass production of the Chemical Corps' M43 BZ cluster bomb in March 1962. Though M43s and another BZ weapon, the M44 generator cluster, were produced, they were never really considered an integral part of the U.S. chemical arsenal. In the end around 1,500 BZ munitions were produced between the M43 and the M44.

== Specifications ==
The 750-pound (340 kg) M43 BZ cluster bomb had a 16-inch (41 cm) diameter and a 66-inch (170 cm) length. This cluster bomb was designed to hold three stacks of 19 M138 bomblets. The bomblets each held about 6 ounces (170 g) of the incapacitating agent BZ, also known as 3-Quinuclidinyl benzilate. The M43 was meant to be delivered from a subsonic aircraft and used a standard cluster adapter which would have tail fairing added to adapt it for high speeds. The M43 cluster bomb was intended to cover an area of about 0.11 to 0.88 ha (0.27 to 2.17 acres) with BZ agent, which made it useful for attacking a squad or company sized element. A weapon such as the M43 would have been best used against hard, high-value intelligence targets, in hostage or prisoner rescue situations, or in any other situation where friendly forces and enemy forces occupied the same area.

If the M43 had been used in open terrain under neutral atmospheric stability it could have potentially incapacitated about 94% of the target with a fatality rate no greater than 2%. This would have been for a delayed (3 to 6 hour onset) and relatively long-term (1 to 5 days) neutralization.

== Issues ==
The M43 never rose above the status of "interim weapon" due to a number of shortcomings and issues with both the agent and the delivery system. BZ was expensive and difficult to synthesize, and this expense made large-area use of BZ impractical. Agent manufacture presented its own set of problems. BZ was susceptible to accidental ignition on the production line. The weaponization of BZ presented other problems including the agent cloud's easy visibility, and simple counter-measures (such as a few layers of cloth over the mouth and nose) could defeat it. In addition, the agent's "envelope-of-action" and rate of action were of questionable effectiveness. Between 50% and 80% of BZ casualties had to be restrained during recovery to prevent self-injury; other common symptoms during recovery were paranoia and mania. The combination of these issues made BZ weapons, the M43 and M44 generator cluster, unattractive to military planners.

== Storage and disposal programs ==
All BZ agent and munitions produced were shipped to and stored at Pine Bluff Arsenal in Arkansas. The stored BZ agent and munitions were destroyed between December 1988 and 1989, with nearly all of them being destroyed by mid-December 1988.

== See also ==
- M33 cluster bomb
- M34 cluster bomb
