= Lewis Army Museum =

- Red Shield Inn
- U.S. National Register of Historic Places
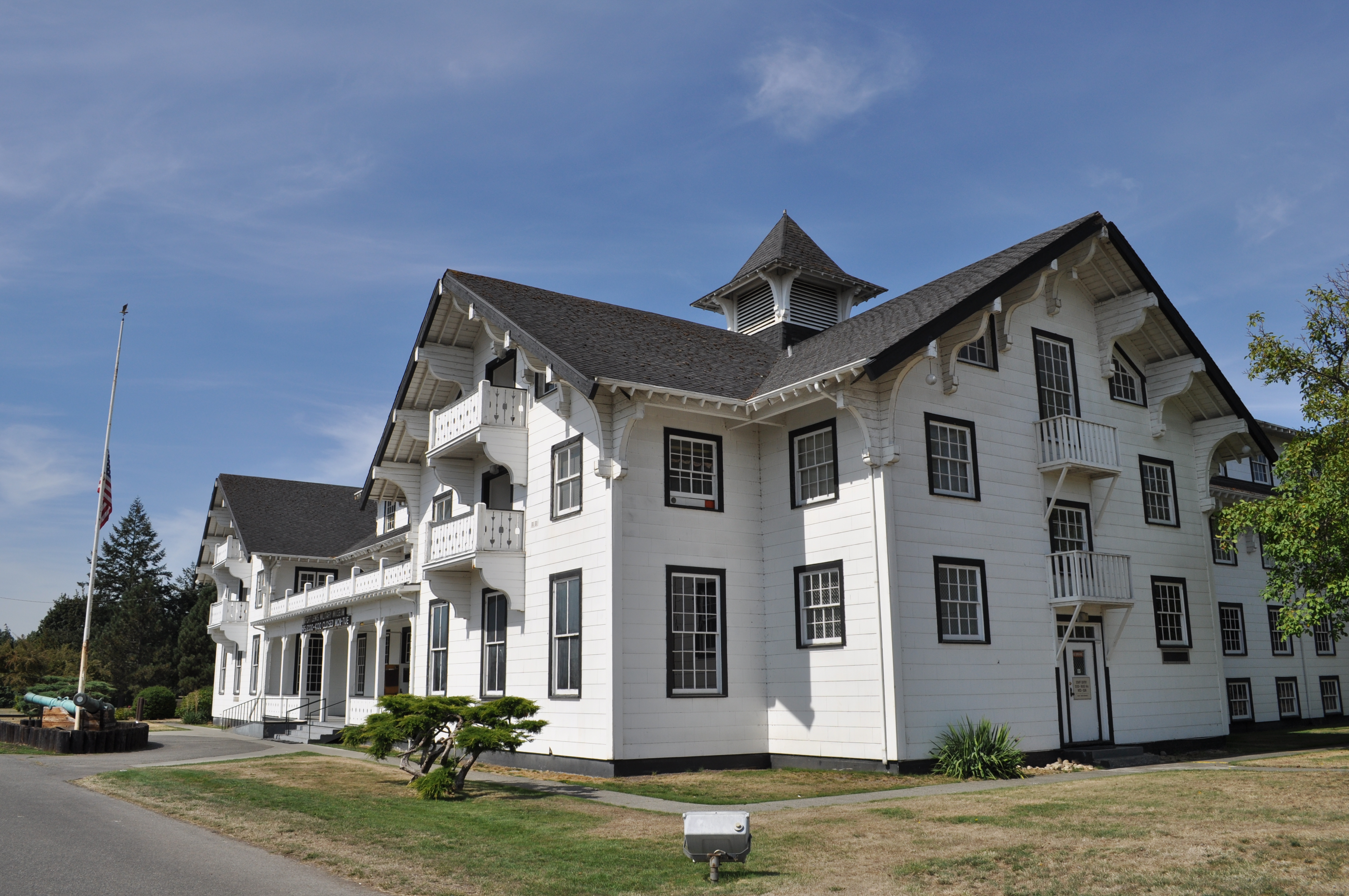
- Fort Lewis Military Museum (2009)

- Location within Washington (state)
- Location: Main St., Fort Lewis, Washington
- Coordinates: 47°5′50″N 122°36′2″W
- Area: 0.6 acres (0.24 ha)
- Built: 1919
- Architect: Pratt & Watson Construction Co.
- Architectural style: Stick/Eastlake, Western Stick
- NRHP reference No.: 79002552
- Added to NRHP: February 14, 1979

Lewis Army Museum (originally Fort Lewis Military Museum) is a military museum at Joint Base Lewis–McChord in the state of Washington, U.S. It is housed in the historic former Red Shield Inn, which is listed on the National Register of Historic Places (NRHP) and can be seen prominently from Interstate 5. It is the only certified U.S. Army museum on the West Coast.

== History ==
Established in 1971, the museum was originally housed in a two-story barracks. In July 1973, it was moved to the old Fort Lewis Inn. Amidst a restructuring by U.S. Army Center for Military History that prioritizes "readiness and lethality", the museum will be closing.

== Exhibits ==
Inside the museum are approximately 10,000 square feet (930 m^{2}) of interior displays of various collections of uniforms and equipment, including "Soldiers of the Northwest", I Corps, the 9th Infantry Division, the Medical Corps, and "The Army Family". Outside, on 2.5 acres (10,000 m^{2}), in the Vehicle Park, are a collection of tanks, jeeps, and other military vehicles, along with weapons, including a Nike-Hercules Missile and an Honest John rocket. The current director is Erik Flint. The museum was reopened in 2012 after a two-year renovation. The museum closed on July 2, 2016, and reopened on August 31, 2017, after renovations of the interior exhibits to include dioramas and interactive features.

== Red Shield Inn ==
The Red Shield Inn is one of two surviving Fort Lewis buildings that date back to the World War I era, when the present Fort Lewis was "Camp Lewis". It is the only remaining structure from a onetime recreational area that was called Greene Park. The building, in Western Stick–style, was built in 1918 by Pratt & Watson Construction Co. of Spokane, Washington, for the Salvation Army, at a cost of $107,000. It was named the Red Shield Inn, based on the Salvation Army symbol. It was 47,966 square feet (4,456.2 m^{2}) in size and had approximately 150 rooms. The Salvation Army sold it to the U.S. Army on July 21, 1921, for the nominal price of one dollar. It was briefly known as the Camp Lewis Apartments, then the Camp Lewis Inn, and from 1927 the Fort Lewis Inn. In August 1972, after the new Fort Lewis Lodge opened near the Main Post Headquarters, the building was preserved to become the new home for the fort's museum. The inn officially became the Fort Lewis Military Museum on July 18, 1973. It gained its NRHP listing in February 1979.

== Gallery ==
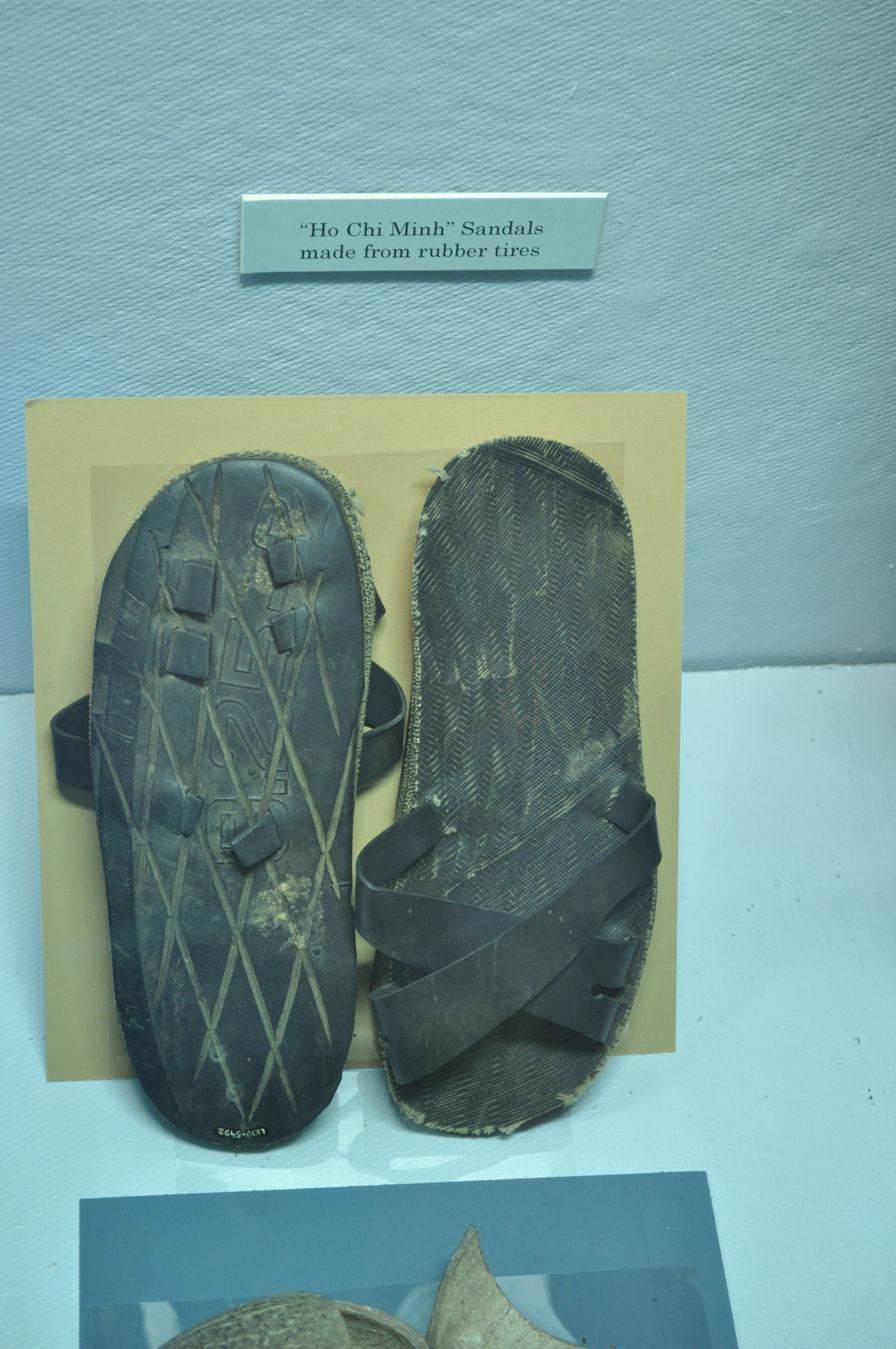
Vietnamese sandals made from recycled tire treads

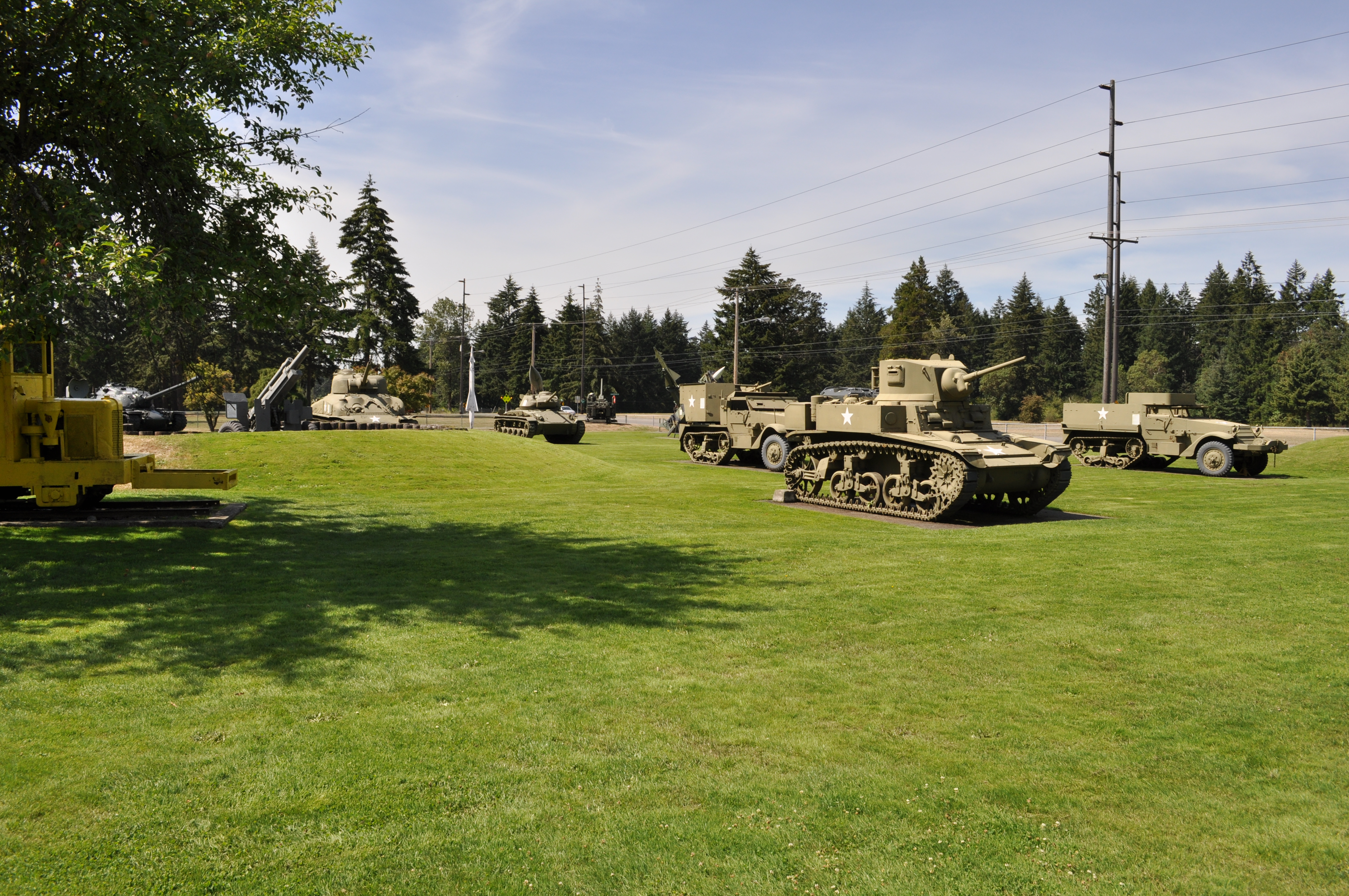
Fort Lewis Military Museum

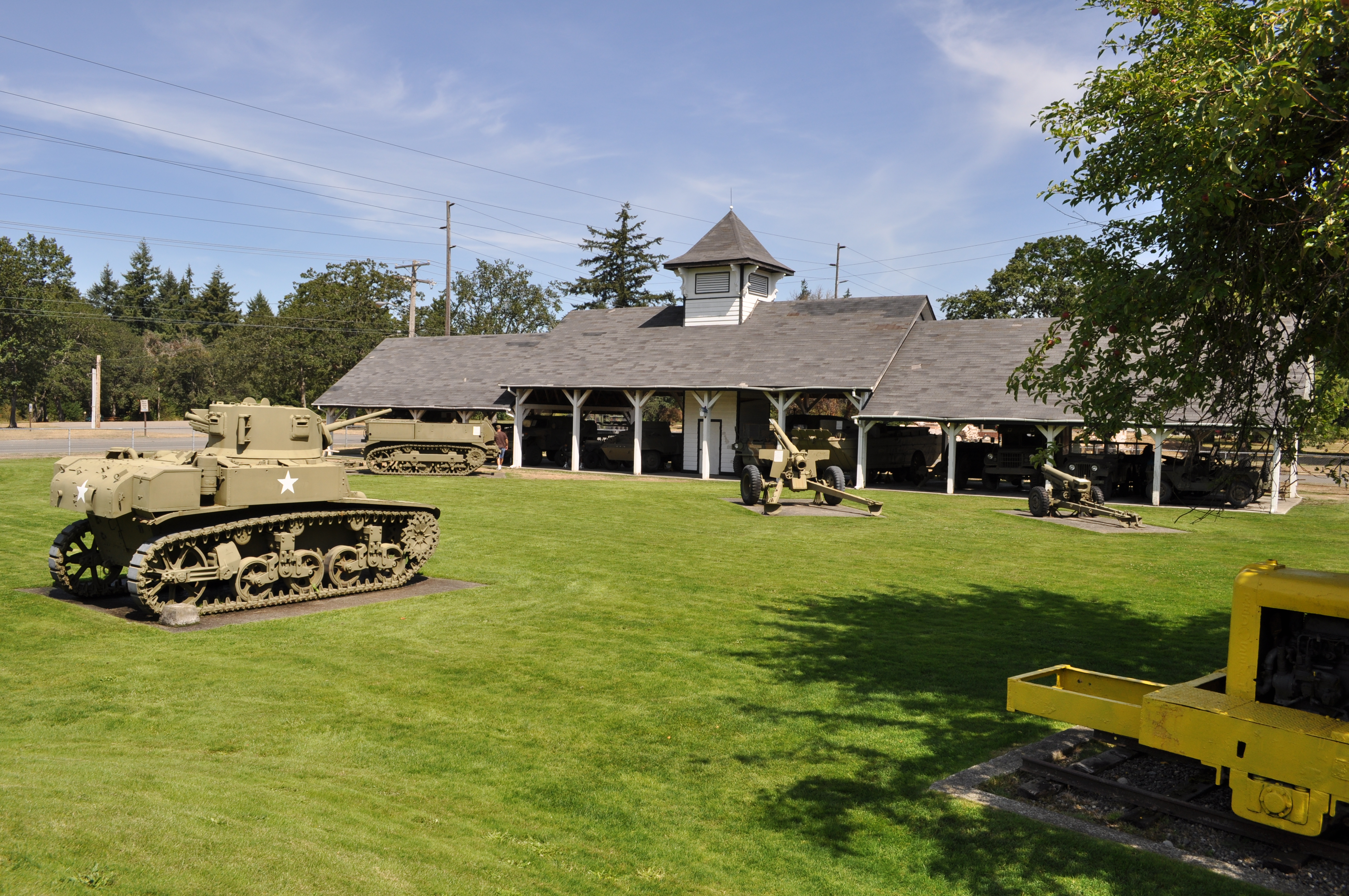
Outdoor display

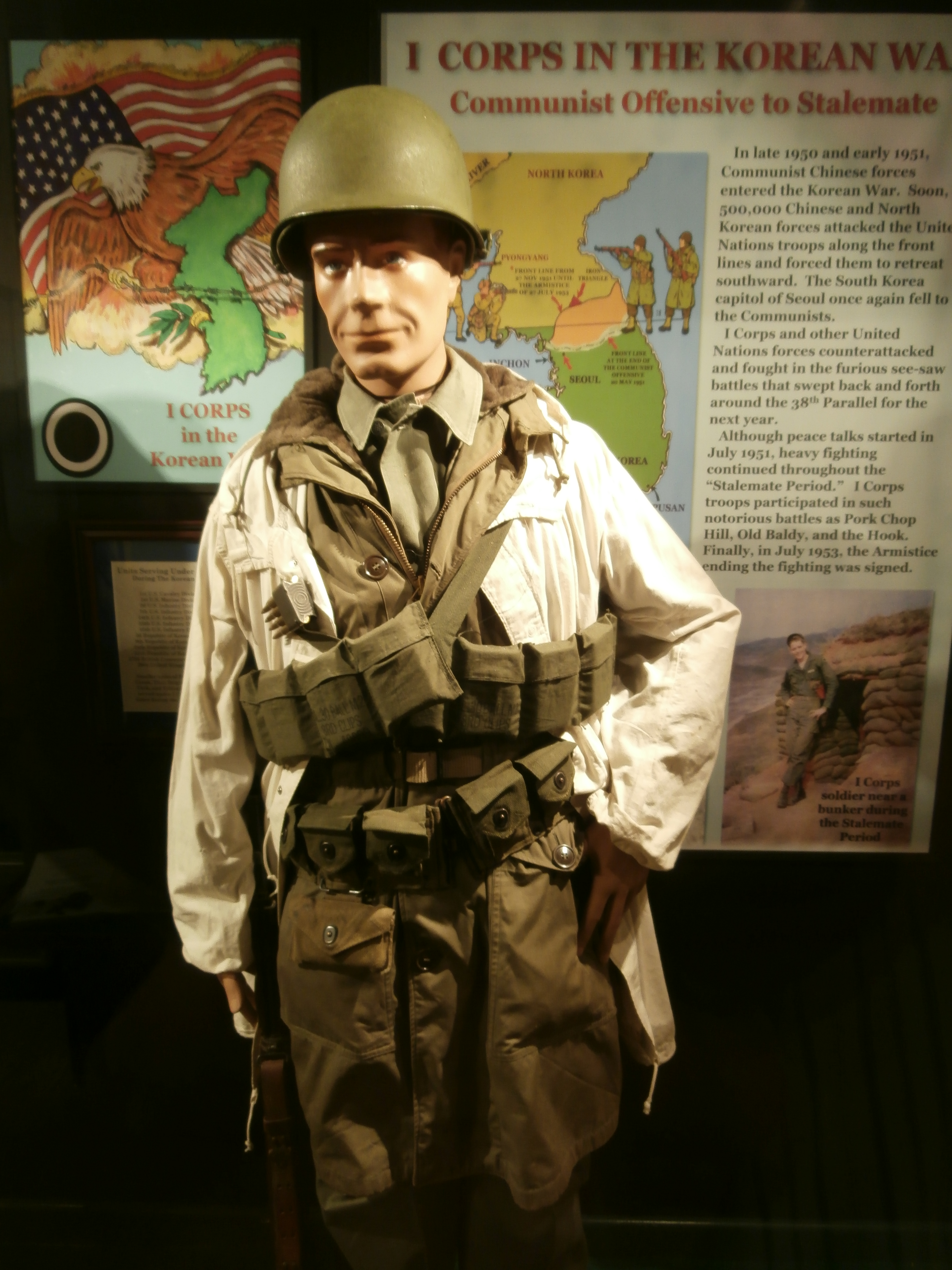
Winter uniform of Korean War U.S. Infantryman

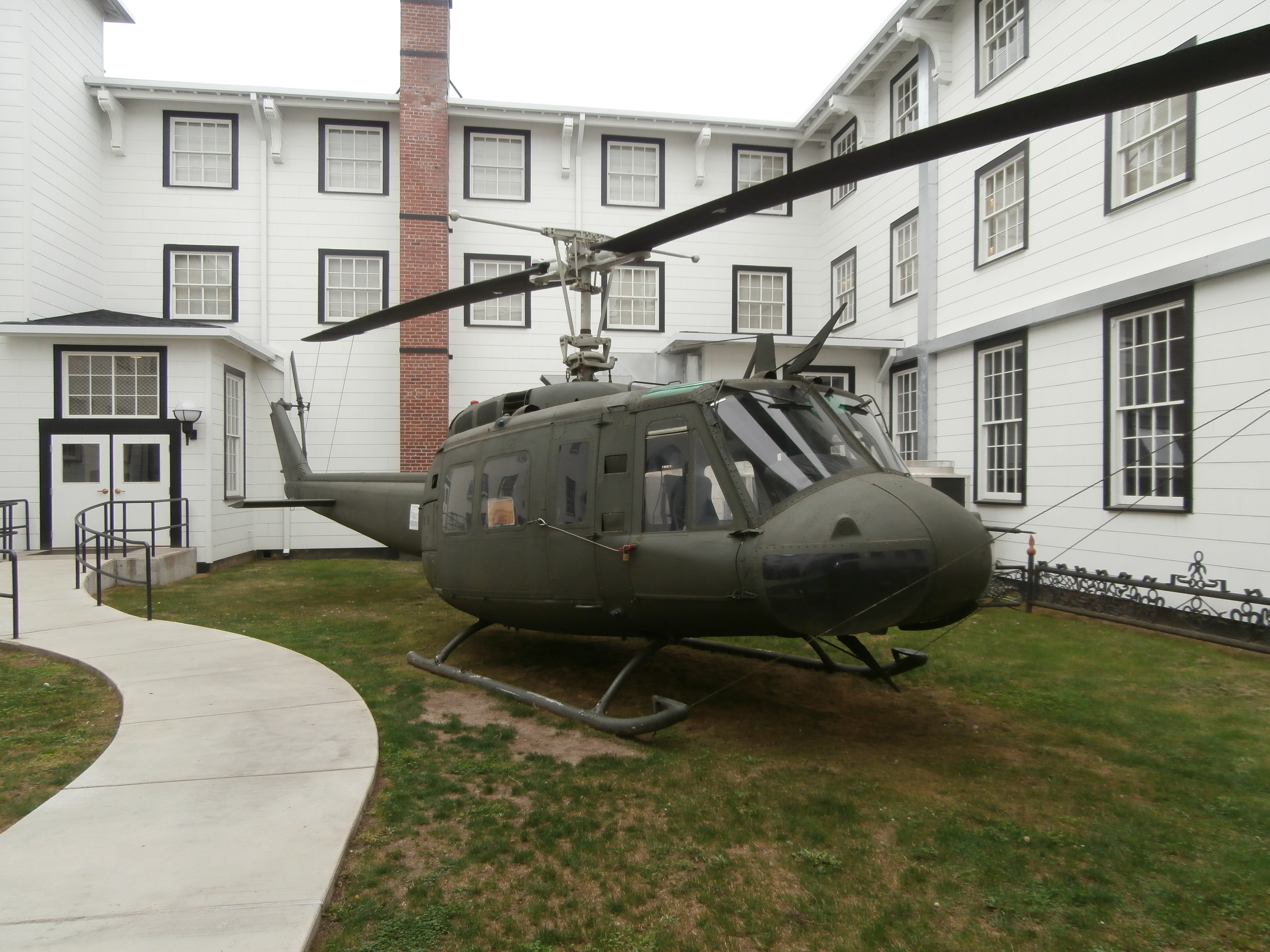
Huey Helicopter in courtyard

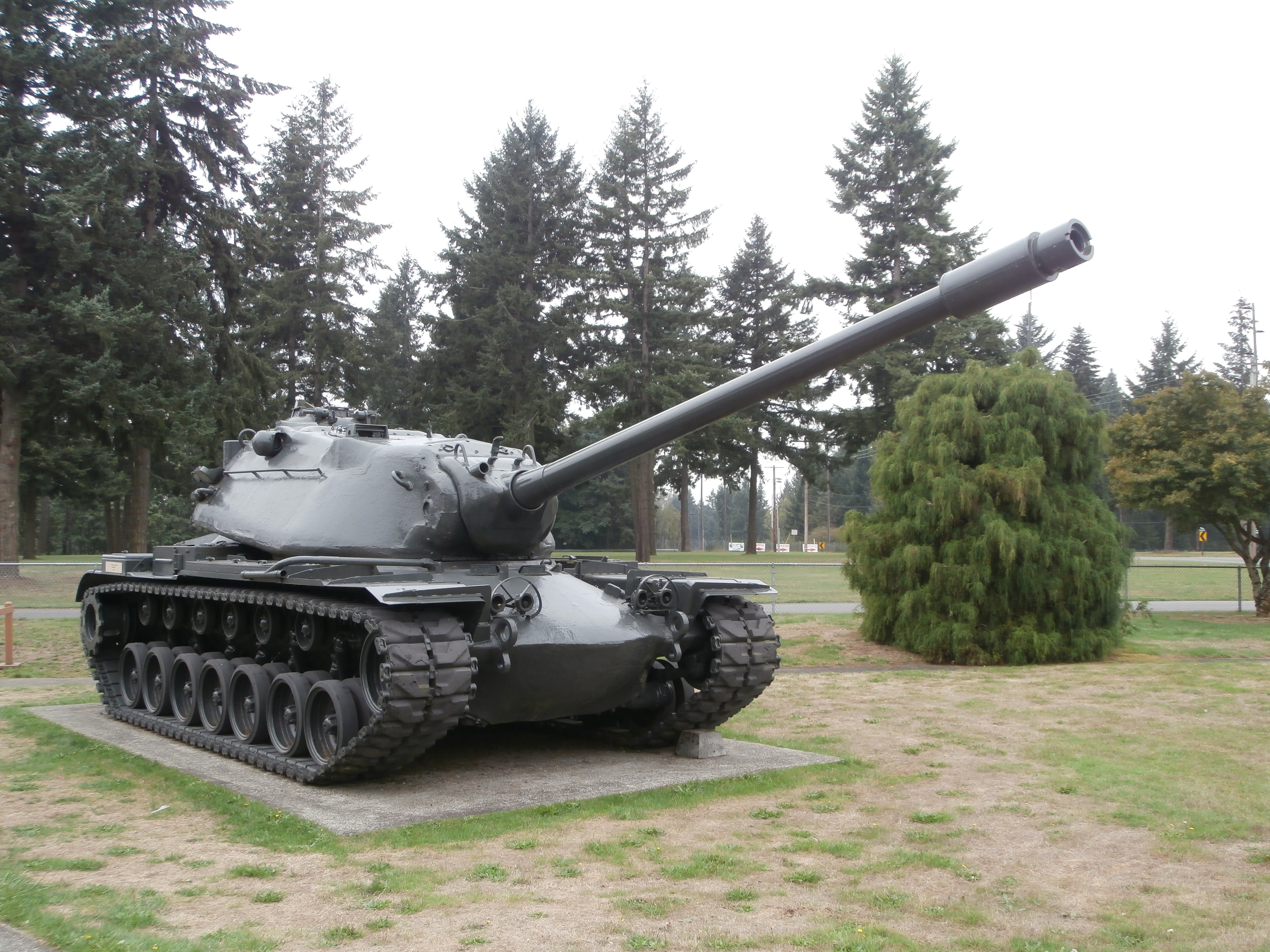
U.S. M103 Heavy Tank
