= M138 bomblet =

The M138 bomblet was a sub-munition of the U.S. chemical weapon, the M43 BZ cluster bomb. The bomblet contained BZ, an incapacitating agent and was developed with the M43 in 1962. The M138s, along with all other U.S. BZ weapons were destroyed during the 1980s.

== History ==
The U.S. Army Chemical Corps began mass-production of the chemical M43 BZ cluster bomb in March 1962. The M43 was designed to utilize the M138 bomblet. The M138, like its parent cluster bomb and all BZ munitions, were stored at Pine Bluff Arsenal in Arkansas. Between 1988 and 1989 all U.S. BZ munitions, including the M138 bomblets were demilitarized and destroyed.

== Specifications ==
The M138 bomblet had the largest continuous diameter of any chemical bomblet in the U.S. arsenal, a full 72 millimeters (mm). The M138 also possessed the thickest steel walls of U.S. bomblets, about 3 mm. The M43 cluster bomb was designed to hold 57 M138s, arranged in three stacks of 19 bomblets. Each bomblet held about 6 ounces (170 g) of the incapacitating agent BZ, also known as 3-Quinuclidinyl benzilate. The bomblets themselves were composed of M7 canisters which held a 50/50 mixture of pyrotechnic and agent (pyromix).

Each bomblet was a thin-walled cylinder that held an M150A2 "all-ways" acting impact fuze with an M308 delay element. The M138 became armed immediately upon separating from the M43 cluster bomb and its M30 cluster adapter. When the bomblet impacted the ground it ignited the fuze, and, after a short delay, the pyromix was ignited.

== Tests involving the M138 ==
The M138 was the subject of various tests, including those to determine its effectiveness and its detonability as demilitarization plans for BZ weapons ramped up during the 1980s. Tests undertaken at Pine Bluff Arsenal in 1981 showed that the M138 was a non-detonable item. Because of these test results it was determined that any demilitarization plant need not include provisions for the containment of accidental detonation of the M138. Regardless, an Army report issued on the results of the testing emphasized that extreme care must be exercised in order to prevent accidental detonation of the M138 bomblets as they were destroyed.

Other testing of the M138 was carried out by the U.S. Army's Deseret Test Center under the auspices of Project 112. These tests, known collectively as "Tall Timber" were carried out from April through June 1966 at the Waiakea Forest Reserve near Hilo, Hawaii. The purpose of the Tall Timber tests was to determine the effectiveness of BZ-filled M138 bomblets in a tropical forest environment. The tests used statically ignited M138 bomblets containing live BZ incapacitating agent.

== See also ==
- M114 bomb
- M139 bomblet
