= M134 bomblet =

American chemical sub-munition for rockets

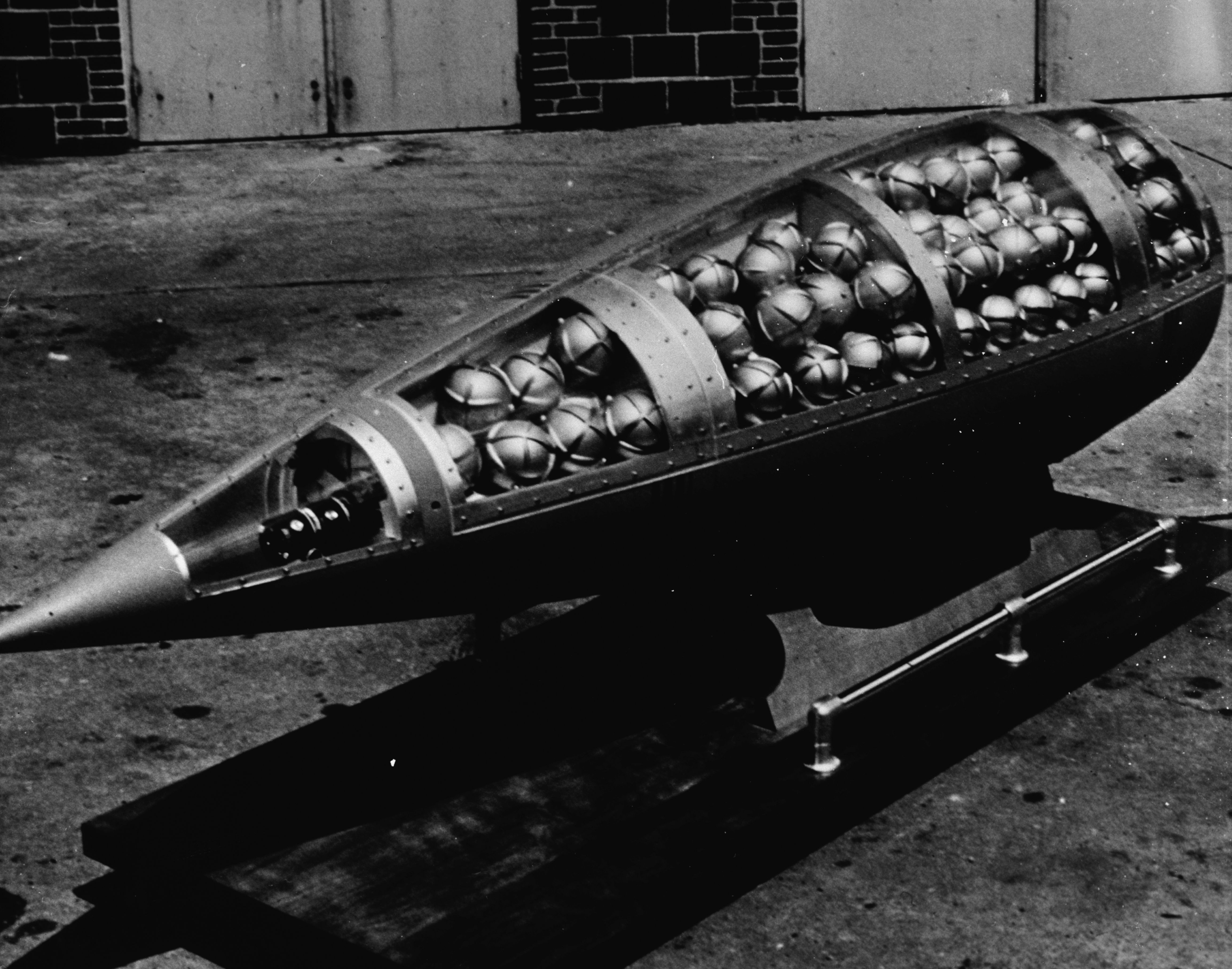
A demonstration Honest John warhead showing M134 bomblets

The M134 bomblet was a U.S. chemical cluster munition designed for use in the MGR-1 Honest John rocket during the 1950s. The weapon was never mass-produced and was supplanted in 1964 by an improved design, the M139.

== History ==
The M134 bomblet, developed as the E130, or E130R1 bomblet, began development in the early 1950s. While the weapon was not yet battle-ready, or ready for mass-production, in 1960, work on the bomblet dated back to at least 1953. By 1964 the bomblet design had been improved and the smaller M139 was adapted for use with the rocket warheads utilized by the M134. Thus, the M134 was never mass-produced; by the time the missile warhead and the M134 were ready for production they had been supplanted.

== Specifications ==
The M134 bomblet was designed for the M190 Honest John rocket warhead. The bomblets carried the nerve agent sarin and after the missile was fired the bomblets were released 5,000 feet (1,500 m) above their target. At the time of the sub-munitions' release a mechanical time fuze would cut the warhead's skin and the bomblets were released. The weapon could effectively saturate an area 3,300 feet (1,000 m) in diameter with chemical agent.

The Honest John held 356 of the 115 mm M134s. The spherical M134 was 4.5 inches around and constructed of ribbed steel. Its interior held about 1.1 pounds (0.50 kg) of sarin (GB). The U.S. Army Chemical Corps originally planned to use the M134 as a VX dispersement method also, but later regarded this use as ineffective and scrapped the plan.

== Issues ==
The warhead meant to carry the M134 was classified and went into production on April 14, 1960; the M134, however, was not yet ready for production. The M134 had a host of issues which impeded its development. Problems with the fuze system, and a tendency toward unacceptable pressure build-up in filled munitions were among the problems encountered during development. The problems with the M134 delayed the rocket-delivered nerve agent program. By 1964 the successor M139 bomblet was ready for production. The M139 was superior to the M134: its glide angle of 22° allowed it better agent coverage.

== See also ==
- M139 bomblet
- M143 bomblet
