= M139 bomblet =

Chemical cluster munition

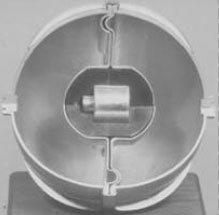
A view of the interior of an M139 bomblet.

The M139 bomblet was an American sub-munition designed for use in warheads as a chemical cluster munition. Each spherical bomblet held 1.3 pounds (590 g) of sarin nerve agent.

== History ==
A spherical chemical cluster munition, the M134, had been developed for the Honest John rocket but not deployed, owing to a variety of problems.

In 1964, a new warhead size was standardized for the smaller, 12.5-inch (320 mm) diameter, Little John rocket. The warhead held 52 M139 bomblets. (Note: The M139 bomblet was the same size as the preceding M134.) When the MGM-29 Sergeant was deployed in the 1960s, it had the capacity to deliver a warhead carrying 330 M139 bomblets. In total, about 60,000 M139s were produced and stored; almost all were destroyed between April and November 1976.

== Specifications ==
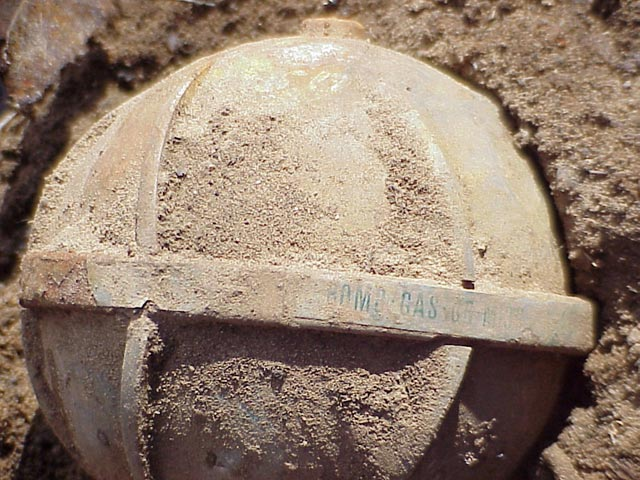
M139 bomblet discovered during cleanup at Rocky Mountain Arsenal.

The M139 was a 4.5-inch (11 cm) spherical bomblet that was filled with 1.3 pounds (590 g) of sarin (GB). On the outside of the device were "vanes"; the vanes created a spin which armed the impact fuze. This "spin-to-arm" type fuze required between 1,000 and 2,000 rotations per minute to arm, which made handling the bomblets simpler because they were insensitive to normal movements. The bomblet's interior contained a central explosive burster charge, containing 0.16 pounds (73 g) of composition B, and two outer compartments which contained the sarin.

== Tests involving the M139 ==
The M139 bomblet was used by the U.S. Army in at least two instances of chemical weapons testing. In 1967 there were two series of tests which sought to learn the effects of sarin dropped in the bomblets over two different types of forest environment. The first series of tests, known as Green Mist, took place March 25–April 24, 1967. Conducted in Hawaii, the purpose of the tests was to ascertain the effect of sarin-filled M139s being dropped and disseminated over a canopy of rain forest. The Hawaii tests used both sarin nerve agent and the simulant methyl acetoacetate.

Another test using the M139 took place at the Gerstle River test site, near Fort Greely, Alaska, from June to July 1967. The purpose of these tests was to determine the effectiveness of sarin-filled M139 and BLU-19/B23 bomblets when dropped from a SADEYE dispenser in a summer forest environment. The tests were collectively known as "Dew Point". Both 1967 testing operations were overseen by the U.S. Army's Deseret Test Center. Both M139 tests were part of Project 112.

== See also ==
- M143 bomblet, a biological weapon analogue to the M139
