= M125 bomblet =

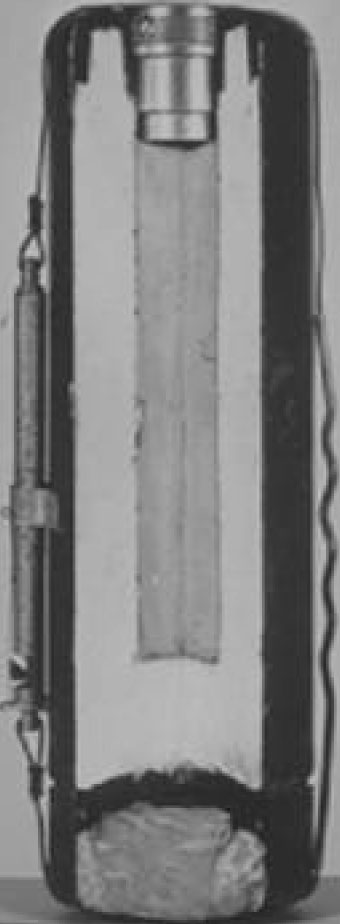
The cylindrical M125 carried 2.6 pounds (1.2 kg) of sarin nerve agent.

The M125 bomblet was a U.S. chemical sub-munition designed to deliver the nerve agent sarin. It was brought into service in 1954 with the M34 cluster bomb as part of the first U.S. air-delivered nerve agent weapon.

== History ==
The M125 bomblet was a sub-munition of the M34 cluster bomb, which was first brought into regular service by the United States Army in 1954. In development the M125 was known as the E54R6 bomblet (shortened to E54). The M34 and its payload of M125s was the first air-delivered nerve agent weapon in the U.S. chemical arsenal. Later, the Chemical Corps developed chemical-biological warheads for multiple missile systems including, Matador, Rascal, Snark, and Navaho missiles. These warheads incorporated the M125 bomblet and the M114 bomblet. Over 21,000 of the M125 containing M34 bombs were destroyed at Rocky Mountain Arsenal in 1976.

== Specifications ==
The M34 was designed to hold 76 M125 bomblets, arranged in four groups of 19. Each bomblet held 2.6 pounds (1.2 kg) of the nerve agent sarin, and 8.8 ounces (250 g) of the explosive tetryl. The ten pound cylindrical M125 bomblet also held an opening delay, fuze and parachute, as well as a burster, which contained the explosive. A M34 cluster bomb, fully loaded with M125 bomblets, had an agent weight to weapon weight ratio of 17 percent; the M34 and M125 were not the best delivery system. Eventually, cylindrical chemical bomblets, such as the M125, were supplanted by spherical models because they could obtain a greater coverage area.
