= M34 cluster bomb =

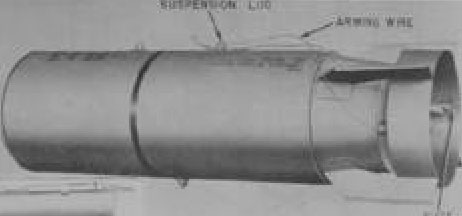
The M34 cluster bomb was the first major nerve agent weapon in the U.S. arsenal.

The M34 cluster bomb was the first mass-produced United States Army weapon meant to deliver the chemical agent sarin (GB). A large stockpile of M34s was destroyed between 1973 and 1976.

== History ==
As the United States Army Chemical Corps focused its efforts on the weaponization of sarin nerve agent (GB) during the 1950s the M34 cluster bomb was the first such weapon mass-produced by the Army. The weapon was the United States' first major nerve agent weapon after World War II.

== Specifications ==
The M34 had a diameter of 14 inches (36 cm) and a length of 86 inches (218 cm). This particular cluster bomb was designed to carry a total weight of 108 pounds (49 kg) of sarin nerve agent, the weapon's total weight was 525 pounds (238 kg). The M34 cluster bomb held 76 M125 bomblet sub-munitions, each of the sub-munitions held 2.6 pounds (1.2 kg) of GB. The weapons also contained a parachute, an opening delay, fuze, and a burster which held 8.8 ounces (250 g) of tetryl.

== Storage and disposal programs ==
When Operation Cut Holes and Sink 'Em (CHASE) was cancelled the Army had to scrap a plan to dump more than 20,000 M34 cluster bombs at sea. In 1972 there were still more than 21,000 M34 cluster munitions stored at the Rocky Mountain Arsenal, near Denver, Colorado. Between 1973 and 1976 the Army began destroying these munitions under the auspices of Project Eagle. To dispose of the munitions the Army drained the Sarin from the bomblets, mixed it with a caustic inside a reactor chamber, and spray-dried the brine. Project Eagle resulted in the demilitarization and destruction of about 450,000 U.S. gallons (1,700,000 L; 370,000 imp gal) of Sarin and 6.25 million pounds (2,830 t) of the spray-dried salt. The salt was stored in 18,000 steel and fiberboard drums and placed in a toxic storage site at Rocky Mountain Arsenal.

== See also ==
- M33 cluster bomb
