= Japanese war crimes =

- Part of the Second Sino-Japanese War and the Pacific War
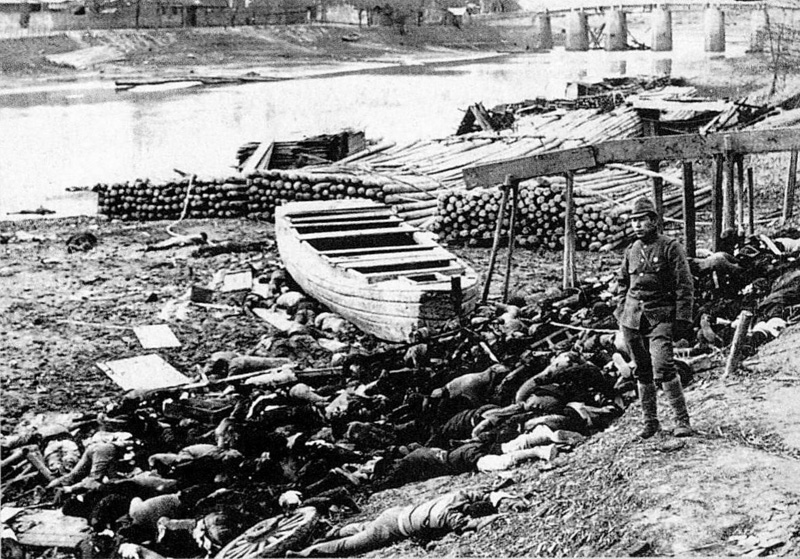
- Bodies of victims along the Qinhuai River, out of Nanjing's west gate during the Nanjing Massacre
- Location: East Asia; Southeast Asia; Pacific Ocean; Indian Ocean
- Date: 1927–1945
- Attack type: War crimes, mass murder, mass rape (genocidal rape), state terrorism, human experimentation, chemical warfare, biological warfare, ethnic cleansing, genocide, starvation, forced labour, forced assimilation, mass looting and other crimes against humanity
- Deaths: c. 19,000,000–c. 30,000,000
- Perpetrators: Empire of Japan: Imperial Japanese Armed Forces; Imperial Japanese Army; Imperial Japanese Navy
- Motive: Imperialism; Colonialism; Expansionism; Japanization; Militarism; Statism; Fascism; Ultranationalism; Racism
- Trials: Tokyo Trial, and others

Both before and during World War II, the Empire of Japan committed numerous war crimes and crimes against humanity across various Asia-Pacific nations, most notably during the Second Sino-Japanese and Pacific Wars. These crimes have been referred to as "the Asian Holocaust" or "Japan's Holocaust", as well as the "Rape of Asia". Most of these crimes occurred during the early part of the reign of Emperor Hirohito. Deaths are estimated at between 19 million and 30 million.

The Imperial Japanese Army (IJA) and the Imperial Japanese Navy (IJN) were responsible for war crimes which resulted in millions of deaths, including sexual slavery, massacres, unethical human experimentation, torture, starvation and forced labour. Evidence of these crimes, including oral testimonies and written records such as diaries and war journals, has been provided by Japanese veterans. In many instances, the Japanese political and military leadership, knowing about the atrocities committed by their own troops, continued to either condone or, in some cases, even justify them. Most of the Japanese troops who were stationed in the Asia-Pacific region either took part in or did not oppose these crimes.

The Air Service of the IJA participated in chemical and biological attacks on civilians during the Second Sino-Japanese War and World War II, violating international agreements that Japan had signed, including the Hague Conventions, which prohibited the use of "poison or poisoned weapons" in warfare.

Since the 1950s, numerous apologies for the war crimes have been issued by senior Japanese government officials, which have been criticized by some as insincere. Japan's Ministry of Foreign Affairs has acknowledged the country's role in causing "tremendous damage and suffering" before and during World War II, particularly the massacre and rape of civilians in Nanjing by the IJA. However, the issue remains controversial, with some members of the Japanese government, including former prime ministers Junichiro Koizumi and Shinzō Abe, having paid respects at the Yasukuni Shrine, which honors all Japanese war dead, including convicted Class A war criminals. Furthermore, some Japanese history textbooks provide only brief references to the war crimes, and certain members of the Japanese Liberal Democratic Party have denied some of the atrocities, such as the government's involvement in abducting women to serve as "comfort women", a euphemism for sex slaves.

== Definitions ==
The Tokyo Charter defines war crimes as "violations of the laws or customs of war," which involves acts using prohibited weapons, violating battlefield norms while engaging in combat with the enemy combatants, or against protected persons, including enemy civilians and citizens and property of neutral states as in the case of the attack on Pearl Harbor.

Military personnel from the Empire of Japan have been convicted of many such acts committed during the period of Japanese imperialism from the late 19th to mid-20th centuries. Japanese military personnel conducted a series of human rights abuses against civilians and prisoners of war throughout East Asia and the western Pacific region. These events reached their height during the Second Sino-Japanese War of 1937–45 and the Asian and Pacific campaigns of World War II (1941–45).

=== International and Japanese law ===
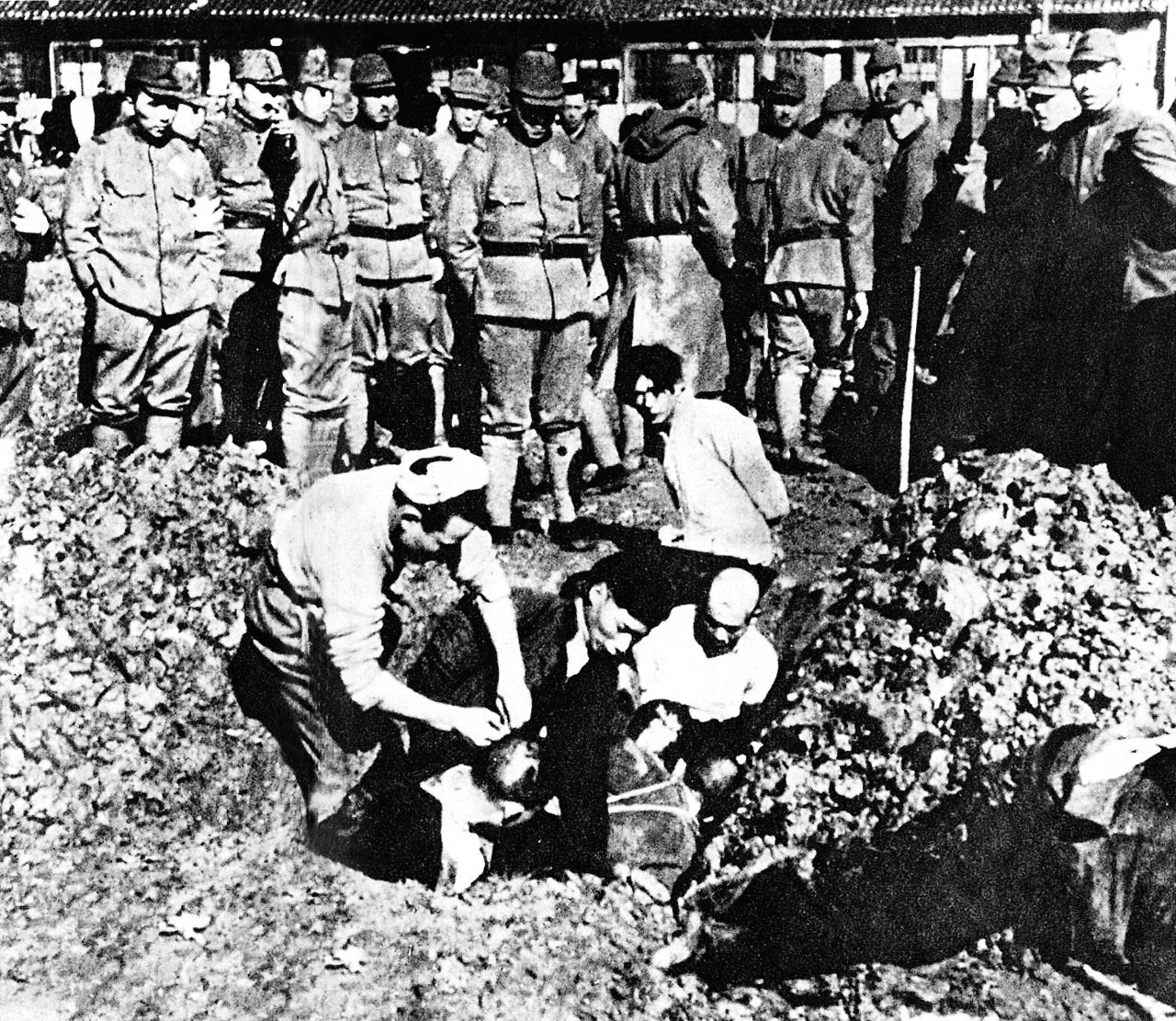
Japanese troops burying living Chinese civilians

Japan signed the 1929 Geneva Convention on the Prisoners of War and the 1929 Geneva Convention on the Sick and Wounded, but the Japanese government declined to ratify the POW Convention. In 1942, the Japanese government stated that it would abide by the terms of the Convention mutatis mutandis ('changing what has to be changed'). The crimes committed also fall under other aspects of international and Japanese law. For example, many of the crimes which were committed by Japanese personnel during World War II broke Japanese military law, and as a result the perpetrators were subject to court-martial, a requirement of that law. The Empire also violated international agreements signed by Japan, including provisions of the Hague Conventions (1899 and 1907) such as protections for prisoners of war and a ban on the use of chemical weapons, the 1930 Forced Labour Convention which prohibited forced labor, the 1921 International Convention for the Suppression of the Traffic in Women and Children which prohibited human trafficking, and other agreements.

The Japanese government also signed the Kellogg–Briand Pact (1929), thereby rendering its actions in 1937–45 liable to charges of crimes against peace, a charge that was introduced at the Tokyo Trials to prosecute "Class A" war criminals. "Class B" war criminals were those found guilty of war crimes per se, and "Class C" war criminals were those guilty of crimes against humanity. The Japanese government also accepted the terms set by the Potsdam Declaration (1945) after the end of the war, including the provision in Article 10 of punishment for "all war criminals, including those who have visited cruelties upon our prisoners". Japanese law does not define those convicted in the post-1945 trials as criminals, despite the fact that Japan's governments have accepted the judgments made in the trials, and in the Treaty of San Francisco (1952). Former Prime Minister Shinzō Abe had advocated the position that Japan accepted the Tokyo tribunal and its judgements as a condition for ending the war, but that its verdicts have no relation to domestic law. According to Abe, those convicted of war crimes are not criminals under Japanese law.

=== Historical and geographical extent ===
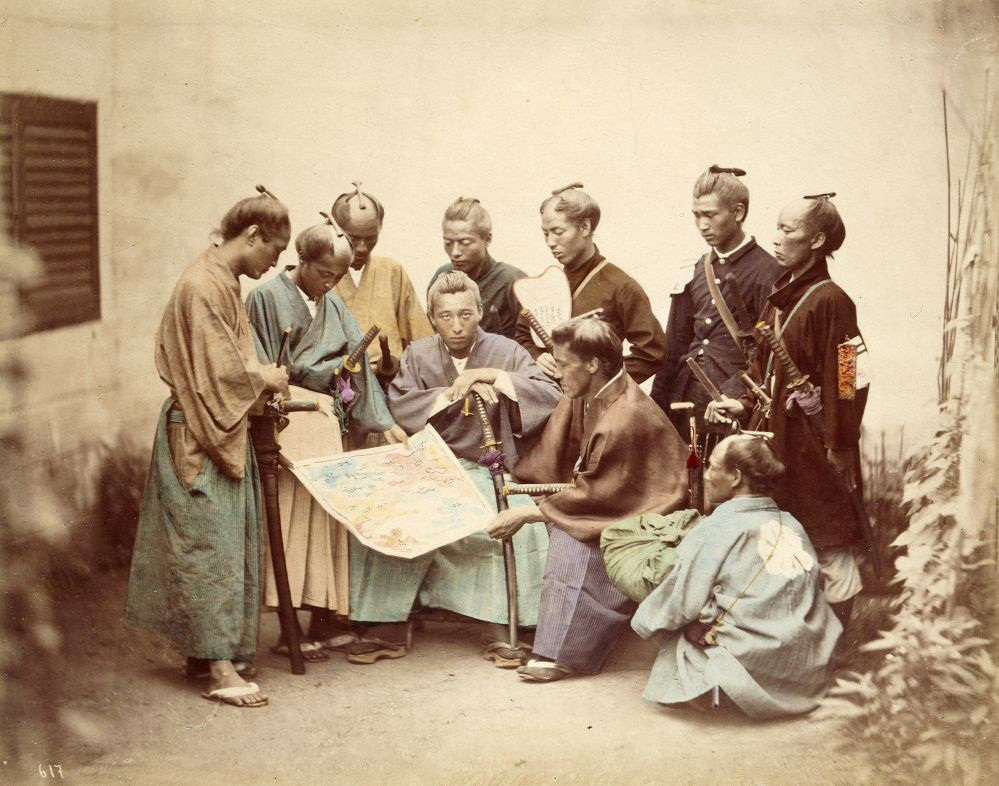
Samurai warriors of the Chosyu clan, during the Boshin War period of the 1860s

Outside Japan, different societies use widely different timeframes when they define Japanese war crimes. For example, the annexation of Korea by Japan in 1910 was enforced by the Japanese military, and the Society of Yi Dynasty Korea was controlled by the political system of the Empire of Japan. Thus, North and South Korea both refer to "Japanese war crimes" as events which occurred during the period of Korea under Japanese rule.

By contrast, the Western Allies did not come into a military conflict with Japan until 1941, and as a result, North Americans, Australians, South East Asians and Europeans may consider "Japanese war crimes" events that occurred from 1942 to 1945.

A small minority of people in every Asian and Pacific country which was invaded or occupied by Japan collaborated with the Japanese military, and they even served in it, for a wide variety of reasons, such as economic hardship, coercion, or antipathy toward other imperialist powers. In addition to Japanese civil and military personnel, Chinese (including Manchus), Koreans, and Taiwanese who were forced to serve in the military of the Empire of Japan were also found to have committed war crimes as part of the Japanese Imperial Army.

== Background ==
=== Japanese militarism and imperialism ===
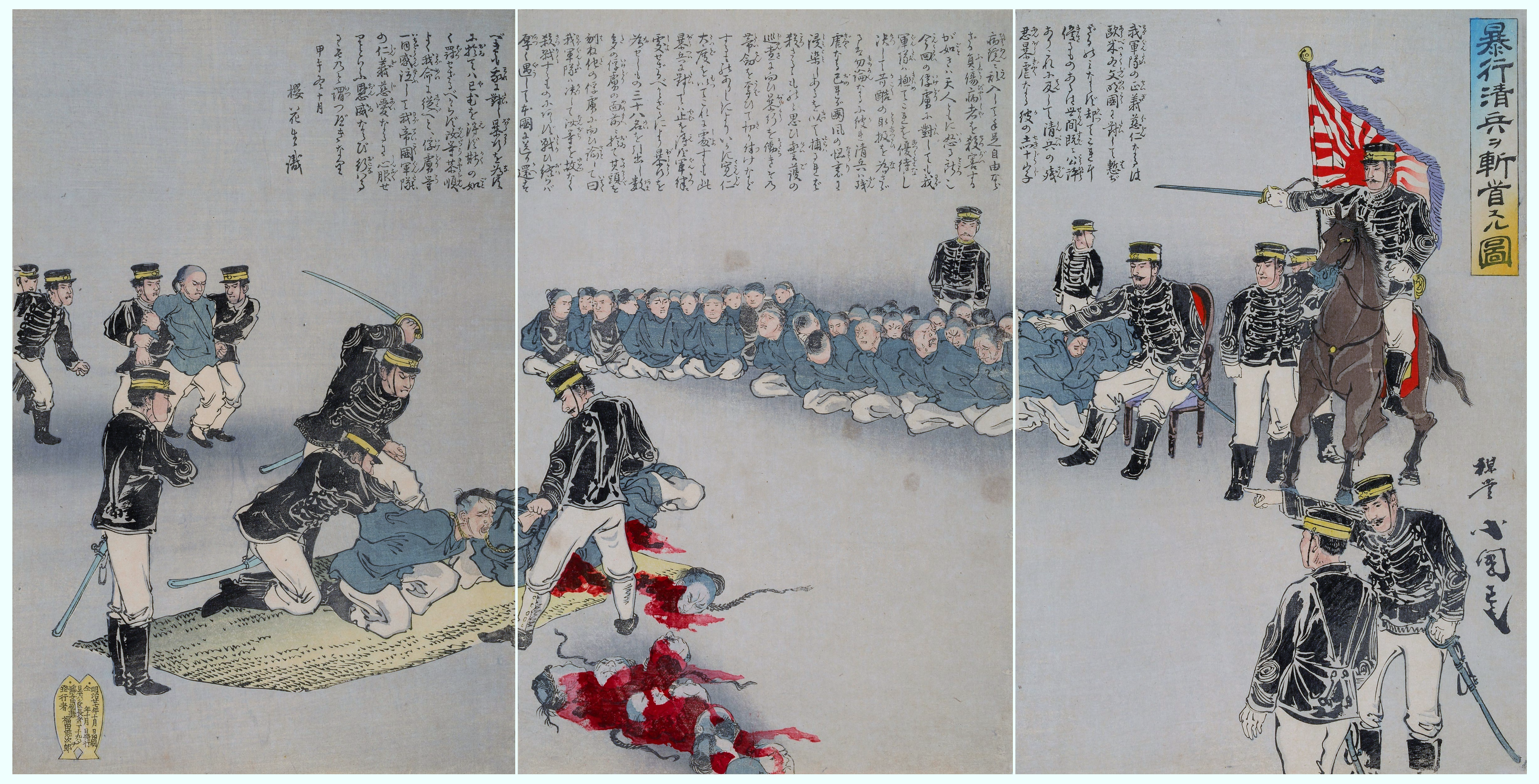
Japanese illustration depicting the beheading of Chinese captives during the Sino-Japanese War of 1894–1895

Militarism, nationalism and imperialism, especially during Imperial Japan's expansion through East Asia, had great bearings on the conduct of the Japanese armed forces both before and during the Second World War. After the Meiji Restoration and the collapse of the Tokugawa shogunate, the Emperor became the focus of military loyalty and nationalism. During the so-called "Age of Imperialism" in the late 19th century, Japan followed the lead of other world powers by establishing a colonial empire, an objective which it aggressively pursued.

Unlike many other major powers, Japan never ratified the Geneva Convention of 1929—also known as the Convention relative to the Treatment of Prisoners of War, Geneva 27 July 1929—which was the version of the Geneva Convention that covered the treatment of prisoners of war during World War II. Nevertheless, Japan ratified the Hague Conventions of 1899 and 1907 which contained provisions regarding prisoners of war and an Imperial Proclamation in 1894 stated that Japanese soldiers should make every effort to win the war without violating international laws. According to Japanese historian Yuki Tanaka, Japanese forces during the First Sino-Japanese War released 1,790 Chinese prisoners without harm, once they signed an agreement not to take up arms against Japan if they were released. After the Russo-Japanese War of 1904–1905, all of the 79,367 Russian prisoners who were held by the Japanese were released, and they were also paid for the labor which they performed during this period, in accordance with the Hague Convention. Similarly, the behavior of the Japanese military in World War I was at least as humane as that of other militaries which fought during the war, with some German Empire prisoners of the Japanese finding life in Japan so agreeable that they stayed and settled in Japan after the war.

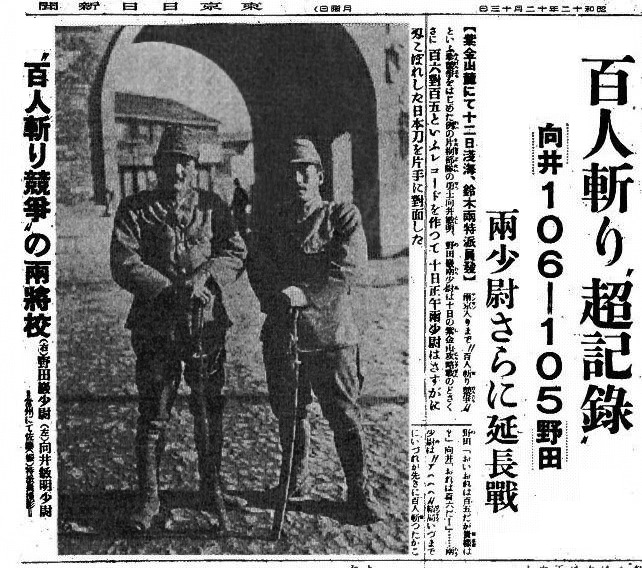
Two Japanese commanders, Toshiaki Mukai and Tsuyoshi Noda competing to see who could kill (with a sword) one hundred people first. The headline reads, "'Incredible Record' (in the Contest to Decapitate 100 People)—Mukai 106 – 105 Noda—Both 2nd Lieutenants Go Into Extra Innings".

By the late 1930s, the rise of militarism in Japan led to the creation of a wider Japanese military culture which bore at least superficial similarities to the military culture of Nazi Germany. Japan also had a military secret police force within the Imperial Japanese Army, known as the Kempeitai. In annexed and occupied countries, the Kempeitai and the Nazi Gestapo performed similar functions, although the Kempeitai had existed for nearly a decade before Adolf Hitler's birth.

Perceived failure or insufficient devotion to the Emperor would result in punishment, frequently of the physical kind. In the military, officers would assault and beat men under their command, who would pass the beating all the way down on to the lowest ranks. In POW camps, this meant that prisoners of war received the worst beatings of all, partly in the belief that such punishments were merely the proper technique to deal with disobedience.

As Japan continued its modernization in the early 20th century, her armed forces became convinced that success in battle would be assured if Japanese soldiers, sailors, and airmen had the "spirit" of Bushido. ... The result was that the Bushido code of behavior "was inculcated into the Japanese soldier as part of his basic training." Each soldier was indoctrinated to accept that it was the greatest honor to die for the Emperor and it was cowardly to surrender to the enemy. ... Bushido therefore explains why the Japanese soldiers who were stationed in the NEI so mistreated POWs in their custody. Those who had surrendered to the Japanese—regardless of how courageously or honorably they had fought—merited nothing but contempt; they had forfeited all honor and literally deserved nothing. Consequently, when the Japanese murdered POWs by shooting, beheading, and drowning, these acts were excused since they involved the killing of men who had forfeited all rights to be treated with dignity or respect. While civilian internees were certainly in a different category from POWs, it is reasonable to think that there was a "spill-over" effect from the tenets of Bushido.

— Fred Borch, Military Trials of War Criminals in the Netherlands East Indies 1946–1949

The phenomenon of gekokujō (下克上), in which lower-ranking officers overthrew or assassinated their superiors (as evidenced by the multiple coups and assassinations which were carried out on the mainland), also contributed to the proliferation of war crimes, because if commanders tried to restrict the proliferation of atrocities, they could be mutinied against or reassigned. Historians have also argued that disorganization, in addition to inadequate oversight and enforcement mechanisms (such as effective courts-martial procedures) contributed to a deterioration in discipline and a culture of impunity that facilitated the practice of war crimes, and that leaders of the Japanese army could have prevented many of these atrocities by introducing such measures.

Compared to members of the German Einsatzgruppen, who carried out mass shootings on the Eastern Front in Europe and often suffered from psychological issues, Japanese soldiers who perpetrated war crimes were reportedly less likely to display adverse psychological effects as a result. However, some sources have documented psychological issues and feelings of regret which were experienced by Japanese soldiers who participated in these massacres and war crimes, and some may have been deeply impacted as a result.

=== Events of the 1920s and 1930s ===
As Japan entered the Showa period, there was an intensification of both national, ethnic and racial nationalism, with ideologies such as Yamato nationalism and eugenics growing in popularity within the country and later becoming official government policy. In relation to other ethnicities (such as the Chinese and Koreans, for example), it is said that these ideologies, which were used by proponents of the belief in the ethnic superiority of the "Yamato race", were some of the major driving forces behind the incentivizing of further Japanese expansionism and imperialism in Asia.

During that period, propaganda which portrayed the Japanese as superior and brave, while also portraying members of other races as inferior (such as by depicting them as cowards, pigs, rats, or mice) was disseminated in woodcuts which were produced for widespread consumption. The Myrdal-Kessle woodcut cartoon collection, which was donated to the Museum of Far Eastern Antiquities in Stockholm, Sweden, was the subject of a catalogued exhibition in 2011 and includes examples of this type of material which were produced from as early as the Meiji period.

==== Domestic political repression ====
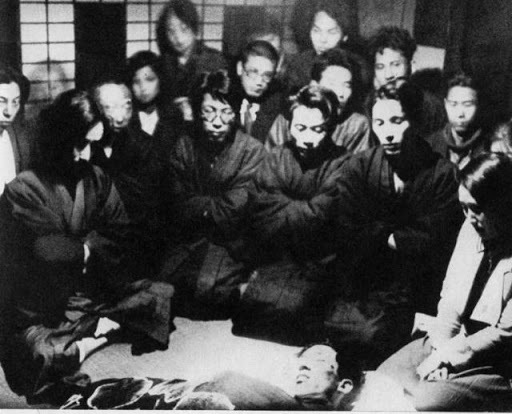
Takiji Kobayashi's corpse surrounded by his friends at the Tsukiji Police Station. It is believed that he was tortured to death during interrogation.

Andrew Roth traces the origins of Japanese military brutality towards the Allies to the Japanese government's treatment of its own political dissidents on the home islands. Both before and during the war, scores of political dissidents were imprisoned and tortured by the Special Higher Police. These dissidents were mostly communists, socialists and anarchists, who were strongly critical of Japanese militarism and imperialism.

Interrogators employed both physical and psychological torture against prisoners, with many of them being subjected to methods such as starvation, sleep deprivation and even sexual humiliation. In some instances, the torture endured by these prisoners was fatal, with the most famous example being the death of Takiji Kobayashi, a Communist writer who was killed while in police custody.

Like Germany, Japan made every effort to crush internal opposition before it embarked on the war. By the time of the Attack on Pearl Harbor, all organized dissent within Japan had been thoroughly crushed. According to Roth

The military fascists benefited greatly from the failure of Americans to realize that the internal suppression of democrats and even radicals in Japan was a vital step in the direction of external aggression against the United States and other peaceful powers. We did not realize that the torture and death of a Japanese leftist (In reference to Takiji Kobayashi) for opposing war was preliminary to a war in which American, British and Chinese prisoners of war were to be tortured and killed.

Historian Richard H. Mitchell has characterized fascist Japan as a "paternalistic police state", in which the state was considered an extended family, with the government as the parent, the people as the children, and the police as "nurses" to the children. The official policy of the state authorities by the 1930s was to "reform" political prisoners, where suspects were released on parole if they recanted their beliefs and reintegrated into society. This rationale led to apparent contradictions, such as during the detention of Takiji Kobayashi, when his interrogators paused after hours of torture to extend a "hand of benevolence" by ordering food and eating with the suspects. According to Japanese historian Maruyama Masao, such contradictions even extended to Allied prisoners of war, such that camp guards felt they were "helping" prisoners while also beating and kicking them.

== War crimes ==
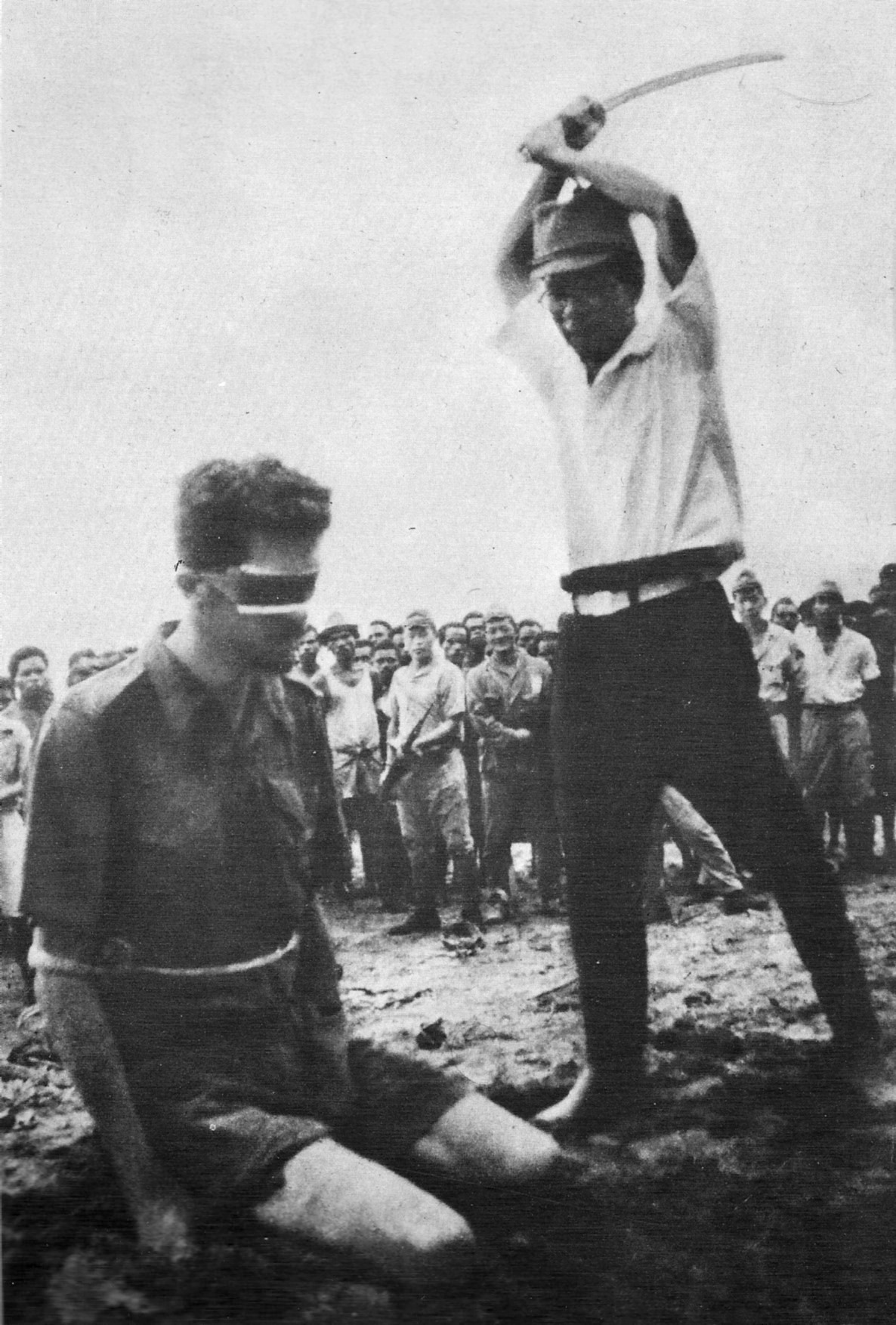
An Australian prisoner of war, Sergeant Leonard Siffleet, captured in New Guinea, about to be beheaded with a guntō by a Japanese officer, 1943.

Much of the controversy regarding Japan's role in World War II revolves around the death rates of prisoners of war and civilians under Japanese occupation. Historian Sterling Seagrave has written that:

Arriving at a probable number of Japan's war victims who died is difficult for several interesting reasons, which have to do with Western perceptions. Both Americans and Europeans fell into the unfortunate habit of seeing World War I and World War II as separate wars, failing to comprehend that they were interlaced in a multitude of ways (not merely that one was the consequence of the other, or of the rash behavior of the victors after WW1). Wholly aside from this basic misconception, most Americans think of World War II in Asia as having begun with the attack on Pearl Harbor, the British with the fall of Singapore, and so forth. The Chinese would correct this by identifying the Marco Polo Bridge incident as the start, or the earlier Japanese seizure of Manchuria. It really began in 1895 with Japan's assassination of Korea's Queen Min, and invasion of Korea, resulting in its absorption into Japan, followed quickly by Japan's seizure of southern Manchuria, etc. – establishing that Japan was at war from 1895 to 1945. Prior to 1895, Japan had only briefly invaded Korea during the Shogunate, long before the Meiji Restoration, and the invasion failed. Therefore, Rudolph Rummel's estimate of 6-million to 10-million dead between 1937 (the Rape of Nanjing) and 1945, may be roughly corollary to the time-frame of the Nazi Holocaust, but it falls far short of the actual numbers killed by the Japanese war machine. If you add, say, 2-million Koreans, 2-million Manchurians, Chinese, Russians, many East European Jews (both Sephardic and Ashkenazi), and others killed by Japan between 1895 and 1937 (conservative figures), the total of Japanese victims is more like 10-million to 14-million. Of these, I would suggest that between 6-million and 8-million were ethnic Chinese, regardless of where they were resident.

In 1943, Prince Mikasa, the younger brother of Hirohito and a member of the Imperial House of Japan, was stationed in China and served as an officer in the Imperial Japanese Army. He authored a book published in 1984, in which he revealed his shock at the atrocities carried out by the Japanese military during his one-year deployment in China. In 1994, the Japanese newspaper outlet Yomiuri Shimbun conducted an interview with him. He provided an account of the atrocities which the Japanese committed against the Chinese, and he verified the claim that he had denounced the aggression in a speech which he addressed to Japanese soldiers who were stationed in China during World War II. He discovered that military officers utilized Chinese prisoners of war for bayonet drills to bolster the resolve of Japanese soldiers. Additionally, he noted that POWs were asphyxiated and shot in large numbers while being restrained to posts. He emphasized that killing POWs in a gruesome manner constitutes a massacre, affirming without doubt that Japanese soldiers indeed committed such atrocious acts.

According to Werner Gruhl, approximately eight million Chinese civilian deaths were directly attributable to Japanese aggression.

According to the findings of the Tokyo Tribunal, the death rate among prisoners of war from Asian countries held by Japan was 27.1%. The death rate of Chinese prisoners of war were much higher because—under a directive ratified on 5 August 1937, by Emperor Hirohito—the constraints of international law on treatment of those prisoners was removed. Only 56 Chinese prisoners of war were released after the surrender of Japan. After 20 March 1943, officers of the Imperial Japanese Navy ordered and encouraged the Navy to execute all prisoners taken at sea.

According to British historian Mark Felton, "officers of the Imperial Japanese Navy ordered the deliberately sadistic murders of more than 20,000 Allied seamen and countless civilians in cold-blooded defiance of the Geneva Convention." At least 12,500 British sailors and 7,500 Australians were murdered. The Japanese Navy sank Allied merchant and Red Cross vessels, then, they murdered the survivors while they were either floating on the sea or in lifeboats. During landings, Japanese Naval personnel rounded up, raped, then massacred civilians. Some of the victims were fed to sharks, other victims were killed with sledge-hammers or bayonets, other victims were crucified, drowned, hanged, or beheaded.

=== Attacks on neutral powers ===
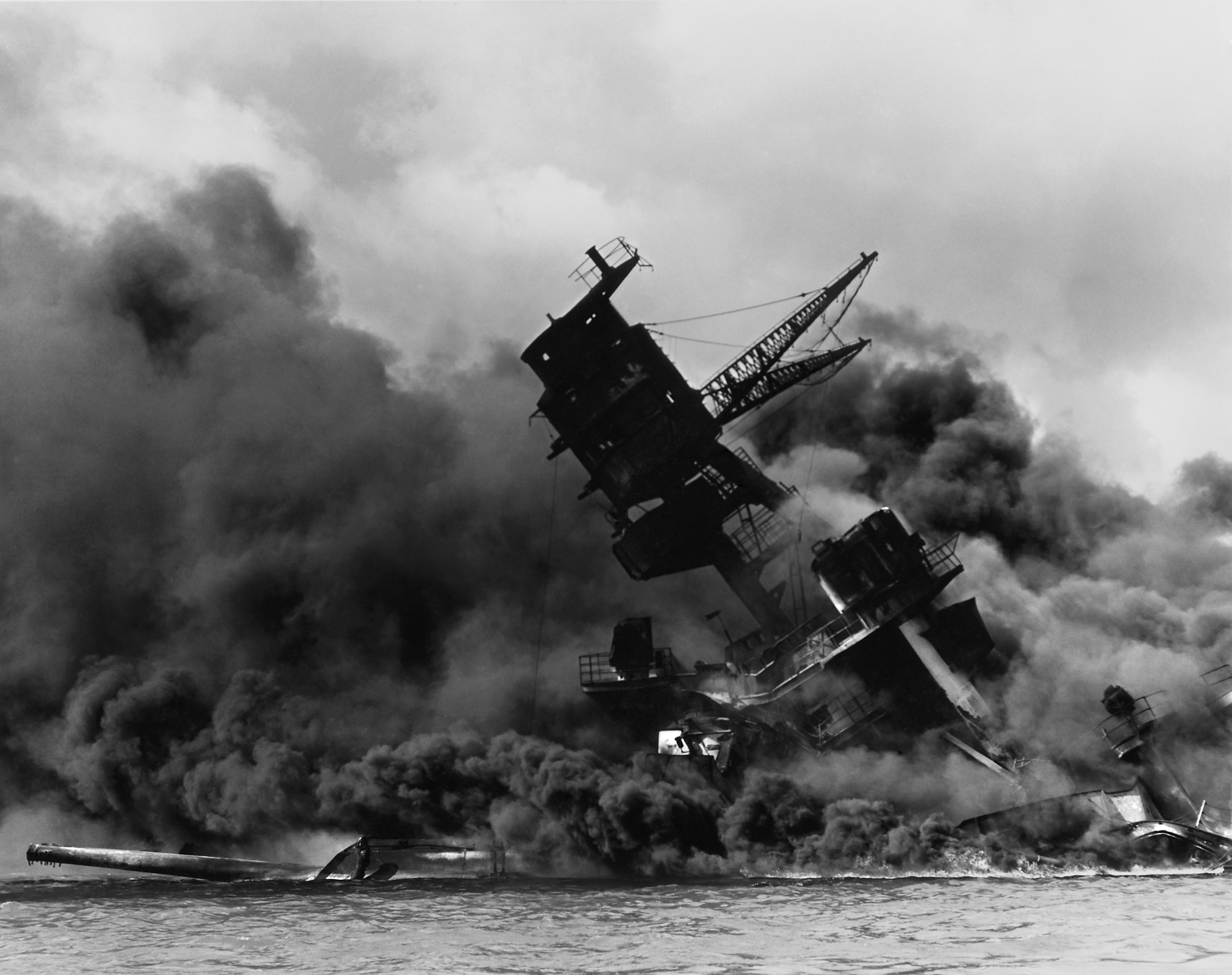
The USS Arizona burning during the Japanese attack on Pearl Harbor

Article 1 of the 1907 Hague Convention III – The Opening of Hostilities prohibited the initiation of hostilities against neutral powers "without previous and explicit warning, in the form either of a reasoned declaration of war or of an ultimatum with conditional declaration of war" and Article 2 further stated that "[t]he existence of a state of war must be notified to the neutral Powers without delay, and shall not take effect in regard to them until after the receipt of a notification, which may, however, be given by telegraph." Japanese diplomats intended to deliver the notice to the United States thirty minutes before the attack on Pearl Harbor occurred on 7 December 1941, but it was delivered to the U.S. government an hour after the attack was over. Tokyo transmitted the 5,000-word notification (commonly called the "14-Part Message") in two blocks to the Japanese Embassy in Washington, but transcribing the message took too long for the Japanese ambassador to deliver it in time.

The 14-Part Message was not, moreover, a declaration of war, but was instead about sending a message to U.S. officials that peace negotiations between Japan and the U.S. were likely to be terminated. Japanese officials were well aware that the 14-Part Message was not a proper declaration of war as required by the 1907 Hague Convention III – The Opening of Hostilities. They decided not to issue a proper declaration of war anyway as they feared that doing so would expose their secret attack on Pearl Harbor to the Americans.

Some historical negationists and conspiracy theorists charge that President Franklin D. Roosevelt willingly allowed the attack to happen to create a pretext for war, but no credible evidence exists to support the claim. The diary of Henry L. Stimson, Roosevelt's Secretary of War, showed that Roosevelt believed in late November 1941 that a Japanese attack on British or Dutch soil was "likely," but was "confident that the Japanese would not dare to start hostilities against the United States." The day after the attack on Pearl Harbor, Japan declared war on the U.S. and the U.S. likewise declared war on Japan.

Simultaneously with the bombing of Pearl Harbor on 7 December 1941 (Honolulu time), Japan invaded the British colony of Malaya, bombed Singapore, and began land actions in Hong Kong, without a declaration of war or an ultimatum. Both the United States and United Kingdom were neutral when Japan attacked their territories without explicit warning of a state of war.

The U.S. officially classified all 3,649 military and civilian casualties and destruction of military property at Pearl Harbor as non-combatants as there was no state of war between the U.S. and Japan when the attack occurred. Joseph B. Keenan, the chief prosecutor in the Tokyo Trials, says that the attack on Pearl Harbor not only happened without a declaration of war but was also a "treacherous and deceitful act". In fact, Japan and the U.S. were still negotiating for a possible peace agreement which kept U.S. officials distracted up to the point that Japanese planes launched their attack on Pearl Harbor. Keenan explained the definition of a war of aggression and the criminality of the attack on Pearl Harbor:

The concept of aggressive war may not be expressed with the precision of a scientific formula, or described like the objective data of the physical sciences. Aggressive War is not entirely a physical fact to be observed and defined like the operation of the laws of matter. It is rather an activity involving injustice between nations, rising to the level of criminality because of its disastrous effects upon the common good of international society. The injustice of a war of aggression is criminal of its extreme grosses, considered both from the point of view of the will of the aggressor to inflict injury and from the evil effects which ensue ... Unjust war are plainly crimes and not simply torts or breaches of contracts. The act comprises the willful, intentional, and unreasonable destruction of life, limb, and property, subject matter which has been regarded as criminal by the laws of all civilized peoples ... The Pearl Harbor attack breached the Kellogg–Briand Pact and the Hague Convention III. In addition, it violated Article 23 of the Annex to the Hague Convention IV, of October 1907 ... But the attack of Pearl Harbor did not alone result in murder and the slaughter of thousands of human beings. It did not eventuate only in the destruction of property. It was an outright act of undermining and destroying the hope of a world for peace. When a nation employs a deceit and treachery, using periods of negotiations and the negotiations themselves as a cloak to screen a perfidious attack, then there is a prime example of the crime of all crimes.

Admiral Isoroku Yamamoto, who planned the attack on Pearl Harbor, was fully aware that if Japan lost the war, he would be tried as a war criminal for that attack; as it turned out, he was killed by the United States Army Air Forces in Operation Vengeance in 1943. At the Tokyo Trials, Prime Minister Hideki Tojo, Shigenori Tōgō, then Foreign Minister, Shigetarō Shimada, the Minister of the Navy, and Osami Nagano, Chief of Naval General Staff, were charged with crimes against peace (charges 1 to 36) and murder (charges 37 to 52) in connection with the attack on Pearl Harbor. Along with war crimes and crimes against humanity (charges 53 to 55), Tojo was among the seven Japanese leaders sentenced to death and executed by hanging in 1948, Shigenori Tōgō received a 20-year sentence, Shimada received a life sentence, and Nagano died of natural causes during the Trial in 1947.

Over the years, many Japanese nationalists argued that the attack on Pearl Harbor was justified as an act of self-defense in response to the oil embargo imposed by the United States. Most historians and scholars agree that the oil embargo cannot be used as justification for using military force against a foreign nation imposing the embargo because there is a clear distinction between a perception of something being essential to the welfare of the nation-state and a threat sufficiently serious to warrant an act of force in response, which Japan had failed to consider. Japanese scholar and diplomat Takeo Iguchi states that it is "[h]ard to say from the perspective of international law that exercising the right of self-defense against economic pressures is considered valid." While Japan felt that its dreams of further expansion would be brought to a halt by the American embargo, this "need" cannot be considered proportional with the destruction suffered by the U.S. Pacific Fleet at Pearl Harbor, intended by Japanese military planners to be as devastating as possible.

=== Mass killings ===
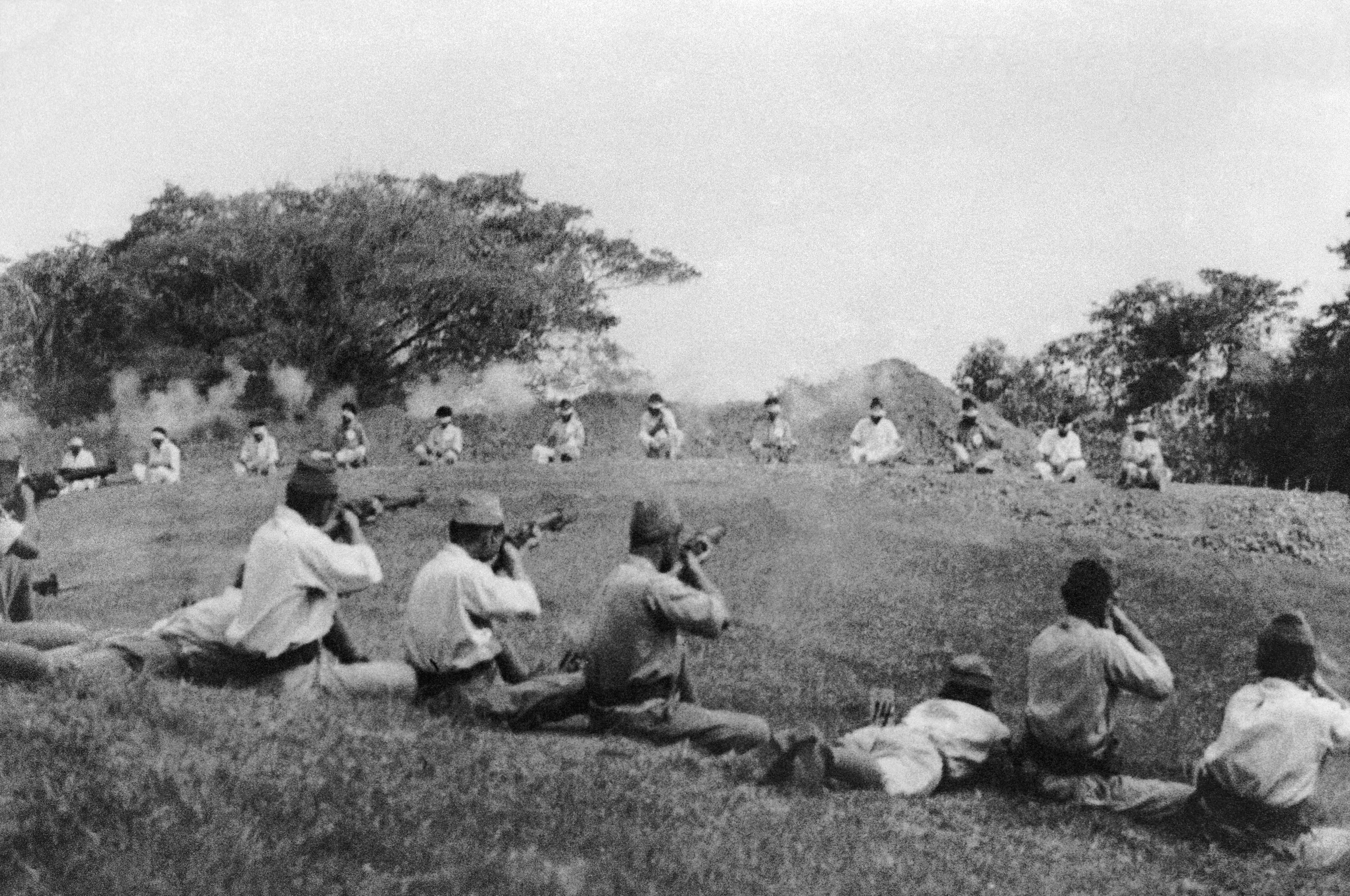
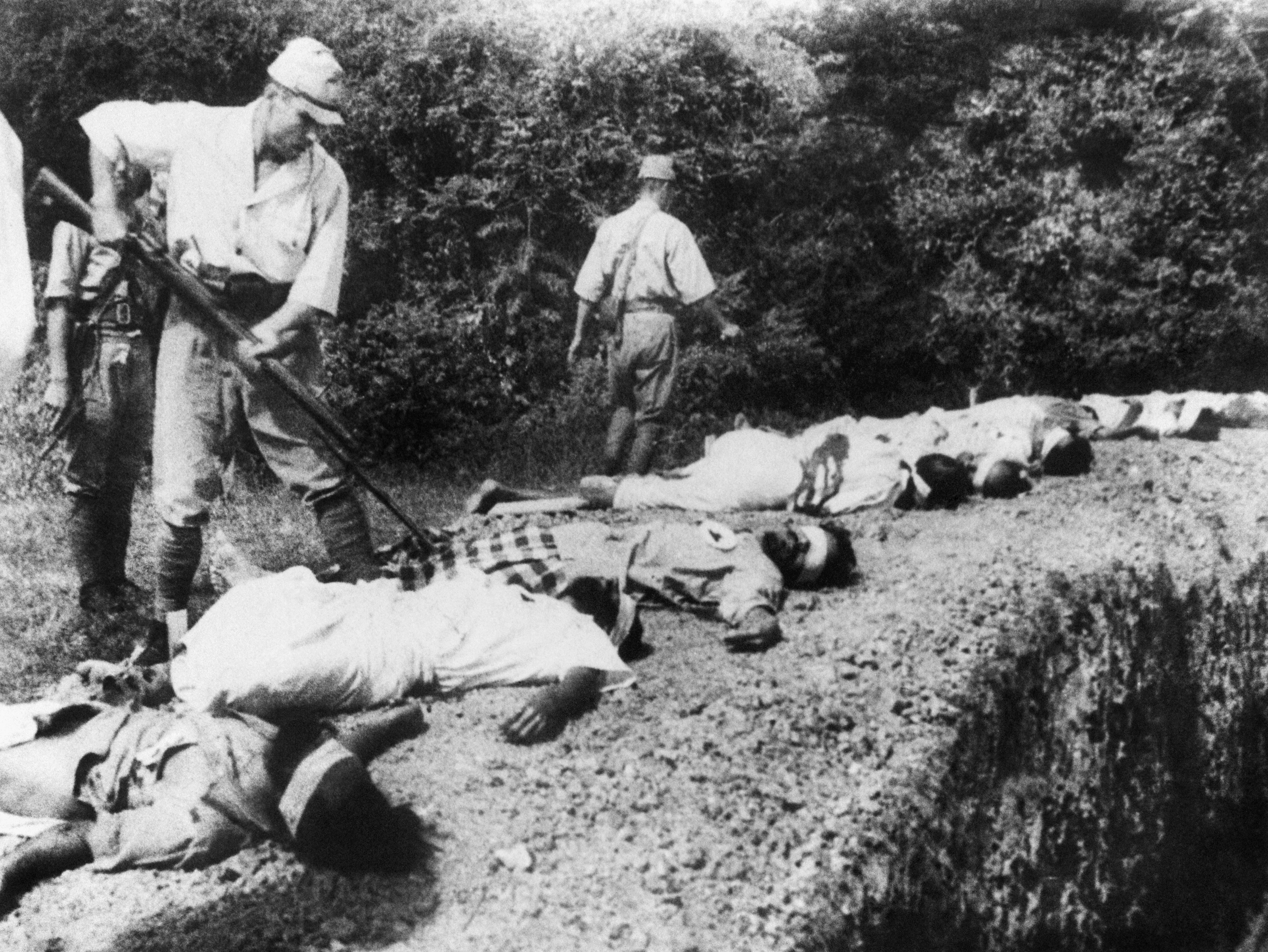
Japanese soldiers shooting blindfolded Sikh prisoners and then bayonetting them. Photos discovered after the liberation of Singapore.

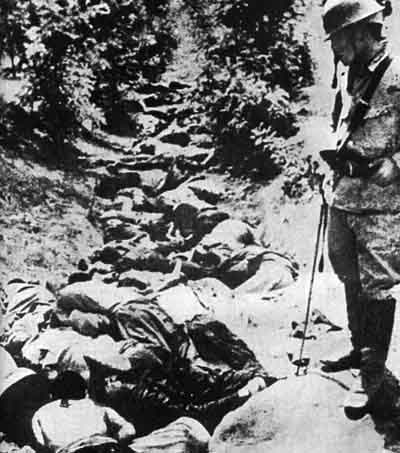
Xuzhou, China, 1938. A mass grave filled with bodies of Chinese civilians, murdered by Japanese soldiers.

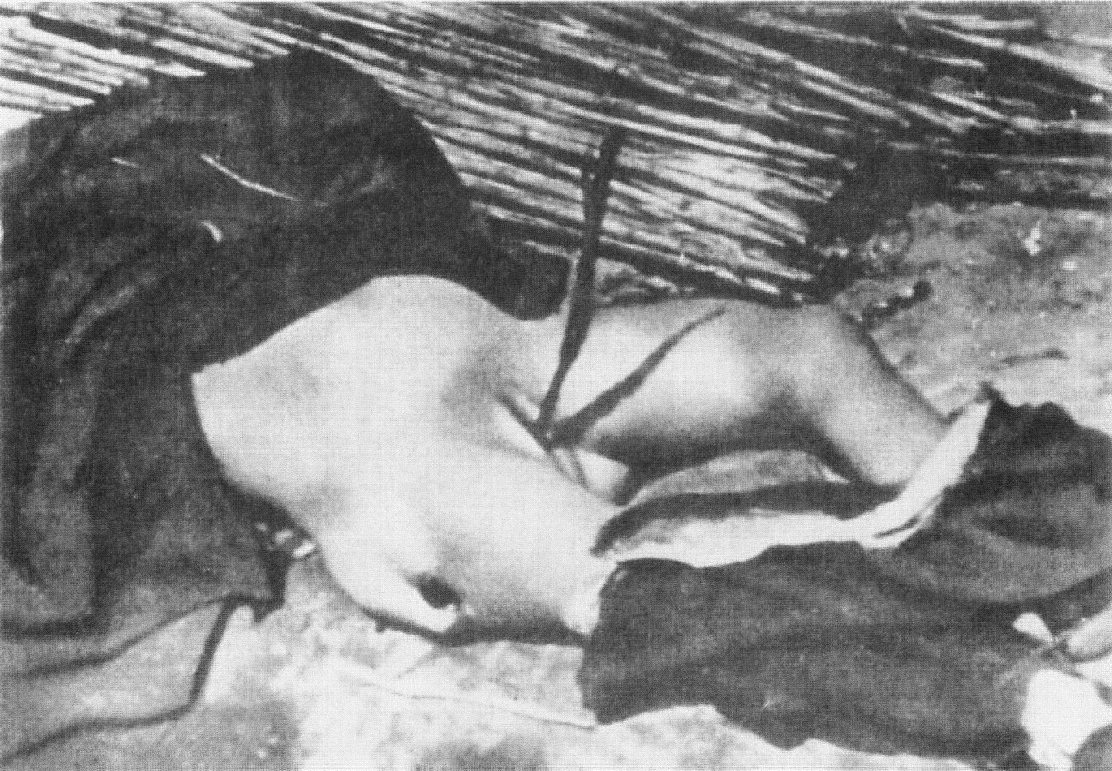
Photo taken in Xuzhou, showing the body of a Chinese woman who was raped and killed by Japanese soldiers

The estimated number of people who were killed by Japanese troops varies. R. J. Rummel, a professor of political science at the University of Hawaiʻi, estimated that between 1937 and 1945, the Japanese military murdered from nearly three to over ten million people. His best estimate is likely six million Chinese, Indians, Koreans, Malays, Indonesians, Filipinos, and Indochinese, among others, including European, American, and Australian prisoners of war. According to Rummel, "This democide [i.e., death by government] was due to a morally bankrupt political and military strategy, military expediency and custom, and national culture." According to Rummel, in China alone, from 1937 to 1945, approximately 3.9 million Chinese were killed, mostly civilians, as a direct result of the Japanese operations and a total of 10.2 million Chinese were killed in the course of the war. According to the British historian M. R. D. Foot, civilian deaths were between 10 million and 20 million. British historian Mark Felton claims that up to 30 million people were killed, most of them civilians.:

The Japanese murdered 30 million civilians while "liberating" what they called the Greater East Asia Co-Prosperity Sphere from colonial rule. About 23 million of these were ethnic Chinese. It is a crime that in sheer numbers is far greater than the Nazi Holocaust. In Germany, Holocaust denial is a crime. In Japan, it is government policy. But the evidence against the navy – precious little of which you will find in Japan itself – is damning.

One of the major atrocities which was committed during this period was the Nanjing Massacre of 1937–38, when, according to the findings of the International Military Tribunal for the Far East, the Japanese Army massacred as many as 260,000 civilians and prisoners of war. Other estimates have placed the death toll as high as 350,000. The Memorial Hall of the Victims in Nanjing Massacre by Japanese Invaders has the death figure of 300,000 inscribed on its entrance.

In the early 1980s, Japanese journalist Honda Katsuichi conducted extensive interviews with Chinese survivors and reviewing existing Japanese records. Katsuichi determined the acts of violence which Japanese troops perpetrated during the Nanjing Massacre were not isolated incidents. Instead, they were part of a broader pattern of atrocities which Japanese troops committed against the Chinese population in the Lower Yangtze region since the Battle of Shanghai.

Hosaka Akira was an army physician, and his infantry battalion was stationed in China. In his diary, he admitted to following an order to murder civilians in the Chinese city of Changzhou. Hosaka's diary, which documents the atrocities which Japanese troops committed in Changzhou, has been validated by various Japanese sources. In 1987, his squad leader, Kitayama, confessed to killing civilians in Changzhou. Makihara Nobuo was part of an infantry platoon that entered a Chinese town. In his diary, Makihara wrote that his Machine Gun Company followed orders to indiscriminately kill all civilians in the town.

During the Second Sino-Japanese War, the Japanese followed what has been called a "killing policy", including killings which they committed against minorities such as Hui Muslims in China. According to Wan Lei, "In a Hui clustered village in Gaocheng county of Hebei, the Japanese captured twenty Hui men among whom they only set two younger men free through "redemption", and they buried the other eighteen Hui men alive. In Mengcun village of Hebei, the Japanese killed more than 1,300 Hui people within three years of their occupation of that area." The Japanese also desecrated and destroyed mosques, and destroyed Hui cemeteries. After the Nanjing Massacre, mosques in Nanjing were found filled with dead bodies. Many Hui Muslims in the Second Sino-Japanese War fought against the Japanese military.

In addition, The Hui Muslim county of Dachang was subjected to massacres by the Japanese military.

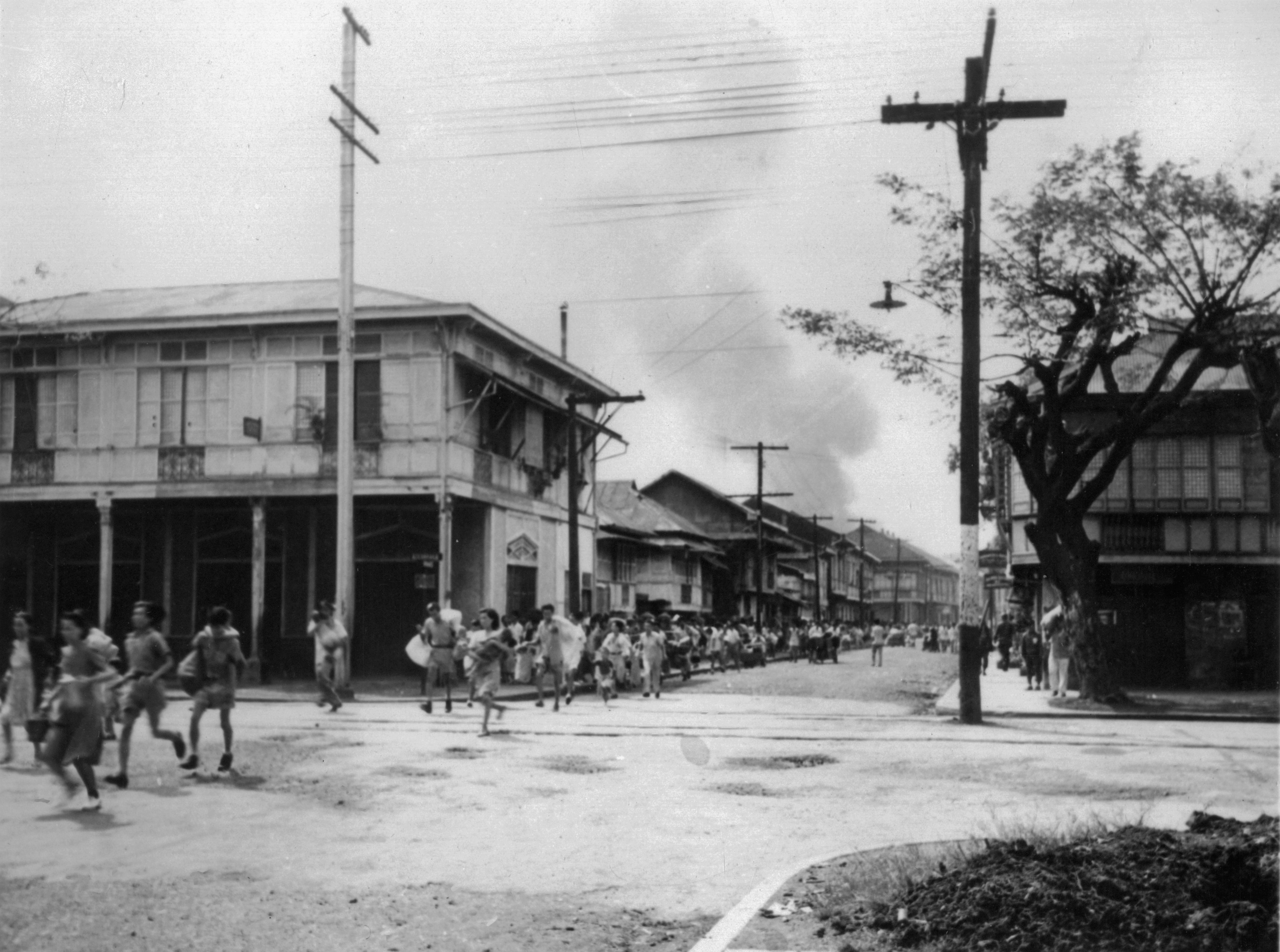
Citizens of Manila run for safety from suburbs burned by Japanese soldiers, 10 February 1945.

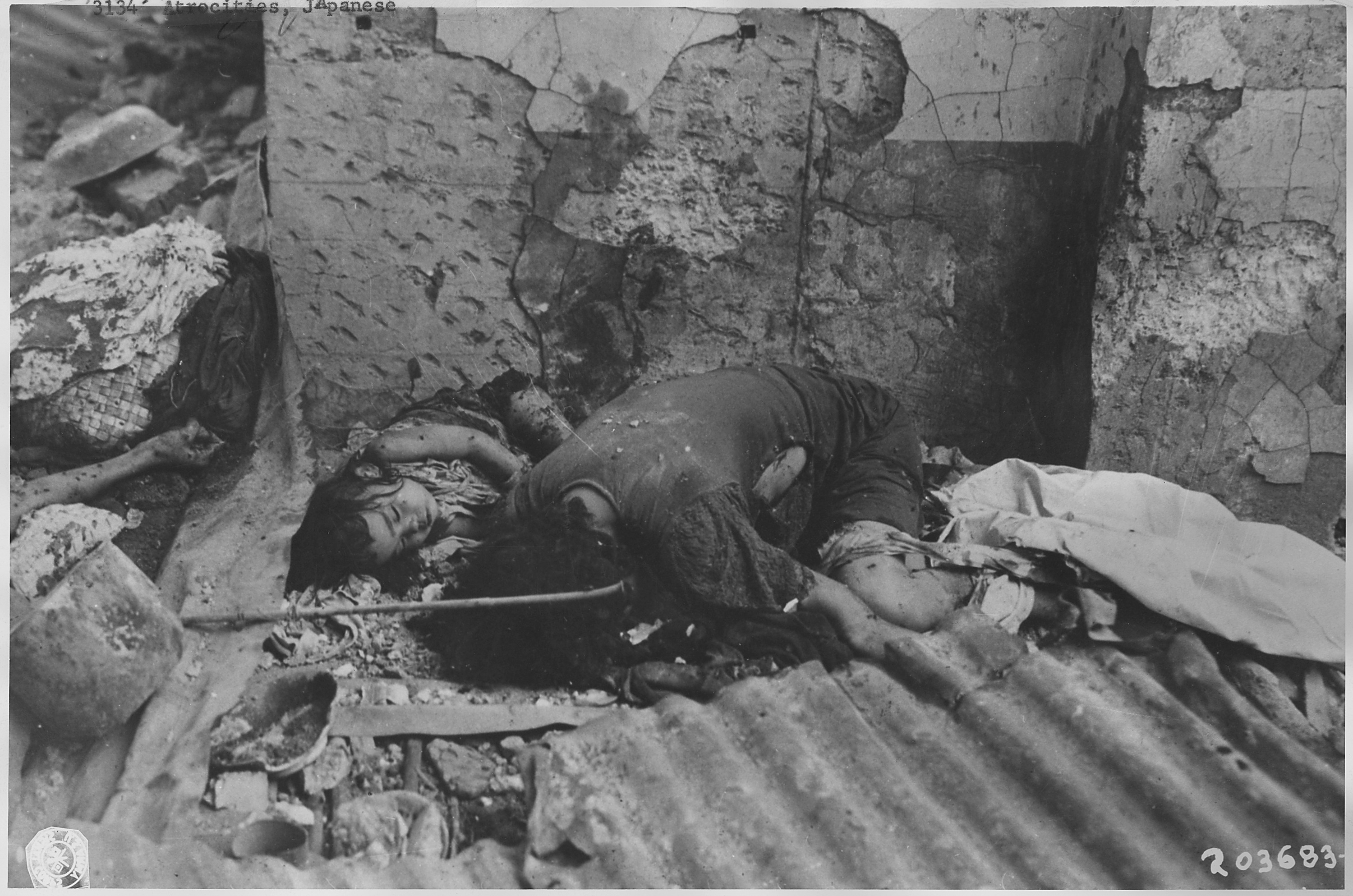
Photo of a Filipino woman and child killed by Japanese forces in Manila

Another massacre committed by Japanese forces during this period was the Parit Sulong massacre in Japanese-occupied Malaya, when, according to the findings of the International Military Tribunal for the Far East, the Imperial Japanese Army massacred approximately five hundred prisoners of war, although even higher estimates have been made. A similar crime committed was the Changjiao massacre in China. Back in Southeast Asia, the Laha massacre resulted in the deaths of 705 prisoners of war on Japanese-occupied Indonesia's Ambon Island, and in Japanese-occupied Singapore's Alexandra Hospital massacre, Japanese soldiers murdered hundreds of wounded Allied soldiers, innocent citizens, and medical staff.

In Southeast Asia, the Manila massacre of February 1945 resulted in the death of 100,000 civilians in the Japanese-occupied Philippines. It is estimated that at least one out of every 20 Filipinos died at the hands of the Japanese during the occupation. In Singapore during February and March 1942, the Sook Ching massacre was a systematic extermination of "anti-Japanese" elements among the Chinese population; however, Japanese soldiers did not try to identify who was "anti-Japanese". As a result, the Japanese soldiers engaged in indiscriminate killing. Former Prime Minister of Singapore Lee Kuan Yew, who was almost a victim of the Sook Ching Massacre, has stated that there were between 50,000 and 90,000 casualties. According to Lieutenant Colonel Hishakari Takafumi, a newspaper correspondent at the time, the plan was to ultimately kill about 50,000 Chinese, and 25,000 had already been murdered when the order was received to scale down the operation.

There were other massacres of civilians, such as the Kalagon massacre. In wartime Southeast Asia, the Overseas Chinese and European diaspora were particular targets of Japanese abuse; in the former case, this was motivated by a Sinophobic resentment of the historic expanse and influence of Chinese culture, and in the latter, by a racist Pan-Asianism and a desire to show former colonial subjects the impotence of their former rulers. The Japanese executed all the Malay Sultans on Kalimantan and wiped out the Malay elite in the Pontianak incidents. In the Jesselton Revolt, the Japanese killed thousands of native civilians during the Japanese occupation of British Borneo and nearly wiped out the entire Suluk Muslim population of the coastal islands. During the Japanese occupation of the Philippines, when a Moro Muslim juramentado swordsman launched a suicide attack against the Japanese, the Japanese would massacre the man's entire family or village. However, Chinese immigrants in Southeast Asia were sometimes spared if they supported the war effort, whether sincerely or not. This also applied to other ethnicities.

50 Moros were vivisected by a Japanese unit, the 33rd coast guard squad in Zamboanga in Mindanao in which Akira Makino served in. Moro guerillas armed with spears were the main enemies of the Japanese in the area.

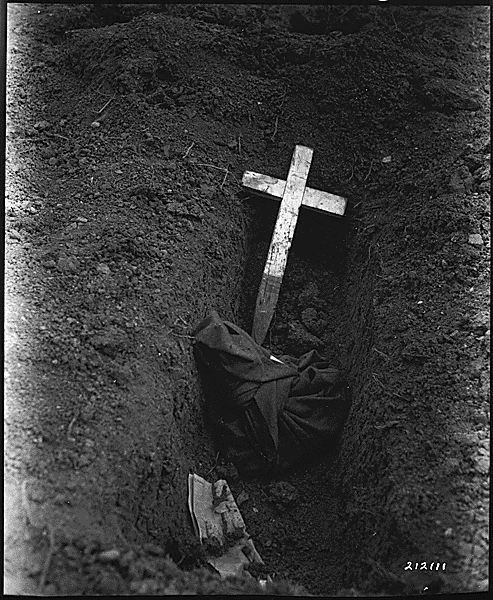
U.S. Army personnel identified the charred remains of the Americans captured at Bataan and Corregidor and burned alive on Palawan, 20 March 1945.

Historian Mitsuyoshi Himeta reports that a "Three Alls Policy" (Sankō Sakusen) was implemented in China from 1942 to 1945, and by itself resulted in the deaths of "more than 2.7 million" Chinese civilians. This scorched earth strategy, sanctioned by Hirohito himself, directed Japanese forces to "kill all, burn all, and loot all", which resulted in many massacres such as the Panjiayu massacre, where 1,230 Chinese people were killed. Additionally, captured Allied servicemen, and civilians were massacred in various incidents, including the following:

- Alexandra Hospital massacre
- Laha massacre
- Bangka Island massacre
- Parit Sulong Massacre
- Palawan massacre
- SS Behar
- SS Tjisalak massacre perpetrated by Japanese submarine I-8
- Wake Island massacre
- Tinta Massacre
- Bataan Death March
- Sandakan Death Marches
- Shin'yō Maru Incident
- Sulug Island massacre
- Pontianak incidents
- Manila massacre (concurrent with the Battle of Manila)
- Balikpapan massacre
- Dutch East Indies massacres

The Japanese massacred Hui Muslims in their mosques in Nanjing and destroyed Hui mosques in other parts of China. Shen Xi'en and his father Shen Decheng witnessed the corpses of Hui Muslims slaughtered by the Japanese in Nanjing, when he was asked by Hui people to help bury their relatives. The Hui security maintenance leader Sun Shurong and Hui Imams Zhang Zihui, Ma Zihe, Ge Changfa, Wang Shouren, Ma Changfa were involved in collecting Hui corpses and burying them after the Nanjing massacre. The Ji'e lane Mosque caretaker father Zhang was in his 60s when killed by the Japanese and his decomposing corpse was the first to be washed in accordance to Islamic custom and buried. They buried the Hui corpses in Jiuhua mountain, Dongguashi, Hongtu Bridge (where Guangzhou road is now located), Wutai mountain, Donguashi (where Nanjing Normal University is located). Shen Xi'en helped bury 400 Hui bodies including children, women, and men. Shen recalled burying a 7 or 8 year old boy in addition to his mother among the Hui bodies.

Japanese troops used machine guns to massacre Muslim Suluk children and women at a mosque in the aftermath of the Jesselton revolt.

In the Pontianak incidents, the Japanese justified their mass execution of the twelve Arab and Malay Muslim Sultans by claiming that they were planning to rebel and claiming that the Arabs, Sultans, and Chinese were all working to "massacre Japanese". The Japanese report on the incident noted that there were anti-Dutch Chinese independence movements before and linked them to the anti-Japanese conspiracy. On 28 June 1944, the Japanese executed the Sultans of West Kalimantan, including Pontianak, after a naval court martial. The accusations against the Sultans were printed in Borneo Shimbun on 1 July 1944. The Japanese slaughter of the Malay sultans of west Kalimantan led the Dayaks to ascend to the political scene after the violent destruction of the Malay nobility at the hands of the Japanese.

=== Human experimentation and biological warfare ===
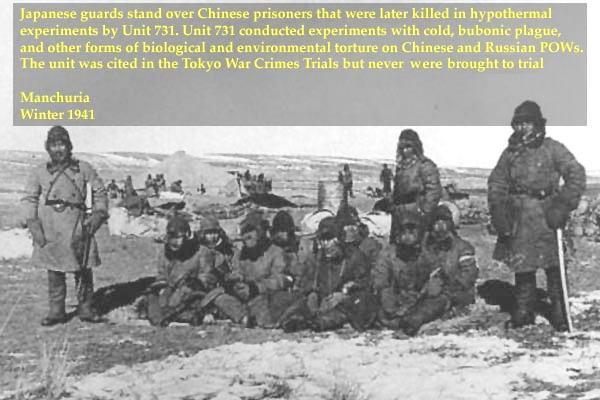
A hypothermia experiment, using Chinese prisoners as subjects under surveillance by Japanese soldiers in 731

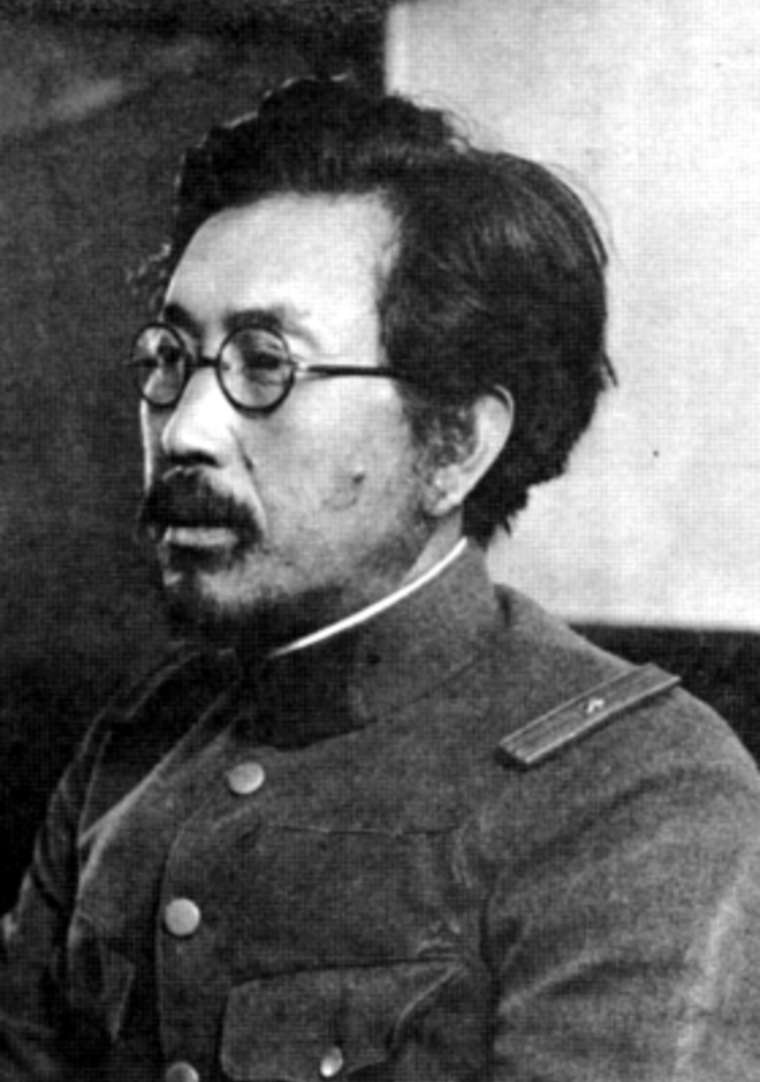
Shirō Ishii, commander of Unit 731

Special Japanese military units conducted experiments on civilians and POWs in China. The purpose of experimentation was to develop biological weapons that could be used for aggression. Biological agents and gases developed from these experiments were used against the Chinese Army and civilian population. These included Unit 731 under Shirō Ishii. Victims were subjected to experiments including but not limited to vivisection, amputations without anesthesia, testing of biological weapons, horse blood transfusions, and injection of animal blood into their corpses. Anesthesia was not used because it was believed that anesthetics would adversely affect the results of the experiments.

To determine the treatment of frostbite, prisoners were taken outside in freezing weather and left with exposed arms, periodically drenched with water until frozen solid. The arm was later amputated; the doctor would repeat the process on the victim's upper arm to the shoulder. After both arms were gone, the doctors moved on to the legs until only a head and torso remained. The victim was then used for plague and pathogens experiments.

A former unit 731 member testified:

As soon as the symptoms were observed, the prisoner was taken from the cell and into the dissection room...he was strapped down, still screaming frightfully. One of the doctors stuffed a towel into his mouth, then with one quick slice of the scalpel he was opened up." Witnesses at vivisections report that the victim usually lets out a horrible scream when the cut is made, and the voice stops soon after.

Furthermore, according to the 2002 International Symposium on the Crimes of Bacteriological Warfare, the number of people killed by the Imperial Japanese Army germ warfare and human experiments is around 580,000. Top officers of Unit 731 were not prosecuted for war crimes after the war, in exchange for turning over the results of their research to the Allies. They were also reportedly given responsible positions in Japan's pharmaceutical industry, medical schools, and health ministry.

While Unit 731 is the most infamous facility, scholars have shown that Japanese biological and chemical warfare units stationed in Beijing (Unit 1855), Nanjing (Unit 1644) and Canton (Unit 1688) also experimented on human subjects.

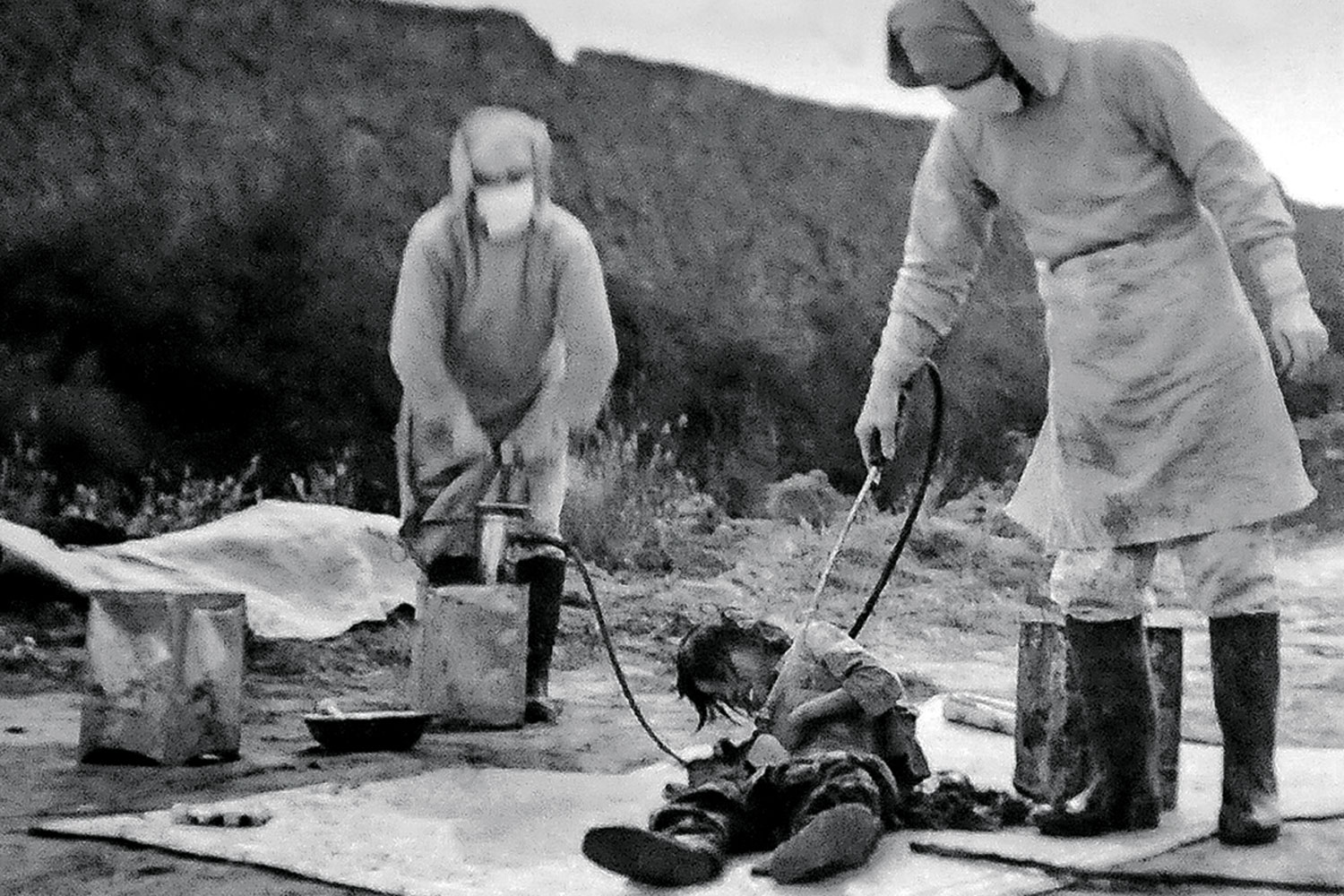
Manchukuo officials participate in a "plague prevention" operation, which is a bacteriological test directed by Japan's 'Unit 731', in November of 1940 at Nong'an County, northeast China's Jilin Province.

One case of human experimentation occurred in Japan itself. At least nine of 11 members of Lt. Marvin Watkins' 29th Bomb Group crew (of the 6th Bomb Squadron) survived the crash of their U.S. Army Air Forces B-29 bomber on Kyūshū, on 5 May 1945. The bomber's commander was separated from his crew and sent to Tokyo for interrogation, while the other survivors were taken to the anatomy department of Kyushu University, at Fukuoka, where they were subjected to vivisection or killed.

In 1939, Unit 731 launched 100 periodic biological attacks on military and civilian targets. Attacks include contaminating wells with intestinal pathogens, distribution of microbe-laced foods, air drops of plague inflected fleas, and aerial spray of contaminants. Although the effectiveness of the biological attacks is hard to assess, civilian casualties are estimated to be high, with several hundred thousand killed.

Some Japanese physicians killed their victims with potassium cyanide before dissecting them, while others used chloroform. Yoshio Onodera, who conducted human experiments within Unit 1644, testified that his group conducted experiments on roughly 100-150 people. They would then murder their victims by injecting them with chloroform.

On 11 March 1948, 30 people, including several doctors and one female nurse, were brought to trial by American military tribunal. Fukujiro Ishiyama, the doctor most responsible for the experimentation, killed himself before the trial started. Charges of cannibalism were dropped, but 23 people were found guilty of vivisection or wrongful removal of body parts. Five were sentenced to death, four to life imprisonment, and the rest to shorter terms. In 1950, the military governor of Japan, General Douglas MacArthur, commuted all of the death sentences and significantly reduced most of the prison terms. All of those involved in relation to the university vivisection, with the exception of Isamu Yokoyama, the general most responsible for allowing the experimentation to happen, walked free no later than 1958. Yokoyama died in prison in 1952. In 1980, an author found that one of the doctors who was supposed to be executed was still alive and practicing medicine.

In China, the Japanese waged ruthless biological warfare against Chinese civilians and soldiers. Japanese aviators sprayed fleas carrying plague germs over metropolitan areas, creating bubonic plague epidemics. Japanese soldiers used flasks of diseases-causing microbes, which included cholera, dysentery, typhoid, anthrax, and paratyphoid, to contaminate rivers, wells, reservoirs, and houses; mixed food with deadly bacteria to infect hungry Chinese civilians; and even passed out chocolate filled with anthrax bacteria to the local children.

During the final months of World War II, Japan had planned to use plague as a biological weapon against U.S. civilians in San Diego, California, during Operation Cherry Blossoms at Night, hoping that the plague would spread terror to the American population, and thereby dissuade America from attacking Japan. Planning the operation was finalized on March 26, 1945, but shelved shortly thereafter due to the strong opposition of Chief of General Staff Yoshijirō Umezu. Umezu later explained his decision as such: "If bacteriological warfare is conducted, it will grow from the dimension of war between Japan and America to an endless battle of humanity against bacteria. Japan will earn the derision of the world."

In July 1989, a mass grave of more than one hundred skeletons was unearthed at a construction site in Tokyo, which was the former location of the Army Medical College from 1929 to 1945. Investigators determined that the bones belonged to various ethnic Asian groups of foreign origin, as indicated by the skulls. Investigators also discovered skulls that were marked with scalpels, cut by a sword, or pierced by bullets from a pistol. From these findings, it's inferred that Japanese military physicians conducted experiments on the brains of individuals on the battlefield, and that the evidence was subsequently disposed of and buried at that location.

In 2006, former IJN medical officer Akira Makino stated that he was ordered—as part of his training—to carry out vivisection on about 30 civilian prisoners in the Philippines between December 1944 and February 1945. The surgery included amputations. Most of Makino's victims were Moro Muslims. Ken Yuasa, a former military doctor in China, has also admitted to similar incidents in which he was aggressively performing live vivisections on live Chinese victims, blaming the nationalistic indoctrination of his schooling for his conduct and lack of remorse. Yuasa admitted to killing Chinese captives while training others in surgery. He further added that in order to quickly train military physicians for the battlefield, physicians would gather every few months to perform "surgery drills" in China. Surgery drills involved capturing local citizens, shooting them in the thigh with a bullet, and monitoring the amount of time it would take to extract the bullet. The drills were widespread in China, with most instances involving the abduction of local citizens by the military and their subsequent delivery to the Army's medical division.

The Imperial House of Japan was responsible for the human experimentation programs, as members of the imperial family, including Prince Naruhiko Higashikuni, Prince Chichibu, Prince Mikasa, and Prince Tsuneyoshi Takeda, participated in the programs in various ways, which included authorizing, funding, supplying, and inspecting biomedical facilities.

Shiro Ishii was demoted after the cholera attack he directed in 1942 against Chinese civilians accidentally infected and killed Japanese soldiers and he did not direct anymore biological attacks for the rest of the war. Ishii boasted about his role in the 1940-1941 biological disease attacks and boasted to the Japanese army in the 1942 attacks that he would kill even more, until he accidentally killed Japanese troops with his own weapons, causing a disaster among Japanese ranks and he was forced out and replaced.

This information about the Japanese killing their own soldiers in the campaign came from a Japanese POW captured by Americans in 1944, who admitted that the actual Japanese death toll was far higher than the 1,700 he saw on the documents at the biological warfare headquarters, and that Japanese regularly downplayed their own casualties:

When Japanese troops overran an area in which a [biological weapons] attack had been made during the Chekiang [Zhejiang] campaign in 1942, casualties upward from 10,000 resulted within a very brief period of time. Diseases were particularly cholera, but also dysentery and pest [bubonic plague]. Victims were usually rushed to hospitals in rear. … Statistics which POW saw at Water Supply and Purification Dept Hq at Nanking showed more than 1,700 dead, chiefly from cholera; POW believes that actual deaths were considerably higher, 'it being a common practice to pare down unpleasant figures.'

=== Use of chemical weapons ===
While obtaining precise numbers is difficult, recent studies indicate that the number of Chinese killed by Japanese chemical warfare may have been in excess of 500,000 people.

Throughout the war with China from 1937 to 1945, Japan deployed chemical weapons, including poisonous and irritating gases, against both Chinese military personnel and civilians. This action was denounced by the League of Nations in May 1938.

According to Walter E. Grunden, history professor at Bowling Green State University, the Japanese incorporated gas warfare into many aspects of their army's war against China because they concluded that Chinese forces were unable to retaliate in kind. Their utilization of gas warfare involved deploying specialized gas troops, as well as infantry, artillery, engineers, and air force units. Grunden further added that "from 1937 to 1945, the military services of Japan used chemical weapons on over 2000 occasions, primarily in the China Theater of Operations."

The Narashino Military Academy near Tokyo had assembled a compilation of fifty-six case studies detailing the use of chemical weapons by Japan in China during World War II. This collection included information on lethal agents like Yperite, commonly known as mustard gas. The document was discovered at the National Archives and Records Administration by a Japanese historian.

According to historians Yoshiaki Yoshimi and Kentaro Awaya, during the Second Sino-Japanese War, gas weapons, such as tear gas, were sporadically used in 1937, but in early 1938, the Imperial Japanese Army resorted to the full-scale use of phosgene, chlorine, Lewisite, and nausea gas (red), and from mid-1939, mustard gas (yellow) was used against both Kuomintang and Communist Chinese troops.

In 2004, Yoshimi and Yuki Tanaka discovered documents in the Australian National Archives which state that cyanide gas was tested on Australian and Dutch prisoners in November 1944 on Kai Islands (Indonesia).

According to Yoshimi and Seiya Matsuno, emperor Hirohito signed orders which specified the use of chemical weapons in China. For example, during the Battle of Wuhan from August to October 1938, the Emperor authorized the use of toxic gas on 375 separate occasions, despite the 1899 Hague Declaration IV, 2 – Declaration on the Use of Projectiles the Object of Which is the Diffusion of Asphyxiating or Deleterious Gases and Article 23 (a) of the 1907 Hague Convention IV – The Laws and Customs of War on Land. A resolution adopted by the League of Nations on 14 May condemned the use of poison gas by Japan.

According to Prince Mikasa, a member of the imperial family of Japan, he watched an army film that showed Japanese troops gassing Chinese prisoners who were tied to stakes.

Another incident of chemical warfare occurred during the Battle of Yichang in October 1941, during which the 19th Artillery Regiment helped the 13th Brigade of the IJA 11th Army by launching 1,000 yellow gas shells and 1,500 red gas shells at the Chinese National Revolutionary Army. The area was crowded with Chinese civilians unable to evacuate. Some 3,000 Chinese soldiers were in the area and 1,600 were affected. The Japanese report stated that "the effect of gas seems considerable".

In 2004, Yoshimi Yoshiaki published the most comprehensive study of Japan's military use of poisonous gases in China and Southeast Asia. Yoshimi discovered a battle report by a Japanese Infantry Brigade that detailed its use of mustard gas in a major operation against the Communist-led Eighth Route Army in Shanxi Province in the winter of 1942. The unit which carried out the operation noted the severity of the mustard gas attack, and it also commented about the anti-Japanese sentiment which existed among the members of the civilian population who were affected by the mustard gas.

=== Torture of prisoners of war ===
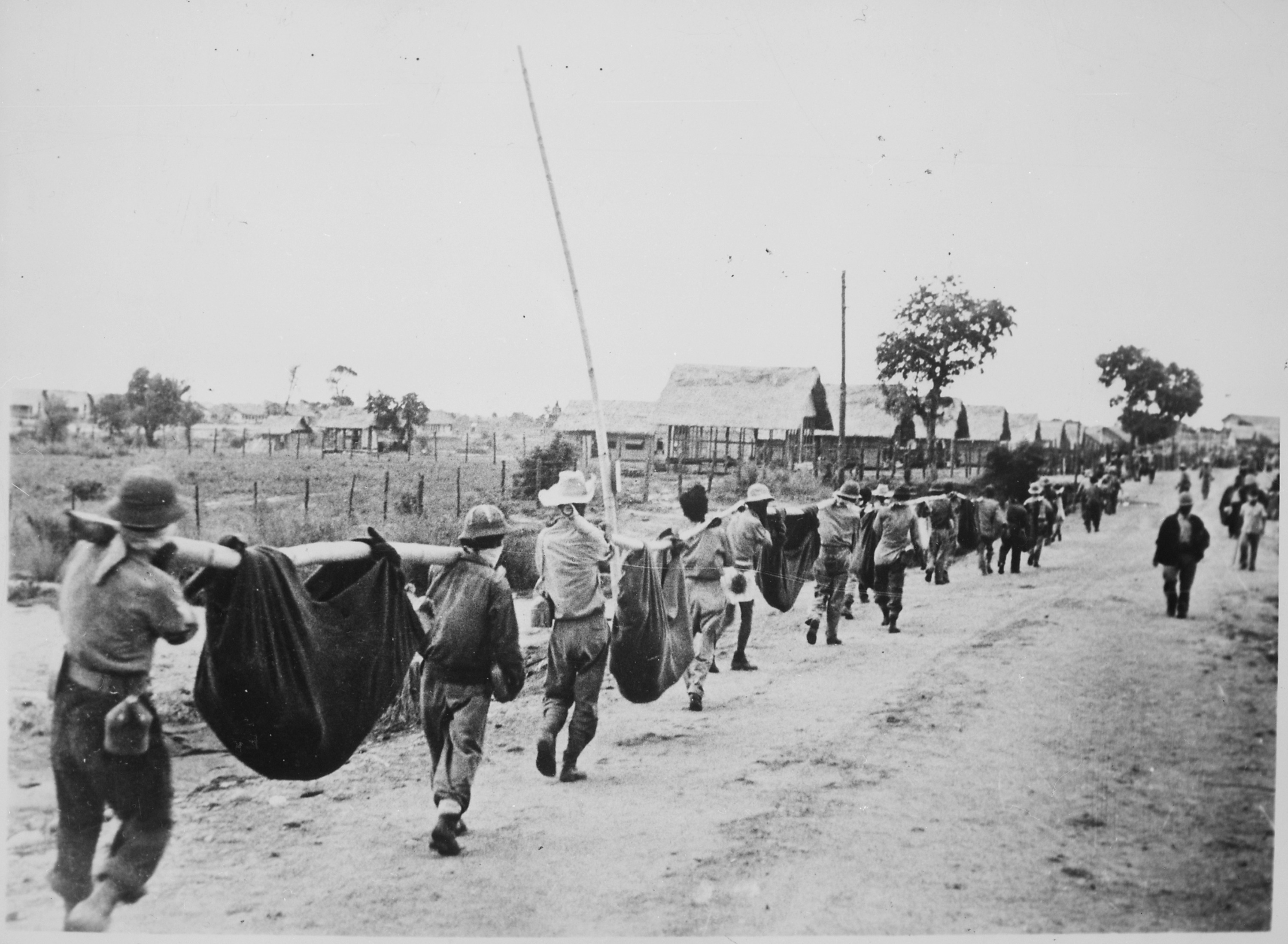
A burial detail of American and Filipino POWs killed during the Bataan Death March, 1942

Japanese imperial forces employed widespread use of torture on prisoners of war, usually in an effort to gather military intelligence quickly. Tortured POWs were often later executed. A former Japanese Army officer who served in China, Uno Shintaro, stated:

The major means of getting intelligence was to extract information by interrogating prisoners. Torture was an unavoidable necessity. Murdering and burying them follows naturally. You do it so you won't be found out. I believed and acted this way because I was convinced of what I was doing. We carried out our duty as instructed by our masters. We did it for the sake of our country. From our filial obligation to our ancestors. On the battlefield, we never really considered the Chinese humans. When you're winning, the losers look really miserable. We concluded that the Yamato [Japanese] race was superior.

After the atomic bombing of Hiroshima during World War II, the Japanese secret police tortured a captured American P-51 fighter pilot named Marcus McDilda to discover how many atomic bombs the Allies had and what the future targets were. McDilda, who had originally told his captors he knew nothing about the atomic bomb (and who indeed knew nothing about nuclear fission), "confessed" under further torture that the United States had 100 atomic bombs and that Tokyo and Kyoto were the next targets:

As you know, when atoms are split, there are a lot of pluses and minuses released. Well, we've taken these and put them in a huge container and separated them from each other with a lead shield. When the box is dropped out of a plane, we melt the lead shield and the pluses and minuses come together. When that happens, it causes a tremendous bolt of lightning and all the atmosphere over a city is pushed back! Then when the atmosphere rolls back, it brings about a tremendous thunderclap, which knocks down everything beneath it.

— Marcus McDilda,

According to many historians, one of the favorite techniques of Japanese torturers was "simulated drowning", in which water was poured over the immobilized victim's head, until they suffocated and lost consciousness. They were then resuscitated brutally (usually with the torturer jumping on their abdomen to expel the water) and then subjected to a new session of torture. The entire process could be repeated for about twenty minutes. (Note: "Interestingly, although the United States condemned these practices, notably during the Tokyo Trial, its armed forces used the same technique several times in the context of the war on terror. They then proceeded to deny that simulated drowning was torture, an opinion shared by at least The Wall Street Journal which, on 12 November 2005, commenting on the torture of alleged terrorists of Al-Qaeda, published an editorial denying that the technique had "any proximity to torture". During the presidential elections in the United States in 2008, these interpretations were the subject of controversy, with candidates John McCain and Barack Obama considering the practice as torture, as opposed to other Republican candidates.)

=== Execution and killing of captured Allied airmen ===
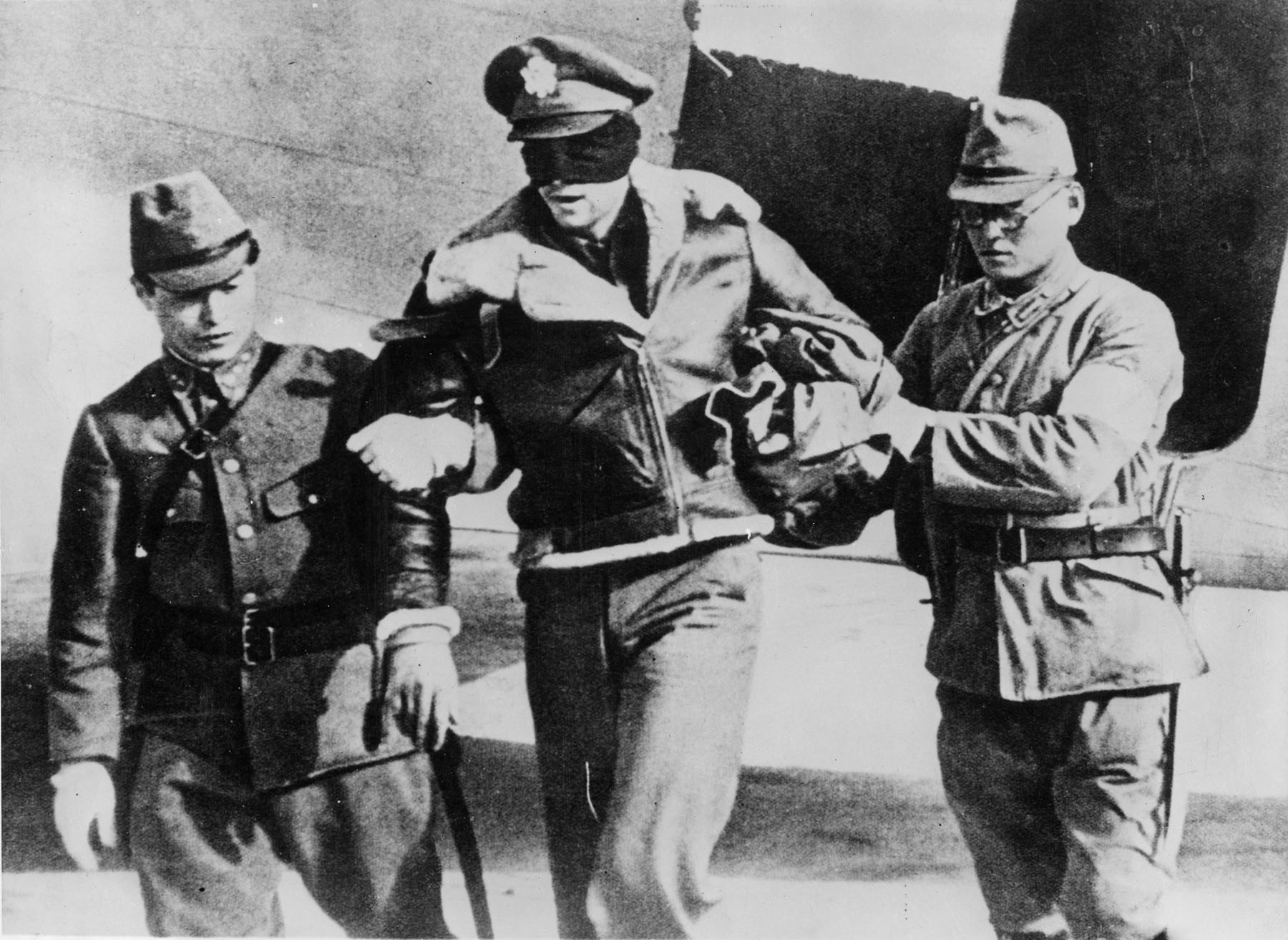
A blindfolded Doolittle Raider taken captive in 1942

Many Allied airmen captured by the Japanese on land or at sea were executed in accordance with official Japanese policy. During the Battle of Midway in June 1942, three American airmen who were shot down and landed at sea were spotted and captured by Imperial Japanese Navy warships. After being tortured, machinist mate first class Bruno Gaido and his pilot Ensign Frank O'Flaherty were tied to five-gallon kerosene cans filled with water and dumped overboard from the Japanese destroyer Makigumo; a third airman, Ensign Wesley Osmus, was fatally wounded with an axe before being pushed into the sea from the stern of the Arashi.

On 13 August 1942, Japan passed the Enemy Airmen's Act, which stated that Allied pilots who bombed non-military targets in the Pacific Theater and were captured by Japanese forces were subject to trial and punishment, despite the absence of any international law containing provisions regarding aerial warfare. This legislation was passed in response to the Doolittle Raid on 18 April 1942, in which American B-25 bombers under the command of Lieutenant Colonel James Doolittle bombed Tokyo and other Japanese cities. According to the Hague Convention of 1907 (the only convention Japan had ratified regarding the treatment of prisoners of war), any military personnel captured on land or at sea by enemy troops were to be treated as prisoners of war and not punished for simply being lawful combatants. Eight Doolittle Raiders captured upon landing in China (four months before the passage of the Act) were the first Allied aircrew to be brought before a kangaroo court in Shanghai under the act, charged with strafing of Japanese civilians during the Doolittle Raid. The eight aircrew were forbidden to present any defense and, despite the lack of legitimate evidence, were found guilty of participating in aerial military operations against Japan. Five of the eight sentences were commuted to life imprisonment; the other three airmen were taken to a cemetery outside Shanghai, where they were executed by firing squad on 14 October 1942.

The Enemy Airmen's Act contributed to the deaths of hundreds of Allied airmen throughout the Pacific War. An estimated 132 Allied airmen shot down during the bombing campaign against Japan in 1944–1945 were summarily executed after short kangaroo trials or drumhead courts-martial. Imperial Japanese military personnel deliberately killed 33 American airmen at Fukuoka, including fifteen who were beheaded shortly after the Japanese Government's intention to surrender was announced on 15 August 1945. Mobs of civilians also killed several Allied airmen before the Japanese military arrived to take the airmen into custody. Another 94 airmen died from other causes while in Japanese custody, including 52 who were killed when they were deliberately abandoned in a prison during the bombing of Tokyo on 24–25 May 1945.

=== Execution and killing of captured Allied seamen ===
- Rear Admiral Takero Kouta, commander of the Japanese First Submarine Force at Truk, on 20 March 1943 sent out to subs under his command an order to kill Merchant Navy crewman after the ship was sunk.
- The United States Merchant Navy ship SS Jean Nicolet, torpedoed by Japanese submarine I-8 on 2 July 1944, off Ceylon at 03°28′S 074°30′E. All of the crew and passengers made it into the lifeboats safely. The I-8 forced the 100 onto the deck of the submarine and then killed most of them. The I-8 crew shot at both the crew and the lifeboats. The submarine crew took the crew's valuables. Those not shot, about 30 crew members, were hit and stabbed on the deck. Seeing a plane, the submarine crew tossed overboard the remaining crew and dived. A Catalina flying boat spotted the crew in the water and sent the Royal Navy armed trawler HMS Hoxa to rescue the men. After over 30 hours in the water the crew was rescued on 4 July 1944.
- Merchant Navy SS Behar sank on 6 March 1944, in the Indian Ocean, seventy-two merchant seamen made it into lifeboats. They were taken aboard the heavy cruiser Tone and the crew's valuables taken. The crew was roped up in painful positions, beaten, and locked in an extremely hot store room. By order of Vice Admiral Sakonju, the crew, men and women, were killed. Sakonju was executed for his war crimes in 1947.
- Japanese submarine I-26, after sinking the merchant ship SS Richard Hovey in the Arabian Sea, shot at the crew in their three lifeboats and a two life rafts. I-26 rammed one lifeboats capsizing it. I-26 took the captain and three crew POWs. The four survived and were repatriated after the end of the war.
- Planes from the Japanese aircraft carrier Hiryū sank and killed crew and passengers in the SS Poelau Bras's lifeboats, sinking six of the nine boats off Sumatra.
- I-37 on 27 November 1943 shot and killed eight crewmen in the MV Scotia lifeboats. On 22 February 1944 shot at SS British Chivalry's lifeboats, 13 were killed. On 29 February 1944 SS Ascot's lifeboats were shot at, leaving only seven survivors.
- I-165 on 18 March 1944 shot at SS Nancy Moller's lifeboats, killing 23.
- I-12 on 28 October 1944 shot at the lifeboats of the SS John A. Johnson, killing eleven.
- One survivor, James Blears, a 21-year-old radio operator, of the crew of the SS Tjisalak, lived to tell of the torture and execution of the lifeboat crew by submarine I-8. How many other lifeboat crews did not have survivors is not known.
- Cargo ship Langkoeas lifeboats attacked by I-158 I-158 on 3 January 1942 sank the Dutch cargo ship SS Langkoeas and subsequently attacked its lifeboats with machine guns. After interrogating the crew under threat of torture, its commander threw them back into the sea without their lifeboats.
- Tanker Augustina massacre in the northern Java Sea, south of Cape Puting, Borneo on 1 March 1942. Ship scuttled, lifeboats machine-gunned with only 3 survivors; a Dutch seaman, third engineer Louis Meijer - who spent the rest of the war in Japanese Prisoner Of War camps and reported the massacre immediately upon release post war - and two Chinese crewman.

=== Use of Allied nationals as human shields ===
The prohibition of the use of enemy nationals as human shields is based on Article 23 under Section II of the 1907 Fourth Hague Convention, which states: "A belligerent is [...] forbidden to compel the nationals of the hostile party to take part in the operations of war directed against their own country". A World War I-era 1915 Belgian report stated "[i]f it be not permissible to compel a man to fire on his fellow citizens, neither can he be forced to protect the enemy and to serve as a living screen."

The application is limited to only enemy nationals and it does not apply to the same persons exposed to dangers from aerial and naval attack since the Fourth Hague Convention only governs land warfare. The 1949 Fourth Geneva Convention prohibits parties to the international conflict from using protected persons regardless of nationality as human shields against any type of enemy attacks, closing the gaps mentioned in the preceding sentence.

==== Battle of Manila (1945) ====
During the Battle of Manila in 1945, Japanese forces used Filipino civilians as human shields to protect their positions against the liberating American troops. Author Damien Lewis wrote "The Japanese defenders had taken thousand of Filipinos–men, women, and children alike–hostage, and were holding them as human shields. Many died in the bombardment and subsequent battles that followed, as the walled city was cleared in bitter street-to-street fighting." Alec Wahlman wrote:

Unlike US forces, the Japanese in Manila did not allow the presence of the civilian population to interfere with their operations. In fact, they actively used the population as both shields and targets ... On one occasion, an American forward observer spotted some Japanese moving supplies, while twenty Filipinos were held at gunpoint nearby, including a Filipino girl tied naked to a tree, to avoid drawing American artillery fire.

An American World War II veteran who fought in the 1945 Battle of Manila stated "the Japanese would use Philippine civilians as human shields when they were trying to get away. The Japs would grab them and drag them in front of them. We couldn't shoot at the Japanese when they had the civilians in front of them." When American forces reached Intramuros, they realized 4,000 Filipino civilians were held hostage within the wall, most of whom were rounded up by the Japanese and used as human shields. U.S. commanders demanded the Japanese soldiers to surrender or release the hostages but were met in response with silence. American artillery and infantry assaults on the wall began as a result, killing over 1,000 Japanese and taking 25 prisoners, but the ensuing fight with the Japanese defenders also caused considerable and collateral damage along the way.

The American assault on Intramuros weakened Japanese defenses, and the Japanese decided to release 3,000 hostages, most of them females and children, because most of the men under Japanese captivity were murdered. At the end, the use of human shields along with the Manila massacre by the Japanese resulted in the deaths of 100,000 civilians in the battle.

=== Cannibalism ===
Many written reports and testimonies which were collected by the Australian War Crimes Section of the Tokyo tribunal, and investigated by prosecutor William Webb (the tribunal's future Judge-in-Chief), indicate that Japanese personnel committed acts of cannibalism against Allied prisoners of war in many parts of Asia and the Pacific. In many cases, these acts of cannibalism were inspired by ever-increasing Allied attacks on Japanese supply lines, and the death and illness of Japanese personnel which resulted from hunger. According to historian Yuki Tanaka: "cannibalism was often a systematic activity which was conducted by whole squads which were under the command of officers". This frequently involved murder for the purpose of securing bodies. For example, a British Indian Army POW, Havildar Changdi Ram, testified that "[on November 12, 1944,] the Kempeitai beheaded [an Allied] pilot. I saw this from behind a tree and watched some of the Japanese cut flesh from his arms, legs, hips, buttocks and carry it off to their quarters ... They cut it [into] small pieces and fried it."

In some cases, flesh was cut from living people: another Indian POW, Lance Naik Hatam Ali (later a citizen of Pakistan), testified in New Guinea and stated:

... the Japanese started selecting prisoners and every day one prisoner was taken out and killed and eaten by the soldiers. I personally saw this happen and about 100 prisoners were eaten at this place by the Japanese. The remainder of us were taken to another spot 50 miles [80 km] away where 10 prisoners died of sickness. At this place, the Japanese again started selecting prisoners to eat. Those selected were taken to a hut where their flesh was cut from their bodies while they were alive and they were thrown into a ditch where they later died.

According to another account by Jemadar Abdul Latif of 4/9 Jat Regiment of the Indian Army who was rescued by the Australian Army at the Sepik Bay in 1945:

At the village of Suaid, a Japanese medical officer periodically visited the Indian compound and selected each time the healthiest men. These men were taken away ostensibly for carrying out duties, but they never reappeared.

Perhaps the most senior officer convicted of cannibalism was Lt Gen. Yoshio Tachibana (立花芳夫,Tachibana Yoshio), who with 11 other Japanese personnel was tried in August 1946 in relation to the execution of U.S. Navy airmen, and the cannibalism of at least one of them, during August 1944, on Chichijima, in the Bonin Islands. The airmen were beheaded on Tachibana's orders. Because military and international law did not specifically deal with cannibalism, they were tried for murder and "prevention of honorable burial". Tachibana was sentenced to death, and hanged.

The Taiwanese Aboriginal Buyan Nawi (Japanese name Tokunaga Mutsuo) served in the Fifth Takasago-Giyutai and was from the Tayai ethnic group. He saw Japanese officers getting diarrhea from drinking unboiled water and begging him for coconuts for hydration. He also saw Japanese soldiers and officers cannibalising and eating the flesh of other Japanese soldiers they killed and that they "lost their senses".

In the Philippines, numerous cannibalism incidents were conducted by the Japanese on the remains of murdered civilian Filipinos during and after the occupation. Notable examples occurred in Bukidnon, where after the war, the Philippine Military Police documented seven Japanese soldiers ghoulishly feasting on the flesh of a murdered Filipino woman at Malaybalay. Malaybalay at the time was forested and had numerous wildlife that can be hunted, fruit-bearing trees, and fish-filled rivers. The report was the third cannibalism incident conducted by the Japanese in the Bukidnon plateau alone. Numerous cannibalism incidents occurred across the country.

A Japanese prisoner tried to justify cannibalism of other Japanese to US Navy officer Donald Keene, saying: "If your comrade, feeling himself dying, were to say to you, 'I beg you to eat me so that the rest of you can live,' what would you do? Wouldn't you be moved by the spirit of self-sacrifice which denied the individual for the survival of many?" Keene then noted that he was lying since the people who got cannibalised in New Guinea did not volunteer. A letter sent to Ted de Bary in Okinawa on 23 September 1945 from Donald Keene in Guam mentioned that a gang of Japanese led by a Japanese man named Ohora were living off roots and lizards but came across an Okinawan civilian and killed and ate his flesh. Another one in the group, Shōji started tossing away the Okinawan's gristle due to disgust, but Ohora then said Shōji was stealing the gristle to eat when he found out. Shigeru, the Okinawan's 12-13 year old son also lived there, and Ohora said he needed to be eaten as well. Shōji said "But Shigeru is a nice boy. Let's not kill him. We can get along on lizards, " Ohora said, " If you don't get Shigeru, we will kill you and eat you instead." So Ohora, Shōji and the others killed and ate Shigeru and they said he tasted better, except for his testicles which Shōji said "They didn't taste very good." after eating them. After the Japanese were arrested by the Americans, Shōji and Ohora were caught when they discussed what they did with other prisoners.

During the Battle of Northern Burma and Western Yunnan, an American Y-FOS liaison to the Chinese 54th Army, First Lieutenant Richard D. Shoemaker said he personally saw corpses of Japanese who were cannibalized by other Japanese at Zhaigongfang (Chai-kung-tang) “[W]e saw the body of a dead Jap. The head, hands and feet still had flesh on them showing no sign of decay…. The rest of the body was bare and no flesh whatsoever on the bones. The skin had the appearance of having the flesh cut off—here were no jagged or uneven edges.” Near the kitchen he found 7 Japanese bodies and he found 12 bodies in total with no decomposition on the feet, hands and head but the flesh on the rest of the body cut off.

In addition to North Zhaigongfang, cannibalised Japanese corpses with flesh cut away from arms, buttocks and thighs were found by Regiment Commander Tao at Lengshui Gorge. There were also black feces which showed signs of cannibalism at Zhaigongfang. General Dorn noted: "A battalion of our men and Chinese troops made a successful surprise attack at a place called Jiangcha on the western slope of Mt. Gaoligong. When we made our way to the mess hall at the headquarters an American liaison officer came upon a most surprising example of cannibalism: bodies at all stages of preparation were stacked there like firewood. Portions of some corpses had already been skinned. Long strips of flesh had been cut from others. Some corpses were stripped down to bone. The strangest part was that the heads, hands and legs had been left untouched. Many strips of human flesh it seemed had been stripped from the arms and legs and hung in the trees to dry. Other bits of meat were boiling in two large pots... The Chinese army were quite disturbed to find that people would actually eat human flesh. I think this is the best propaganda information. But my idea was overruled by orders from the Military Affairs Council in Chongqing"

=== Avoidable hunger ===
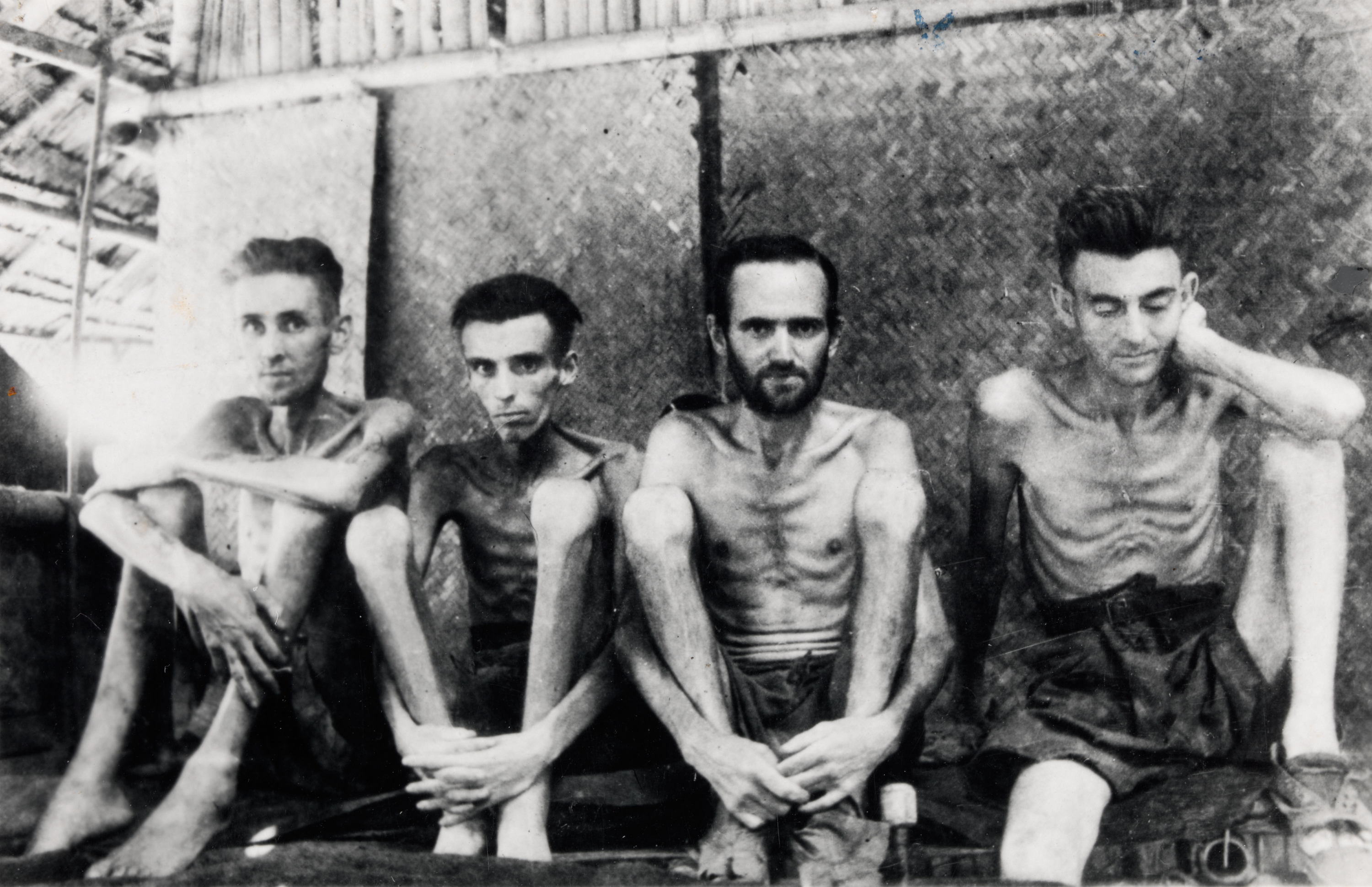
Australian and Dutch prisoners of war at Tarsau in Thailand, 1943

Deaths caused by the diversion of resources to Japanese troops in occupied countries were also considered war crimes, because Article 52 under Section III of the 1907 Fourth Hague Convention states that "Requisitions in kind and services ... shall be in proportion to the resources of the country". Millions of civilians in Southeast Asia – especially in Vietnam and Dutch East Indies, which were major producers of rice – died during the avoidable hunger in 1944–45.

In the Vietnamese famine of 1944–1945, one to two million Vietnamese starved to death in the Red River Delta of northern Vietnam due to the Japanese occupation, as the Japanese seized Vietnamese rice without paying for it. In Phat Diem the Vietnamese farmer Di Ho was one of the few survivors who saw the Japanese steal grain. The North Vietnamese government accused both France and Japan of the famine and said 1–2 million Vietnamese died. Võ An Ninh took photographs of dead and dying Vietnamese during the great famine. Starving Vietnamese were dying throughout northern Vietnam in 1945 due to the Japanese seizure of their crops. By the time the Chinese came to disarm the Japanese forces, Vietnamese corpses were on the streets of Hanoi and had to be cleaned up by students.

=== Forced labor ===
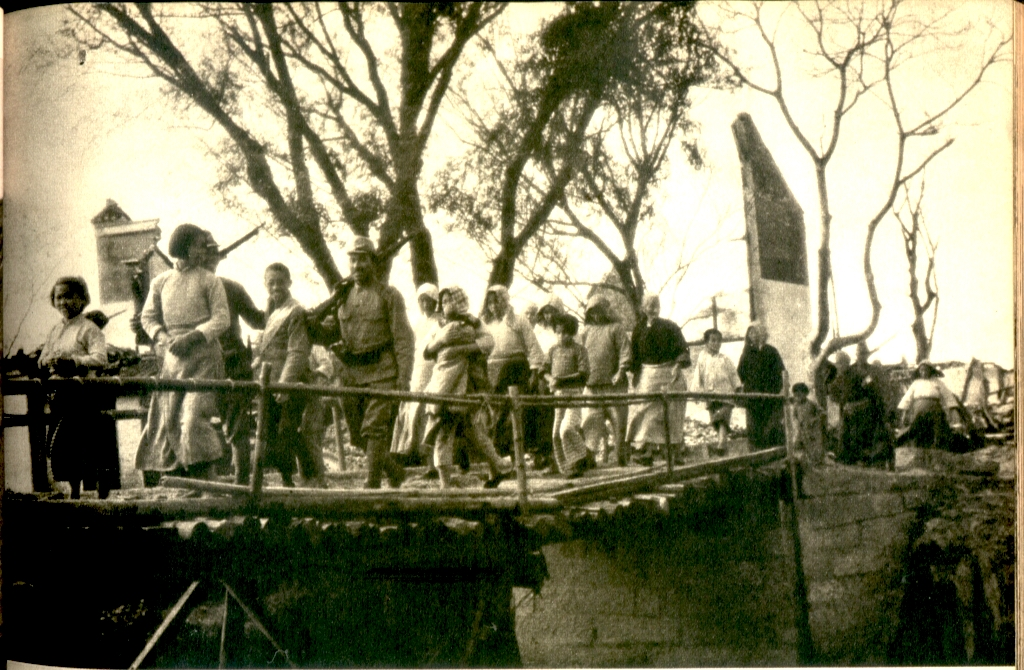
Japanese soldiers escorting Chinese forced-labour farm workers, 1937

The Japanese military's use of forced labor, by Asian civilians and POWs, also caused many deaths. According to a joint study by historians including Zhifen Ju, Mitsuyoshi Himeta, Toru Kubo, and Mark Peattie, more than 10 million Chinese civilians were mobilised by the Kōa-in (Japanese Asia Development Board) to perform forced labour. More than 100,000 civilians and POWs died in the construction of the Burma-Siam Railway.

The U.S. Library of Congress estimates that in Java the Japanese military forced between four and ten million rōmusha (Japanese: "manual laborers") to work. About 270,000 of these Javanese laborers were sent to other Japanese-held areas in Southeast Asia, but only 52,000 were repatriated to Java, likely indicating an eighty percent death rate.

According to historian Akira Fujiwara, Emperor Hirohito personally ratified the decision to remove the constraints of international law (The Hague Conventions) on the treatment of Chinese prisoners of war in the directive of 5 August 1937. This notification also advised staff officers to stop using the term "prisoners of war". The Geneva Convention exempted POWs of sergeant rank or higher from manual labour, and stipulated that prisoners performing work should be provided with extra rations and other essentials. Japan was not a signatory to the 1929 Geneva Convention on the Prisoners of War at the time, and Japanese forces did not follow the convention, although they ratified the 1929 Geneva Convention on the Wounded and Sick.

Shortly after the war, Japan's Foreign Ministry wrote a comprehensive report about Chinese laborers. The report estimated that of some 40,000 Chinese laborers taken to Japan, nearly 7,000 had died by the end of the war. The Japanese burned all copies except for one for the fear of that it might become incriminating evidence at the war crimes trials. In 1958, a Chinese man was discovered hiding in the mountains of Hokkaido. The man did not know that the war was over, and he was one of thousands of laborers who were taken to Japan. This specific event brought attention to Japan's use of forced Asian labor during the war.

Korean men and women were the largest group forced into labor in wartime Japan, and many were not able to return to Korea afterwards.

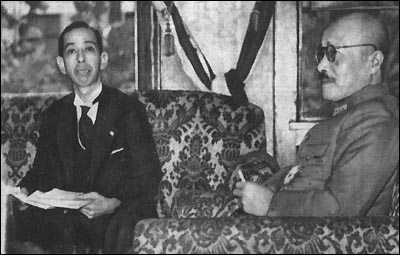
Hideki Tojo (right) with Nobusuke Kishi, the key architect of Manchukuo during 1935–39, known as the "Showa-era monster".

In the 1930s and 1940s the Japanese in Manchukuo forced all members of the indigenous Hezhen ethnic minority into forced labour camps where entire Hezhen clans died, and only 300 Hezhen survived at the end of World War II. The Hezhen population later regrew to 5,000. Hezhen culture was damaged and only a few Hezhen retained traditional knowledge like making fish skin clothing, like the mother of You Wenfeng.

=== Rape ===
The expressions ianfu (慰安婦, "comfort women") or jūgun ianfu (従軍慰安婦, "women of military comfort") are euphemisms for women which were used in military brothels in occupied countries, many of whom were forcibly or fraudulently recruited, and as a result, they are considered victims of sexual assault or sexual slavery.

In addition to the systematic use of comfort women, Japanese troops engaged in wholesale rape in Nanjing, China. John Rabe, the leader of a Safety Zone in Nanjing, China, kept a diary during the Nanjing Massacre, and wrote about the Japanese atrocities committed against the people in the Safety Zone.

Japanese soldiers committed mass rapes in Manila massacre in the Philippines. Japanese soldiers in Bayview Hotel, Manila, raped local Filipino women.

In 1992, historian Yoshiaki Yoshimi published material based on his research in archives at Japan's National Institute for Defense Studies. Yoshimi claimed that there was a direct link between imperial institutions such as the Kōain and "comfort stations". When Yoshimi's findings were published in the Japanese news media on 12 January 1993, they caused a sensation and forced the government, represented by Chief Cabinet Secretary Kato Koichi, to acknowledge some of the facts that same day. On 17 January, Prime Minister Kiichi Miyazawa presented formal apologies for the suffering of the victims, during a trip in South Korea. On 6 July and 4 August, the Japanese government issued two statements by which it recognised that "Comfort stations were operated in response to the request of the military of the day", "The Japanese military was, directly or indirectly, involved in the establishment and management of the comfort stations and the transfer of comfort women", and that the women were "recruited in many cases against their own will through coaxing and coercion".

Japanese veteran Yasuji Kaneko admitted to The Washington Post that the women "cried out, but it didn't matter to us whether the women lived or died. We were the emperor's soldiers. Whether in military brothels or in the villages, we raped without reluctance."

The Bahay na Pula in the Philippines was an example of a military-operated garrison where local women were raped.

On 17 April 2007, Yoshimi and another historian, Hirofumi Hayashi, announced the discovery, in the archives of the Tokyo Trials, of seven official documents suggesting that Imperial military forces, such as the Tokkeitai (naval secret police), directly coerced women to work in frontline brothels in China, Indochina, and Indonesia. These documents were initially made public at the war crimes trial. In one of these, a lieutenant is quoted as confessing having organized a brothel and having used it himself. Another source refers to Tokkeitai members having arrested women on the streets, and after enforced medical examinations, putting them in brothels.

On 12 May 2007, journalist Taichiro Kaijimura announced the discovery of 30 Dutch government documents submitted to the Tokyo tribunal as evidence of a forced massed prostitution incident in 1944 in Magelang.

In other cases, some victims from East Timor testified they were dragged from their homes and forced into prostitution at military brothels even when they were not old enough to have started menstruating and were repeatedly raped by Japanese soldiers "night after night".

A Dutch-Indonesian survivor of sexual slavery, Jan Ruff O'Herne (who later lived in Australia until her death), who gave evidence to the U.S. committee, said the Japanese Government had failed to take responsibility for its crimes, that it did not want to pay compensation to victims, and that it wanted to rewrite history. Ruff O'Herne said that she had been raped "day and night" for three months by Japanese soldiers when she was 21.

On 26 June 2007, the United States House Committee on Foreign Affairs passed a resolution asking that Japan "should acknowledge, apologize, and accept historical responsibility in a clear and unequivocal manner for its military's coercion of women into sexual slavery during the war". On 30 July 2007, the House of Representatives passed the resolution. Japanese Prime Minister Shinzō Abe said this decision was "regrettable".

Scholars have stated that there were as many as 200,000 comfort women, mostly from Korea, and some other countries such as China, Philippines, Burma, the Dutch East Indies, Netherlands, and Australia were forced to engage in sexual activity.

Japanese use of Malays, Javanese Thai, Burmese, Filipino, and Vietnamese women as comfort women was corroborated by testimonies. As a result of the rape, many women were infected with sexually transmitted diseases. There were comfort women stations in Malaya, Indonesia, Philippines, Burma, Thailand, Cambodia, Vietnam, and Korea.

After the defeat of Japan, some of the non-European victims received no compensation or apology and the exploitation of them was ignored.

As the Dutch implemented a war of attrition and scorched earth, they forced Chinese on Java to flee inland, and the Dutch destroyed all important assets, including Chinese factories and property. Local Indonesians joined in on the Dutch violence against the Chinese, looting Chinese property and trying to attack Chinese citizens. However, when the Japanese troops landed and seized control of Java from the Dutch, to people's surprise, the Japanese forced the native Indonesians to stop looting and attacking Chinese and warned the Indonesians they would not tolerate anti-Chinese violence in Java. The Japanese viewed the Chinese in Java and their economic power specifically as important and vital to the Japanese war effort, so they did not physically harm the Chinese of Java, and no known execution or torture of Chinese citizens took place (unlike in other places). There was no violent confrontation between Japanese and Chinese on Java, unlike in British Malaya. The Japanese also allowed Chinese of Java in the Federation of Overseas-Chinese Associations (Hua Chiao Tsung Hui) to form the Keibotai, their own armed Chinese defence corps for protection with Japanese military instructors training them how to shoot and use spears. The Chinese viewed this as important to defending themselves from local Indonesians. The majority of Chinese of Java did not die in the war. It was only after the war ended when Japanese control fell and then the native Indonesians again started attacks against the Chinese of Java when the Japanese were unable to protect them.

In Java, the Japanese heavily recruited Javanese girls as comfort women and brought them to New Guinea, Malaya, Thailand, and other areas foreign to Indonesia besides using them in Java itself. The Japanese brought Javanese women as comfort women to Buru island, and Kalimantan. The Japanese recruited help from local collaborator police of all ethnicities to recruit Javanese girls, with one account accusing Chinese recruiters of tricking a Javanese regent into sending good Javanese girls into prostitution for the Japanese in May 1942. The Japanese also lied to the Javanese telling them that their girls would become waitresses and actresses when recruiting them. The Japanese brought Javanese women as comfort women prostitutes to Kupang in Timor while in East Timor the Japanese took local women in Dili. In Bali, the Japanese sexually harassed Balinese women when they came and started forcing Balinese women into brothels for prostitution, with Balinese men and Chinese men used as recruiters for the Balinese women. All of the brothels in Bali were staffed by Balinese women. In brothels in Kalimantan, native Indonesian women made up 80% of the prostitutes. Javanese girls and local girls were used in a Japanese brothel in Ambon in Batu Gantung. European Dutch women were overrepresented in documents on Dutch East Indies comfort women which did not reflect the actual reality because the Dutch did not care about native Indonesian women being victimised by Japan, refusing to prosecute cases against them since Indonesia was not a UN member at the time. Javanese comfort women who were taken by Japanese to islands outside Java were treated differently depending on whether they stayed on those islands or returned to Java. Since Javanese society was sexually permissive and they kept it secret from other Javanese, the Javanese women who returned to Java fared better, but the Javanese women who stayed on the islands like Buru were treated harsher by their hosts since the locals in Buru were more patriarchal. The Japanese murdered Christians and forced girls into prostitution in Timor and Sumba, desecrating sacred vessels and vestments in churches and using the churches as brothels. Javanese girls were brought as prostitutes by the Japanese to Flores and Buru. Eurasians, Indians, Chinese, Dutch, Menadonese, Bataks, Bugis, Dayaks, Javanese, Arabs, and Malays were arrested and massacred in the Mandor affair.

The Japanese brought Indonesian Javanese girls to British Borneo as comfort women to be raped by Japanese officers at the Ridge road school and Basel Mission Church, and the Telecommunication Center Station (former rectory of the All Saints Church) in Kota Kinabalu as well as ones in Balikpapan and Beaufort. Japanese soldiers raped Indonesian women and Dutch women in the Netherlands East Indies. Many of the women were infected with STDs as a result. Sukarno prostituted Indonesian girls from ethnic groups like Minangkabau to the Japanese. The Japanese destroyed many documents related to their rape of Indonesian Javanese girls at the end of the war so the true extent of the mass rape is uncountable, but testimony witnesses records the names and accounts of Indonesian Javanese comfort women.

Japanese in one instance tried to disguise the Javanese comfort girls they were raping as red cross nurses with red cross armbands when they surrendered to Australian soldiers in Kupang, Timor.

In addition to disguising the Java girls with Red Cross armbands some Dutch girls were also brought to Kupang and native girls from Kupang were also kidnapped by the Japanese while the native men were forced into hard labour.

Indian and Javanese captives in Biak were freed from Japanese control by Allied forces.

Only 70,000 Javanese survived out of 260,000 Javanese forced to labour on the death railway between Burma and Thailand.

In August 1945, the Japanese were getting ready to execute female European internees by shooting in the Dutch East Indies and their plans were only stopped by the atomic bomb with the plans and list of detainees already written down.

Francis Stanley (Frank) Terry, an Australian sailor on a naval vessel, participated in the repatriation of Indonesian Javanese comfort women from islands across Indonesia back to their home.

The Dutch royal family and government seized the money from Japanese comfort women prostitution in the Dutch East Indies territory for itself instead of compensating the women.

The Japanese forced Javanese women to work in brothels and Javanese men to become forced labour at airstrips in Labuan, Borneo. The Javanese men were worked to starvation, resembling skeletons, barely able to move and were sick with beri beri by the time they were freed in June 1945 by Australians. The Japanese reserved a house as a brothel and officer's club on Fox Road in Labuan.

On 28 August 1945, the British and Australians gave medical treatment to 300 Javanese and Malay men slaves of the Japanese who were malnourished and starving from forced labour.

Many Indonesian comfort females were reluctant to talk about their experiences due to shame. A 10-year-old Indonesian girl named Niyem from Karamangmojo in Yogyakarta was repeatedly raped for two months by Japanese soldiers along with other Indonesian girls in West Java. She did not tell her parents what the Japanese did to her when she managed to flee.

The Japanese killed four million Indonesians. After the defeat of Japan, the Dutch generally did not care about Japanese rape of non-white, native Indonesian Muslim girls and most of the time they only charged Japanese war criminals for rape of white Dutch women.

Suharto silenced public discussion in Indonesian on Japanese war crimes in Indonesia in order to stop anti-Japanese sentiment building up but it happened regardless when the movie Romusha came out in 1973 and the Peristiwa Malari (Malari affair) riots broke out in Indonesia in 1974 against Japan. Suharto also sought to silence discussion on Japanese war crimes due to Indonesia's own war crimes in East Timor after 1975, but Indonesians started talking about Indonesian comfort women in the 1990s following the example of Korea. Mardyiem, a Javanese Indonesian comfort woman talked about what happened to her after Indonesian comfort women were interviewed by Japanese lawyers, after decades of being forced to stay silent.

Three major revolts happened against Japan by Indonesians in Java. Japanese forced Indonesians of West Java in Cirebon to hand over a massive quota of rice to the Japanese military with Japanese officers using brutality to extract even more than the official quota. The Indonesians in Cirebon rebelled twice and targeted Indonesian collaborator bureaucrats and Japanese officers in 1944. Japan killed a lot of Indonesian rebels while crushing them with deadly force. In Sukmana, Singapurna, the Tasikmalaya regency, the conservative religious teacher Kiai Zainal Mustafa told his followers that in the month when Muhammad was born they would gain divine protection when he gave a sign. In February 1943, Japanese Kempeitai caught wind of what was happening and came to the area but the roads were blocked to stop them. The Indonesian villagers and students began to fight the Japanese and seized the sabre of the Japanese chief to kill him. More Japanese arrived and 86 Japanese and 153 Indonesian villagers died in the fighting. The Japanese then arrested Zainal and 22 others for execution. Supriyadi lead a Peta mutiny against the Japanese in February 1945.

Japanese raped Malay comfort women but UMNO leader Najib Razak blocked all attempts by other UMNO members like Mustapha Yakub at asking Japan for compensation and apologies.

The threat of Japanese rape against Chitty girls led Chitty families to let Eurasians, Chinese, and full-blooded Indians to marry Chitty girls and stop practicing endogamy.

Japanese soldiers gang raped Indian Tamil girls and women they forced to work on the Burma railway and made them dance naked. 150,000 Tamils were killed on the railway by Japanese brutality. Tamils who got sick from cholera were executed by the Japanese. As Tamil women were raped by Japanese, the Japanese soldiers contracted venereal diseases like soft sore, syphilis, and gonorrhoea, and Thai women also spread those diseases to coolies on the railroad.

=== Looting and destruction of heritage ===
Several scholars have claimed that the Japanese government, along with Japanese military personnel, engaged in widespread looting during the period of 1895 to 1945. The stolen property included private land, as well as many different kinds of valuable goods looted from banks, depositories, vaults, temples, churches, mosques, art galleries, commercial offices, libraries (including Buddhist monasteries), museums and other commercial premises, and private homes.

In China, an eyewitness, journalist F. Tillman of The New York Times, sent an article to his newspaper where he described the Imperial Japanese Army's entry into Nanjing in December 1937: "The plunder carried out by the Japanese reached almost the entire city. Almost all buildings were entered by Japanese soldiers, often in the sight of their officers, and the men took whatever they wanted. Japanese soldiers often forced Chinese to carry the loot."

In Korea, it is estimated that about 100,000 priceless artifacts and cultural goods were looted by Japanese colonial authorities and private collectors during the nearly fifty years of military occupation. The Administration claims that there are 41,109 cultural objects which are located in Japan but remain unreported by the Japanese authorities. Unlike the works of art looted by Nazis in Europe, the return of property to its rightful owners, or even the discussion of financial reparations in the post-war period, met with strong resistance from the American government, particularly General Douglas MacArthur.

According to several historians, MacArthur's disagreement was not based on issues of rights, ethics, or morals, but on political convenience. He spoke on the topic in a radio message to the U.S. Army in May 1948, the transcript of which was found by the magazine Time in the U.S. National Archives. In it, MacArthur states: "I am completely at odds with the minority view of replacing lost or destroyed cultural property as a result of military action and occupation". With the advent of the Cold War, the general feared "embittering the Japanese people towards us and making Japan vulnerable to ideological pressures and a fertile ground for subversive action".

Kyoichi Arimitsu, one of the last living survivors of the Japanese archeological missions which operated on the Korean peninsula, which started early in the twentieth century, agrees that the plunder in the 1930s was out of control, but that researchers and academics, such as himself, had nothing to do with it. However, he recognizes that the excavated pieces which were deemed to be most historically significant were sent to the Japanese governor-general, who then decided what would be sent to Emperor Hirohito.

In 1965, when Japan and South Korea negotiated a treaty to reestablish diplomatic relations the issue of returning the cultural artifacts was raised. However, the then South Korean dictator, Park Chung Hee, preferred to receive cash compensation that would allow him to build highways and steelworks; works of art and cultural goods were not a priority. As a result, at the time the Koreans had to settle for the return of only 1,326 items, including 852 rare books and 438 ceramic pieces. The Japanese claim that this put an end to any Korean claim regarding reparation for cultural goods (or of any other nature). American journalist Brad Glosserman has stated that an increasing number of South Koreans are raising the issue of the repatriation of stolen cultural artifacts from Japan due to rising affluence among the general populace as well as increased national confidence.

Hundreds of Utsul Muslim houses and mosques in Sanya, Hainan, were destroyed by the Japanese in order to build an airport.

=== Perfidy ===
Throughout the Pacific War, Japanese soldiers frequently feigned injury or surrender to lure approaching Allied forces before attacking them. An alleged example of this tactic was the "Goettge Patrol" during the early days of the Guadalcanal campaign in August 1942. After the patrol believed they saw a white flag displayed on the west bank of Matanikau River, Marine Corps Lieutenant Colonel Frank Goettge assembled 25 men, primarily consisting of military intelligence personnel, to search the area. Unknown to the patrol, the white flag was actually a Japanese flag with the Hinomaru disc insignia obscured. A Japanese prisoner was plied with alcohol and in his drunken state mistakenly revealed that there were a number of Japanese soldiers west of the Matanikau River who wanted to surrender. The Goettge Patrol landed by boat west of the Lunga Point perimeter, between Point Cruz and the Matanikau River, on a reconnaissance mission to contact a group of Japanese troops that American forces thought was willing to surrender. The Japanese soldiers were not in fact about to surrender and soon after the patrol landed the group of Japanese naval troops ambushed and almost completely wiped out the patrol. Goettge was among the dead. Only three Americans made it back to American lines in the Lunga Point perimeter alive.

News of the killing and supposed treachery by the Japanese outraged the American Marines:

This was the first mass killing of the Marines on Guadalcanal. We were shocked. Shocked ... because headquarters had believed anything a Jap had to say ... The loss of this patrol and the particularly cruel way in which they had met death, hardened our hearts toward the Japanese. The idea of taking prisoners was swept from our minds. It was too dangerous.

Second Lieutenant D. A. Clark of the 7th Marines told a similar story while patrolling Guadalcanal:

I was on my first patrol here, and we were moving up a dry stream bed. We saw 3 Japs come down the river bed out of the jungle. The one in front was carrying a white flag. We thought they were surrendering. When they got up to us they dropped the white flag and then all 3 threw hand grenades. We killed 2 of these Japs, but 1 got away. Apparently they do not mind a sacrifice to get information.

Samuel Eliot Morison, in his book, The Two-Ocean War: A Short History of the United States Navy in the Second World War, wrote:

There were innumerable incidents such as a wounded Japanese soldier at Guadalcanal seizing a scalpel and burying it in the back of a surgeon who was about to save his life by an operation; and a survivor of the Battle of Vella Lavella, rescued by [torpedo boat] PT-163, pulling a gun and killing a bluejacket [enlisted sailor] in the act of giving a Japanese sailor a cup of coffee.

These incidents, along with many other perfidious actions of the Japanese throughout the Pacific War, led to an American tendency to shoot dead or wounded Japanese soldiers and those attempting to surrender and not readily take them as prisoners of war. Two Marines of Iwo Jima told cautionary tales. One confided:

They always told you take prisoners but we had some bad experiences on Saipan taking prisoners. You take them and then as soon as they get behind the lines they drop grenades and you lose a few more people. You get a little bit leery of taking prisoners when they are fighting to the death and so are you.

Another reported,

Very few of them came out on their own; when they did, why, usually one in the front he'd come out with his hands up and one behind him, he'd come out with a grenade.

=== Attacks on hospital ships ===
Hospital ships are painted white with large red crosses to show they are not combat ships but vessels carrying wounded people and medical staff. Japan had signed the Hague Convention X of 1907 that stated attacking a hospital ship is a war crime.

- On 23 April 1945, USS Comfort was struck by a Japanese suicide plane. The plane crashed through three decks, exploding in surgery, which was filled with medical personnel and patients. Casualties were 28 killed (including six nurses) and 48 wounded, with considerable damage done to the ship.
- USS Hope (AH-7) was attacked and damaged during the Battle of Leyte Gulf and the Battle of Okinawa.
- USS Relief was attacked and damaged at Guam on 2 April 1945.
- On 19 February 1942, the Australian HMHS Manunda was dive-bombed during the Japanese air raids on Darwin; twelve crew and hospital staff were killed and nineteen others were seriously wounded.
- On 14 May 1943, the Australian AHS Centaur was sunk by Japanese submarine I-177 off Stradbroke Island, Queensland with 268 lives lost.
- The Royal Netherlands Navy hospital ship SS Op Ten Noort was bombed on 21 February 1942, in the Java Sea. One surgeon and three nurses were killed, and eleven were badly wounded. After repairs, on 28 February 1942, she was commandeered by the Japanese destroyer Amatsukaze near Bawean Island. The Japanese forced her to transport their POWs. On 20 December 1942, she became the Tenno Maru, a Japanese hospital ship, and the Dutch crew became POWs. As the war came to an end, the ship was first modified and later sunk to cover up the crime.

=== War crimes in Vietnam ===
The Viet Minh started to launch attacks against the Vichy French in 1944, then, they started to launch attacks against the Japanese in early 1945, after Japan replaced the French government on 9 March 1945. After the Viet Minh rejected Japanese demands to cease fighting and support Japan, the Japanese implemented the Three Alls policy (San Kuang) against the Vietnamese, pillaging, burning, killing, torturing, and raping Vietnamese women.

Japanese officers ordered their soldiers to behead and burn Vietnamese. According to some claims, Taiwanese and Manchurian soldiers who served in the Japanese army participated in the atrocities which were committed against the Vietnamese.

On several occasions, the Japanese attacked Vietnamese while they were masquerading as Viet Minh. At the same time, the Japanese tried to turn the Vietnamese against the French by spreading false rumors in which they accused the French of massacring Vietnamese. Similarly, they attempted to turn the Laotians against the Vietnamese by inciting Laotians to kill Vietnamese, in one massacre, Lao murdered seven Vietnamese officials in Luang Prabang and Lao youths were recruited into an anti-Vietnamese organization by the Japanese when they occupied Luang Prabang.

Additionally, the Japanese openly started to commit acts of looting against the Vietnamese. In addition to looting French-owned properties, Japanese soldiers stole watches, pencils, bicycles, money, and clothing.

In 1944 and 1945, Vietnam was in the grip of a famine which was partially caused when the Japanese requisitioned food without payment; the Japanese beheaded starving Vietnamese who stole bread and corn. The Vietnamese professor Văn Tạo and Japanese professor Furuta Moto both conducted a study in the field on the Japanese induced famine of 1945 admitting that Japan killed two million Vietnamese by starvation.

On 25 March 2000, the Vietnamese journalist Trần Khuê wrote an article "Dân chủ: Vấn đề của dân tộc và thời đại"(transl. Democracy: A problem of the nation and the times) in which he harshly criticized ethnographers and historians in Ho Chi Minh City's Institute of Social Sciences such as Dr. Đinh Văn Liên and Professor Mạc Đường for trying to whitewash Japan's atrocities against the Vietnamese by, among other things, changing the death toll of two million Vietnamese dead at the hands of the Japanese famine to one million, calling the Japanese invasion as a presence and calling Japanese fascists as simply Japanese at the Vietnam-Japan international conference.

== War crimes trials ==
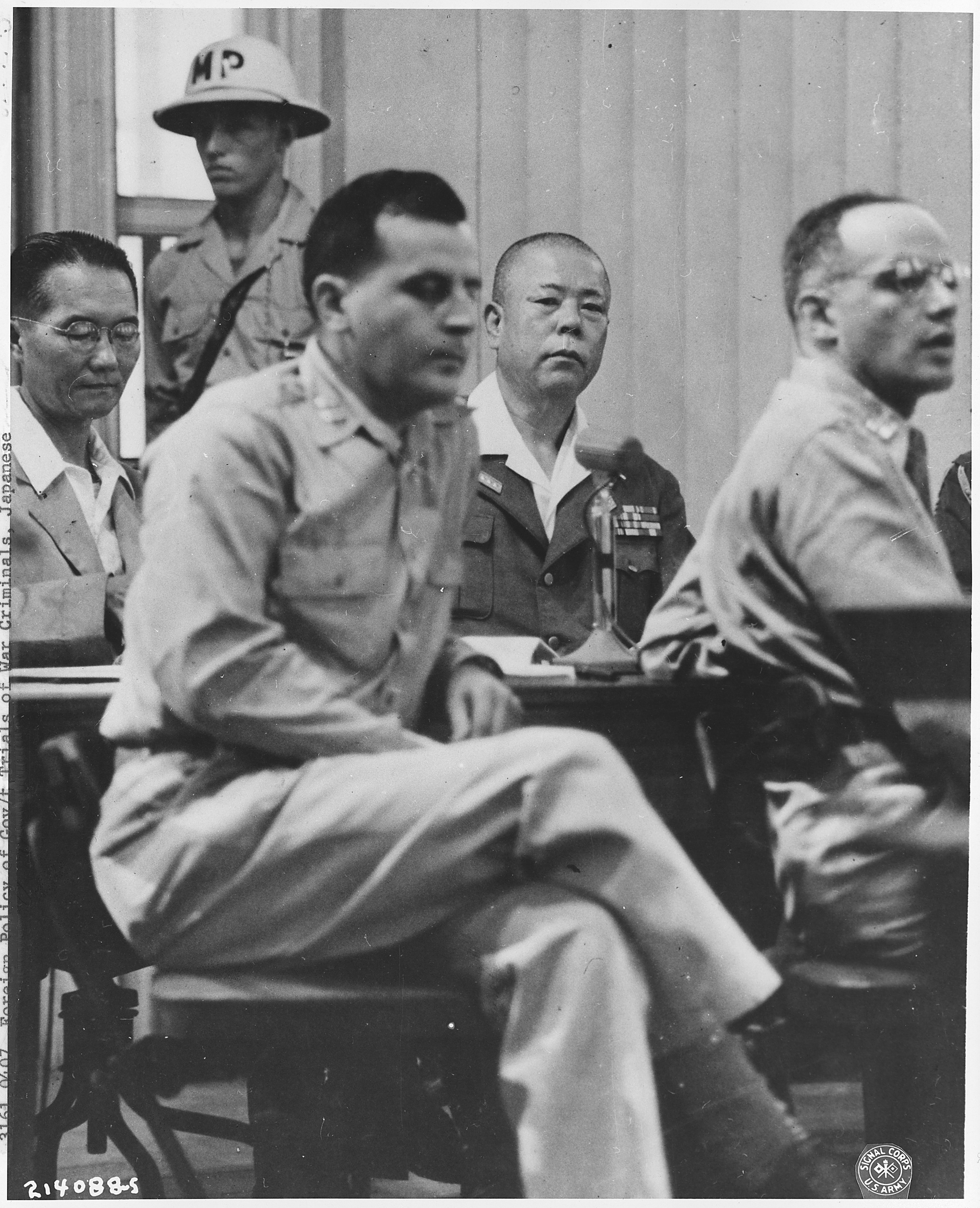
General Tomoyuki Yamashita (2nd right) on trial in 1945 by a U.S. military commission for the Manila massacre and other violations which were committed in Singapore. He was sentenced to death. The case set a precedent (the "Yamashita Standard") on the responsibility of commanders for war crimes.

Soon after the war, the Allied powers indicted 25 persons as Class-A war criminals, and 5,700 persons were indicted as Class-B or Class-C war criminals by Allied criminal courts. Of these, 984 were initially condemned to death, 920 were actually executed, 475 received life sentences, 2,944 received prison terms, 1,018 were acquitted, and 279 were not sentenced or not brought to trial. These indicted war criminals included 178 ethnic Taiwanese and 148 ethnic Korean people. Class A criminals were all tried by the International Military Tribunal for the Far East, also known as "the Tokyo Trials". Other courts were held in numerous places across Asia and the Pacific.

=== Tokyo Trials ===
The International Military Tribunal for the Far East was formed to try accused people in Japan itself.

High-ranking officers who were tried included Kōichi Kido and Sadao Araki. Three former (unelected) prime ministers: Kōki Hirota, Hideki Tojo, and Kuniaki Koiso were convicted of Class-A war crimes. Many military leaders were also convicted. Two people convicted as Class-A war criminals later served as ministers in post-war Japanese governments.

- Mamoru Shigemitsu served as Minister for Foreign Affairs both during the war and in the post-war Hatoyama government.
- Okinori Kaya was Minister of Finance during the war and later served as Minister of Justice in the government of Hayato Ikeda. These two had no direct connection to alleged war crimes committed by Japanese forces, and foreign governments never raised the issue when they were appointed.

Hirohito and all members of the Imperial House of Japan implicated in the war such as Prince Chichibu, Prince Asaka, Prince Takeda and Prince Higashikuni were exonerated from criminal prosecutions by Douglas MacArthur, with the help of Bonner Fellers who allowed the major criminal suspects to coordinate their stories so that the Emperor would be spared from indictment.

Some historians criticize this decision. According to John Dower, "with the full support of MacArthur's headquarters, the prosecution functioned, in effect, as a defense team for the emperor" and even Japanese activists who endorse the ideals of the Nuremberg and Tokyo charters, and who have labored to document and publicize the atrocities of the Showa regime "cannot defend the American decision to exonerate the emperor of war responsibility and then, in the chill of the Cold War, release and soon afterwards openly embrace accused right-wing war criminals like the later prime minister Nobusuke Kishi." For Herbert Bix, "MacArthur's truly extraordinary measures to save Hirohito from trial as a war criminal had a lasting and profoundly distorting impact on Japanese understanding of the lost war."

MacArthur's reasoning was that if the emperor were executed or sentenced to life imprisonment, there would be a violent backlash and revolution from the Japanese from all social classes, which would interfere with his primary goal to change Japan from a militarist, semi-feudal society to a pro-Western modern democracy. In a cable sent to General Dwight D. Eisenhower in February 1946, MacArthur said executing or imprisoning the emperor would require the use of one million occupation soldiers to keep the peace.

=== Other trials ===
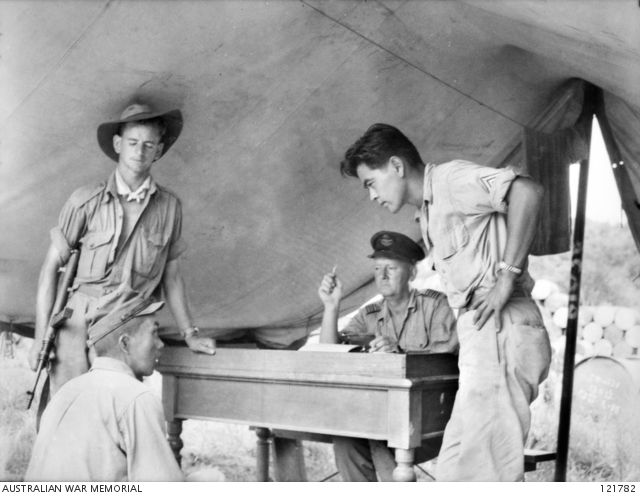
Sergeant Hosotani Naoji of the Kempeitai unit at Sandakan (North Borneo), is interrogated on 26 October 1945, by Squadron Leader F.G. Birchall of the Royal Australian Air Force, and Sergeant Mamo (a Nisei interpreter). Naoji confessed to shooting two Australian POWs and five ethnic Chinese civilians.

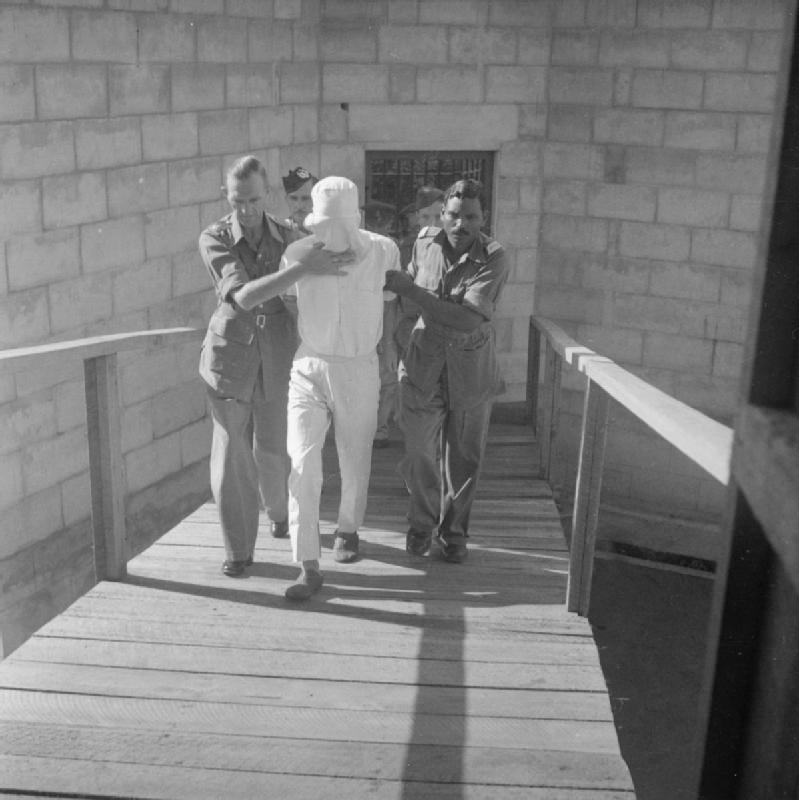
In Singapore, a hooded Lieutenant Nakamura is led to the scaffold after being convicted of beheading an Indian soldier on the Palau Islands, March 1946.

Between 1945 and 1956, the Chinese, Americans, British, Australians, Dutch, French, and Filipinos held trials at forty-nine locations. Australian prosecutors collaborated with British and American courts to hold Japanese individuals accountable, conducting trials for numerous individuals in Amboina, Dutch East Indies, and Rabaul, New Britain. China prosecuted at least 800 individuals, including some linked to the Nanjing massacre, while France and the Netherlands tried several hundred others. The French prosecuted a Japanese civilian in Java for forcing many women into military prostitution, and the Dutch sentenced Japanese individuals to death for murdering local residents and Dutch prisoners. In late 1949, the Soviet Union also put twelve Japanese on trial in Khabarovsk for biological warfare offenses—six were from Unit 731, two from Unit 100, and four from other groups. Later, several hundred Japanese people suspected of war crimes were handed over to the People's Republic of China, where they faced trials in the mid-1950s.

Approximately 4,300 of the 5,379 Japanese, 173 Taiwanese, and 148 Koreans tried as Class B and C war criminals were convicted of conventional crimes, such as rape, murder, violations of the rules of war, and mistreatment of prisoners of war. Hundreds were given life sentences, while nearly 1,000 were given death sentences.

The largest single trial was that of 93 Japanese personnel charged with the summary execution of more than 300 Allied POWs in the Laha massacre (1942). The most prominent ethnic Korean convicted was Lieutenant General Hong Sa Ik, who orchestrated the organisation of prisoner of war camps in Southeast Asia. In 2006, the South Korean government "pardoned" 83 of the 148 convicted Korean war criminals. One hundred-sixty Taiwanese who had served in the forces of the Empire of Japan were convicted of war crimes; 11 were executed.

While German doctors were prosecuted and their crimes made public, U.S. authorities kept details of Japanese human experimentation and biological-chemical warfare hidden, while also granting immunity to many of those responsible, such as Shiro Ishii, mainly as an effort to obtain their data for U.S. chemical weapons programs during the Cold War. In contrast to the immunity given to those involved with Unit 731, the U.S. conducted a tribunal in Yokohama in 1948, where nine Japanese physician professors and medical students were charged with vivisecting captured American pilots. Two professors received death sentences, and the others were sentenced to 15–20 years in prison.

== Post-war events and reactions ==
=== The parole-for-war-criminals movement ===
The British authorities lacked the resources and will to fully commit themselves to pursuing Japanese war criminals.

On 4 September 1952, President Truman issued Executive Order 10393, establishing a Clemency and Parole Board for War Criminals to advise the President with respect to recommendations by the Government of Japan for clemency, reduction of sentence, or parole, with respect to sentences imposed on Japanese war criminals by military tribunals.

On 26 May 1954, Secretary of State John Foster Dulles rejected a proposed amnesty for the imprisoned war criminals but instead agreed to "change the ground rules" by reducing the period required for eligibility for parole from 15 years to 10.

=== Official apologies ===
Several Japanese government officials and former Japanese emperors have acknowledged Japanese war atrocities committed in China. The Japanese government considers that the legal and moral positions in regard to war crimes are separate. Therefore, while maintaining that Japan violated no international law or treaties, Japanese governments have officially recognised the suffering which the Japanese military caused, and numerous apologies have been issued by the Japanese government. For example, Prime Minister Tomiichi Murayama, in August 1995, stated that Japan "through its colonial rule and aggression, caused tremendous damage and suffering to the people of many countries, particularly to those of Asian nations", and he expressed his "feelings of deep remorse" and stated his "heartfelt apology". Also, on 29 September 1972, Japanese Prime Minister Kakuei Tanaka stated: "[t]he Japanese side is keenly conscious of the responsibility for the serious damage that Japan caused in the past to the Chinese people through war, and deeply reproaches itself."

However, apologizes made by Japanese officials have been criticized as insincere. For example, in the Kono Statement, while Japanese officials acknowledge the Japanese military's involvement in the comfort women system, they denied the coercion and forced transportation of the woman and refused to offer compensation to the victims.

The official apologies are widely viewed as inadequate or only a symbolic exchange by many of the survivors of such crimes or the families of dead victims. In October 2006, while Prime Minister Shinzo Abe expressed an apology for the damage caused by its colonial rule and aggression, more than 80 Japanese lawmakers from the ruling Liberal Democratic Party paid visits to the Yasukuni Shrine. Many people aggrieved by Japanese war crimes also maintain that no apology has been issued for particular acts or that the Japanese government has merely expressed "regret" or "remorse". On 2 March 2007, the issue was raised again by Japanese prime minister Shinzō Abe, in which he denied that the military had forced women into sexual slavery during World War II. He stated, "The fact is, there is no evidence to prove there was coercion." Before he spoke, a group of LDP lawmakers also sought to revise the Kono Statement. This provoked negative reaction from Asian and Western countries.

Emperor Showa initiated an official boycott of the Yasukuni Shrine after learning that Class-A war criminals had been covertly enshrined there after the war. This boycott remained in place from 1978 until his death and has been upheld by his successors, Akihito and Naruhito.

On 31 October 2008, the chief of staff of Japan's Air Self-Defense Force Toshio Tamogami was dismissed with a 60 million yen allowance due to an essay he published, arguing that Japan was not an aggressor during World War II, that the war brought prosperity to China, Taiwan, and Korea, that the Imperial Japanese Army's conduct was not violent and that the Greater East Asia War is viewed in a positive way by many Asian countries and criticizing the war crimes trials which followed the war. On 11 November, Tamogami added before the Diet that the personal apology made in 1995 by former prime minister Tomiichi Murayama was "a tool to suppress free speech".

Some in Japan have asserted that what is being demanded is that the Japanese Prime Minister or the Emperor perform dogeza, in which an individual kneels and bows his head to the ground—a high form of apology in East Asian societies that Japan appears unwilling to do. Some point to an act by West German Chancellor Willy Brandt, who knelt at a monument to the Jewish victims of the Warsaw Ghetto, in 1970, as an example of a powerful and effective act of apology and reconciliation similar to dogeza.

On 13 September 2010, Japanese Foreign Minister Katsuya Okada met in Tokyo with six former American POWs of the Japanese and apologized for their treatment during World War II. Okada said: "You have all been through hardships during World War II, being taken prisoner by the Japanese military, and suffered extremely inhumane treatment. On behalf of the Japanese government and as the foreign minister, I would like to offer you my heartfelt apology."

On 29 November 2011, Japanese Foreign Minister Kōichirō Genba apologized to former Australian POWs on behalf of the Japanese government for pain and suffering inflicted on them during the war.

=== Compensation ===
The Japanese government, while admitting no legal responsibility for comfort women, set up the Asian Women's Fund in 1995, which gives money to people who were forced into prostitution during the war. Though the organisation was established by the government, legally, it has been created such that it is an independent charity. The activities of the fund have been controversial in Japan, as well as with international organisations supporting the women concerned.

Some argue that such a fund is part of an ongoing refusal by the Japanese government to face up to its responsibilities, while others say that the Japanese government has long since finalised its responsibility to individual victims and is merely correcting the failures of the victims' own governments. California Congressman Mike Honda, speaking before U.S. House of Representatives on behalf of the women, said that "without a sincere and unequivocal apology from the government of Japan, the majority of surviving Comfort Women refused to accept these funds. In fact, as you will hear today, many Comfort Women returned the Prime Minister's letter of apology accompanying the monetary compensation, saying they felt the apology was artificial and disingenuous."

==== Compensation under the San Francisco Treaty ====
===== Compensation from Japanese overseas assets =====
Japanese overseas assets in 1945
Country/region	Value (1945, ¥15=US$1)	2025 US dollars
North East China	146,532,000,000	$175 billion
Korea	70,256,000,000	$83.8 billion
North China	55,437,000,000	$66.1 billion
Taiwan	42,542,000,000	$50.7 billion
Central South China	36,718,000,000	$43.8 billion
Others	28,014,000,000	$33.4 billion
Total	¥379,499,000,000	$452 billion

"Japanese overseas assets" refers to all assets which were owned by the Japanese government, firms, organizations, and private citizens, in colonized or occupied countries. In accordance with Clause 14 of the San Francisco Treaty, Allied forces confiscated all Japanese overseas assets, except those in China, which were dealt with under Clause 21.

===== Compensation to Allied POWs =====
From January 1944 through Japan's surrender in August 1945, funds intended to aid Allied POWs subjected to forced labor in Japan were routed through the Yokohama Specie Bank. When Yukihisa Fujita of the Democratic Party of Japan questioned the use of POWs by Aso Mining in 2009, the Japanese government stated that it had provided monetary compensation in accordance with the Treaty of San Francisco. Historian Linda Goetz Holmes pointed out that the funds referenced by the government in its statement on 6 February 2009 had been provided from the Yokohama Specie Bank accounts containing the relief money provided by the US, UK, and Netherlands governments during World War II, further stating that the implication Japan's government had released the funding "from its own coffers is disingenuous, to say the least, and factually incorrect."

===== Allied territories occupied by Japan =====
Japanese compensation to countries occupied during 1941–45
Country	Amount in Yen	Amount in US$	2025 US dollars	Date of treaty
Burma	72,000,000,000	200,000,000	$2.4 billion	5 November 1955
Philippines	198,000,000,000	550,000,000	$6.51 billion	9 May 1956
Indonesia	80,388,000,000	223,080,000	$2.49 billion	20 January 1958
South Vietnam	14,400,000,000	38,000,000	$420 million	13 May 1959
Total	¥364,348,800,000	US$1,012,080,000		

Clause 14 of the treaty stated that Japan would enter into negotiations with the Allied nations whose territories were occupied and suffered damage by Japanese forces, with a view to Japan compensating those countries for the damage.

=== Historical negationism and denialism in Japan ===
In numerous historical debates within the region, Japan has been criticized for its failure to adequately address its imperial past. Key issues include the visits of Japanese prime ministers to the contentious Yasukuni Shrine, ongoing denials of state involvement in the system of forced wartime prostitution, efforts to justify the Asia-Pacific War, legal rulings rejecting state compensation for forced labor, and the positive assessments of Japan's colonial period. These issues have periodically strained Japan's relations with its crucial neighbors, particularly the People's Republic of China and the Republic of Korea.

Nippon Kaigi is an influential ultra-right-wing lobby group that wields considerable power in shaping Japanese politics. As of 2015, its membership boasts prominent figures such as former Prime Minister Shinzo Abe, approximately 80% of the cabinet, and nearly half of the country's parliamentarians. This organization is infamous for its historical negationism and denial of certain war crimes The organization denies the Nanjing Massacre, labelling it as exaggerated or fabricated. Historical negationism concerning the comfort women issue has been predominantly led by the Nippon Kaigi since the mid-1990s, with significant efforts notably observed during both the initial and second Abe administration.

Following a Cabinet meeting during Shinzo Abe's initial tenure as prime minister in 2007, the administration said that there was no documented evidence supporting the coerced recruitment of comfort women. This stance was the official position of the administration and is reinforced through collaboration with Japanese right-wing media outlets.

==== Textbook controversy ====
A comparative study begun in 2006 by the Asia–Pacific Research Center at Stanford University on Japanese, Chinese, Korean and United States textbooks describes 99% of Japanese textbooks as having a "muted, neutral, and almost bland" tone and "by no means avoid some of the most controversial wartime moments" like the Nanjing massacre or to a lesser degree the issue of comfort women. The project, led by Stanford scholars Gi-Wook Shin and Daniel Sneider, found that less than one percent of Japanese textbooks used provocative and inflammatory language and imagery, but that these few books, printed by just one publisher, received greater media attention. Moreover, the minority viewpoint of nationalism and revisionism gets more media coverage than the prevailing majority narrative of pacifism in Japan. Chinese and South Korean textbooks were found to be often nationalistic, with Chinese textbooks often blatantly nationalistic and South Korean textbooks focusing on oppressive Japanese colonial rule. United States history textbooks were found to be nationalistic, although they invite debate about major issues.

The existing regulations regarding textbooks grant the government absolute authority to determine which textbooks should be adopted by local schools. School boards, teacher unions, and local citizens, traditionally more left-leaning groups that have opposed government-approved books, have experienced a significant erosion of their autonomy in selecting textbooks, compelling them to adopt government-censored textbooks.

In 1952, the Japanese government instructed Japanese historian Ienaga Saburo to eliminate information and references from his textbook regarding Unit 731, despite having his claims corroborated by other scholars. While Ienaga's legal action against the Japanese government initially compelled them to publish his textbooks detailing Japanese war crimes, the Japanese Supreme Court overturned this decision in 1993. The Supreme Court's 1993 ruling affirmed the government's authority to compel Mr. Ienaga to remove unsettling specifics concerning the Japanese invasions of Manchuria and Korea, as well as the rapes and killings committed by Japanese military personnel during their occupation of East and Southeast Asia.

Textbooks approved for junior high schools in 1997 typically presented relatively high estimates of the number of victims, but those published in 2005 often refrained from providing specific numbers altogether. Similarly, the term "massacre" was largely replaced with the term "incident."

In 2014, the Japanese government attempted to pressure McGraw Hill, an American publishing company, to remove two paragraphs addressing the issue of comfort women from one of their textbooks. McGraw Hill rejected the demands from the Japanese government, and American historians condemned Japan's attempt to alter the historical account of comfort women.

In 2015, other alterations involve six out of seven textbooks reducing the criticism of the Japanese military's role in mass suicides among Okinawans in 1945. Additionally, only one textbook addressed the topic of comfort women.

In 2022, the Japanese government made changes to 14 textbooks covering Japanese and world history. The ministry replaced the words "forced arrest" and "forced conscription" with "mobilization" and "conscription" when recounting the history of forced laborers in Japan, including Koreans during the period of Japanese annexation of Korea from 1910 to 1945.

=== Later investigations ===
As with investigations of Nazi war criminals, official investigations and inquiries are still ongoing. During the 1990s, the South Korean government started investigating some people who had allegedly become wealthy while collaborating with the Japanese military. In South Korea, it is also alleged that during the political climate of the Cold War, many such people or their associates or relatives were able to acquire influence with the wealth they had acquired collaborating with the Japanese and assisted in the covering-up, or non-investigation, of war crimes in order not to incriminate themselves. With the wealth they had amassed during the years of collaboration, they were able to further benefit their families by obtaining higher education for their relatives.

Further evidence has been discovered as a result of these investigations. It has been claimed that the Japanese government intentionally destroyed the reports on Korean comfort women. Some have cited Japanese inventory logs and employee sheets on the battlefield as evidence for this claim. For example, one of the names on the list was of a comfort woman who stated she was forced to be a prostitute by the Japanese. She was classified as a nurse along with at least a dozen other verified comfort women who were not nurses or secretaries. Currently, the South Korean government is looking into the hundreds of other names on these lists.

In 2011, it was alleged in an article published in the Japan Times newspaper by Jason Coskrey that the British government covered up a Japanese massacre of British and Dutch POWs to avoid straining the recently re-opened relationship with Japan, along with their belief that Japan needed to be a post-war bulwark against the spread of communism.

Tamaki Matsuoka's 2009 documentary Torn Memories of Nanjing includes interviews with Japanese veterans who admit to raping and killing Chinese civilians.

In 2018, author Archie Miyamoto published Wartime Military Records on Comfort Women, a compilation of wartime American, Allied, Dutch, and Japanese military documents concerning the comfort women system. The book brings together historical records relating to the recruitment and treatment of women in Japanese military brothels during the Second World War.

=== Concerns of the Japanese imperial family ===
Potentially in contrast to Prime Minister Abe's example of his Yasukuni Shrine visits, by February 2015, some concern within the Imperial House of Japan—which normally does not issue such statements—over the issue was voiced by then-Crown Prince Naruhito, who succeeded his father on 1 May 2019. Naruhito stated on his 55th birthday (23 February 2015) that it was "important to look back on the past humbly and correctly", in reference to Japan's role in World War II-era war crimes, and that he was concerned about the ongoing need to "correctly pass down tragic experiences and the history behind Japan to the generations who have no direct knowledge of the war, at the time memories of the war are about to fade". Two visits to the Yasukuni Shrine in the second half of 2016 by Japan's former foreign minister, Masahiro Imamura, were again followed by controversy that still showed potential for concern over how Japan's World War II history may be remembered by its citizens as it entered the Reiwa era.

Emperor Shōwa upheld an official boycott of Yasukuni Shrine after he discovered that Class-A war criminals had been secretly enshrined after the war. This boycott lasted from 1978 until his death, and his successors, Akihito and Naruhito, have continued the boycott.

== List of major crimes ==
Areas occupied by Japan

- Japanese occupation of the Aleutian islands
- Japanese occupation of the Andaman and Nicobar Islands
- Japanese occupation of Borneo
- Japanese occupation of Burma
- Japanese occupation of Christmas Island
- Japanese occupation of the Dutch East Indies
- Japanese occupation of French Indochina
- Japanese occupation of the Gilbert Islands
- Japanese occupation of Guam
- Japanese occupation of Hong Kong
- Japanese occupation of Malaya
- Japanese occupation of Nauru
- Japanese occupation of New Guinea
- Japanese occupation of the Philippines
- Japanese occupation of Singapore
- Japanese occupation of the Solomon Islands
- Japanese occupation of Wake Island

=== Massacres ===
- Akikaze massacre
- Alexandra Hospital massacre
- Arakan massacres
- Balalae Island mass graves
- Balikpapan massacre
- Bangka Island massacre
- Bataan Death March
- Bulu prison massacre
- Changjiao massacre
- Chaqui'an massacre
- Chichijima massacre
- Dancheon massacre
- Datong mass graves
- De La Salle massacre
- Double Tenth massacre
- Faha massacre
- Fena Massacre
- Gando Massacre
- Hailan River massacre
- Hainan mass graves
- Homfreyganj massacre
- Honam massacres
- Kalagon massacre
- Kamishisuka massacre
- Kantō Massacre
- Laha massacre
- Manila massacre
- March First Movement massacre
- Mili Atoll massacre
- Mizuho massacre
- Mui Wo massacre
- Musha Incident
- Nanjing Massacre
- Nanshitou massacre
- Ocean Island massacre
- Okinawa massacres
- Palawan massacre
- Panjiayu Massacre
- Pantingan River massacre
- Parit Sulong Massacre
- Pingdingshan massacre
- Pontianak massacres
- Port Arthur massacre
- Ration truck massacre
- Sandakan death marches
- Selarang Barracks massacre
- Shinano River massacre
- Shinhanchon massacre
- Sook Ching massacre
- SS Tjisalak massacre
- St. Stephen's College massacre
- Tinta massacre
- Tol Plantation massacre
- Tonghak Peasant Movement massacre
- Ukishima Maru massacre
- Wake Island massacre
- Zhejiang-Jiangxi massacres
- Zhengding Missionary Murder

=== Biological and chemical warfare units ===
- Unit 100
- Unit 516
- Unit 543
- Unit 731
- Unit 1644
- Unit 1855
- Unit 8604
- Unit 9420

=== War crimes ===
- Assassination of Empress Myeongseong
- Attack on Pearl Harbor
- Bombing of Chongqing
- Burma Railway
- Changteh chemical weapon attack
- Comfort women
- Forced labor in Hashima island
- Forced labor in Sado mine
- Forced labor in Imperial Japan
- Hell ships
- Hundred man killing contest
- Japanese atrocities during the annexation of Korea
- Japanese atrocities during the annexation of Taiwan
- Japanization
- Korean Women's Volunteer Labour Corps
- Martyrs of New Guinea
- Niihau incident
- Ningbo plague attack
- Pig-basket atrocity
- Rōmusha
- Seodaemun Prison
- Shanghai gas attacks
- Shūshin koyō
- Three Alls policy
- Torture of German POWs in Tsingtao
- Vietnamese famine of 1944–1945
- War crimes in Manchukuo

== See also ==
- Allied prisoners of war in Japan
- Allied war crimes during World War II
- American cover-up of Japanese war crimes
- Anti-Japanese sentiment
- Controversies surrounding the rising sun flag
- Controversies surrounding Yasukuni Shrine
- Dissent in the Armed Forces of the Empire of Japan
- Eugenics in Japan
- Fascism in Japan
- German war crimes
- Greater East Asia Co-Prosperity Sphere
- Hirohito's accountability for Japanese war crimes
- Human rights in Japan
- Italian war crimes
- Japan during World War II
- Japanese militarism
- Japanese nationalism
- Japanese settlers in Manchuria
- Japanese War Crimes: Murder Under the Sun, a historical film about Japanese war crimes
- List of concentration and internment camps in Japan
- List of Japanese-run internment camps during World War II
- List of war crimes in World War II
- Men Behind the Sun, a historical film about Unit 731
- Military history of Japan
- Nanjing Massacre denial, a form of genocide denial
- Political extremism in Japan
- Racism in Asia
  - Racism in Japan
- Taiwanese resistance to Japanese colonialism
- Tanaka Memorial
- The Rape of Nanking, a 1997 book about the Nanjing Massacre which was written by Iris Chang
- War crimes in World War II
- World War II casualties

== Sources ==
- "A life haunted by WWII surgical killings". The Brunei Times. Agence France-Presse. 31 October 2007. Archived from the original on 13 December 2014.
- "Japanese veteran haunted by WWII surgical killings". Agence France-Presse. 28 October 2007. Archived from the original on 17 March 2014.
- Borneman, John. "Can Public Apologies Contribute to Peace? An Argument for Retribution" (PDF). Cornell University. Archived from the original (PDF) on 24 August 2006.
- Bix, Herbert. Hirohito and the Making of Modern Japan. New York: HarperCollins, 2000.
- Naval History And Heritage Command. "Comfort". Dictionary of American Naval Fighting Ships. Naval History And Heritage Command. Archived from the original on 13 October 2013.
- Cook, Haruko Taya; Cook, Theodore F. (1993). Japan at War: An Oral History. New Press. ISBN 1-56584-039-9.- Compilation of interviews with Japanese survivors of World War II, including several who describe war crimes that they were involved with.
- Chalmers, Johnson (20 November 2003). "The Looting of Asia". London Review of Books. Archived from the original on 19 November 2003.
- De Jong, Louis (2002). The collapse of a colonial society. The Dutch in Indonesia during the Second World War. Verhandelingen van het Koninklijk Instituut voor Taal-, Land- en Volkenkunde 206. translation J. Kilian, C. Kist and J. Rudge, introduction J. Kemperman. Leiden, The Netherlands: KITLV Press. ISBN 90-6718-203-6.
- Dower, John W. Embracing Defeat: Japan in the Wake of World War II. New York: New Press, 1999.
- Felton, Mark. Japan's Gestapo: Murder, Mayhem and Torture in Wartime Asia (Casemate Publishers, 2009).
- Felton, Mark. Slaughter at Sea: The Story of Japan's Naval War Crimes (Casemate Publishers, 2007).
- Felton, Mark. "The Perfect Storm: Japanese military brutality during World War Two." The Routledge History of Genocide (Routledge, 2015) pages 105–121.
- Fields, Liz. "South Korean Comfort Women Threaten to Sue Japan for $20 Million in the U.S". Archived from the original on 19 August 2018.
- "Forive but Never Forget". GSBC. Archived from the original on 22 April 2024.
- L, Klemen (1999–2000). "Massacres of POWs, Dutch East Indies, 1941–1942". Forgotten Campaign: The Dutch East Indies Campaign 1941–1942. Archived from the original on 19 September 2011.
- Landas, Wiley (2004). The Fallen A True Story of American POWs and Japanese Wartime Atrocities. Hoboken: John Wiley. ISBN 0-471-42119-7.
- Legault, Barbara; Prescott, John F. (2009). "'The arch agitator:' Dr. Frank W. Schofield and the Korean independence movement". The Canadian Veterinary Journal. 50 (8): 865–72. PMC 2711476. PMID 19881928.
- McCurry, Justin. "Japanese PM Shinzo Abe Stops Short of New Apology in War Anniversary Speech". Archived from the original on 28 January 2020.
- Noh, Jooeun. "The Great Kantō Earthquake". Harvard-Yenching Institute. Archived from the original on 28 January 2020.
- Ozawa, Harumi (6 November 2007). "Japanese war veteran speaks of atrocities in the Philippines". Taipei Times. p. 9. Archived from the original on 20 August 2019.
- Parry, Richard Lloyd (26 February 2007). "Dissect them alive: chilling Imperial that order could not be disobeyed". The Australian. Archived from the original on 14 February 2015.
  Parry, Richard Lloyd (25 February 2007). "Dissect them alive: order not to be disobeyed". The Times. Archived from the original on 1 January 2013.
  Parry, Richard Lloyd (25 February 2007). "Dissect them alive: order not to be disobeyed". The Times. Archived from the original on 28 February 2007.
  Richard Lloyd Parry (25 February 2007). "Dissect them alive: order not to be disobeyed". The Times. Archived from the original on 23 May 2011.
- Ramsey, Edwin, and Stephen Rivele. (1990). Lieutenant Ramsey's War. Knightsbridge Publishing Co., New York. ASIN: B000IC3PDE
- Schmidt, Larry. (1982). American Involvement in the Filipino Resistance on Mindanao During the Japanese Occupation, 1942–1945. (PDF). M.S. Thesis. U.S. Army Command and General Staff College. 274 pages.
- Takai, Kōji; Sakaida, Henry (2001). B-29 Hunters of the JAAF. Aviation Elite Units. Oxford: Osprey Publishing. ISBN 1-84176-161-3.
- Tanaka, Yuki (1996). Hidden Horrors. Westview press.
- Tanaka, Yuki (October 1988). "Poison Gas, the Story Japan Would Like to Forget". Bulletin of the Atomic Scientists. 44 (8): 10. Bibcode:1988BuAtS..44h..10T. doi:10.1080/00963402.1988.11456210.
- The Knights of Bushido: A Short History of Japanese War Crimes. Greenhill Books. 2006. ISBN 1-85367-651-9.
- Cheung, Raymond. OSPREY AIRCRAFT OF THE ACES 126: Aces of the Republic of China Air Force. Oxford: Osprey Publishing, 2015. ISBN 978 14728 05614.
- Tillman, Barrett (2010). Whirlwind: The Air War Against Japan 1942–1945. New York City: Simon & Schuster. ISBN 978-1-4165-8440-7.
- Sissons, D. C. S. The Australian War Crimes Trials and Investigations 1942–51 (PDF). Archived (PDF) from the original on 17 August 2019.
- "Wartime Cabinet Document Discloses Conscription of 290,000 Koreans in 1944". The People's Korea. Archived from the original on 13 April 2016.
