= Yoshimura Hisato =

Japanese medical researcher and alleged war criminal

- 吉村 寿人
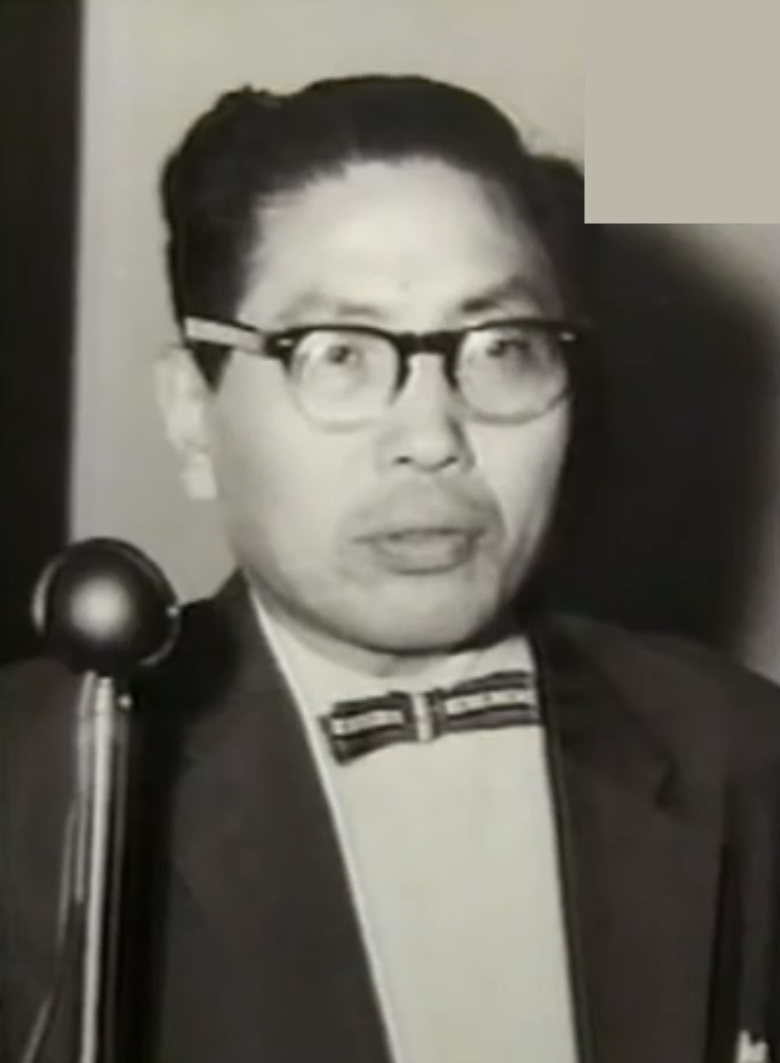
- Born: February 9, 1907; Hyōgo Prefecture
- Died: November 29, 1990 (aged 83)
- Occupation: Medical researcher
- Known for: membership in Unit 731 and participating in war crimes, research on human environmental adaptation

Yoshimura Hisato (Japanese: 吉村 寿人; February 9, 1907 – November 29, 1990) was a Japanese medical scientist and physiologist who served as a member of Unit 731, a biological warfare unit of the Imperial Japanese Army, during World War II and conducted experiments on prisoners of war and civilians in Manchukuo, Northeast China. He later served in several capacities for Japanese research organizations.

== Early life and education ==
Yoshimura was born in 1907 in the Japanese prefecture of Hyōgo. From 1926 to 1930 he studied medicine at the University of Kyoto where he became a research assistant of physiologist Rinnosuke Shoji after graduation. He received his doctoral degree in 1936.

== Involvement in Unit 731 ==
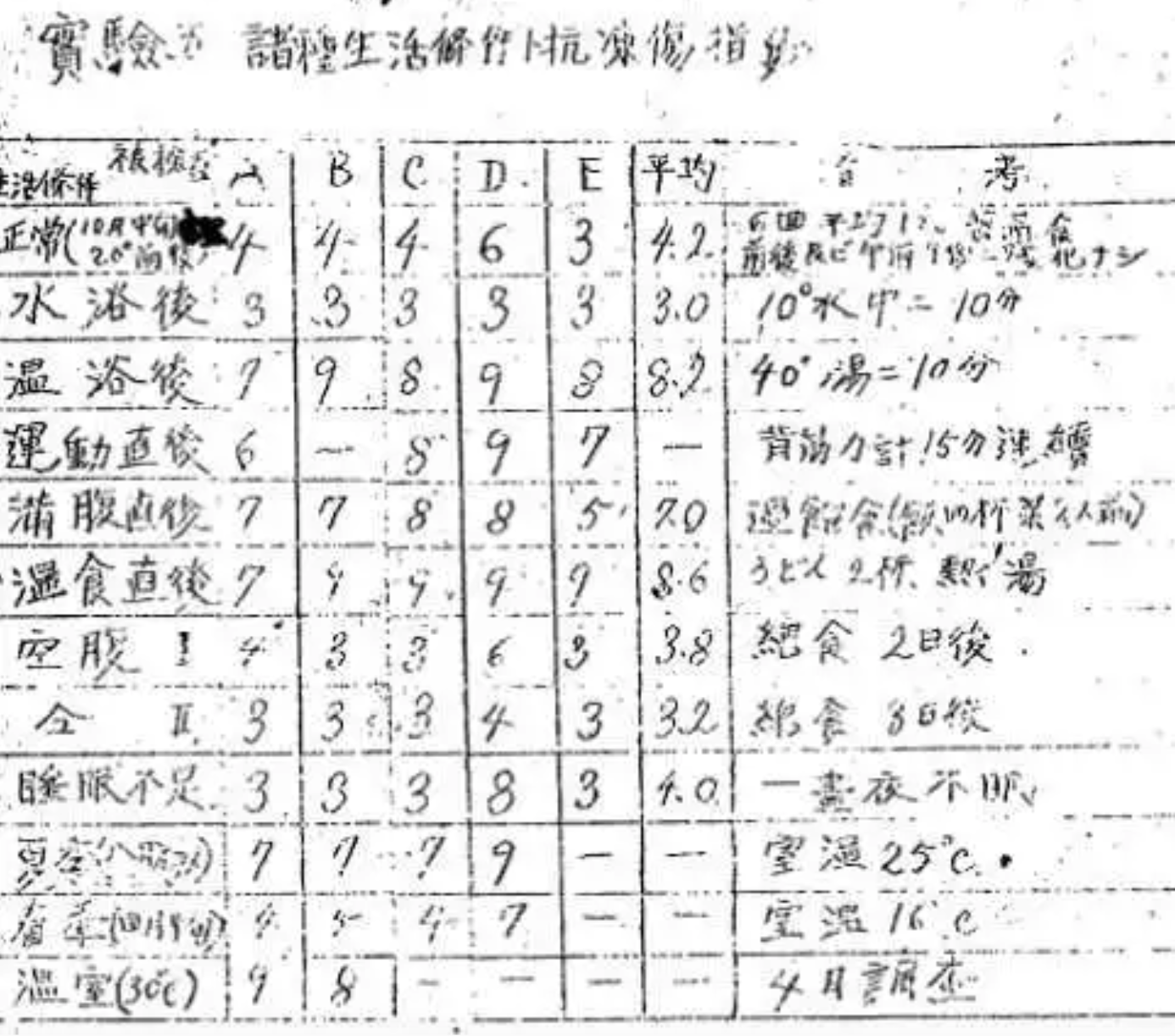
Scan of Yoshimura Hisato's Frostbite Research Data, 1941

On Shoji's recommendation, Yoshimura joined Unit 731 in Harbin in 1938 as a technician to work in the newly established frostbite laboratory where he stayed until the end of the war in 1945. Harbin was located in Manchukuo, a puppet state controlled by Japan that had been established in 1932 in Northern China. Unit 731 ran an extensive facility there to develop biological warfare agents and conduct related research that involved experimentation on live humans. It was part of the Epidemic Prevention and Water Purification Department, a branch of the Imperial Japanese Army that conducted combat-relevant scientific research across the battle grounds of the Pacific War and ran several labs across the occupied Chinese territories.

Yoshimura later ran his own frostbite experiments at the Harbin lab where prisoners of war, criminals, and civilians from nearby villages were used as test subjects. The experiments were extremely brutal and included forced mutilation without sedatives. All of the test subjects of the Harbin facility died as a consequence of the experiments or were killed by the military unit of the facility afterwards.

== After World War II ==
As did many other staff members of the Unit 731 site in Harbin, Yoshimura returned to Japan and did not have to stand trial due to an immunity deal in return for full disclosure of the research results to the United States government. However, during the 1949 Khabarovsk trials witnesses described the nature and extent of the experiments conducted by Yoshimura in detail. Yoshimura presented results of the experiments during a lecture in Kyoto in 1941 and even published a series of articles about it in 1951 and 1952 but neither reflected the conditions under which the results were obtained. The provided information, however, does not conceal the fact that the experiments were unethical.

The claim that Japan had conducted large-scale experimentation on living human beings during World War II was disregarded by the West as communist propaganda until the 1980s. Witnesses speaking publicly about their experiences such as Ken Yuasa were discredited and threatened into silence by Japanese ultranationalists. Therefore Yoshimura did not face any repercussions. He later became a professor at Hyogo Prefectural Medical University. From 1967 to 1969 he was President of Kyoto Prefectural University of Medicine. In 1978, he received the "Order of the Rising Sun-Third Class for pioneering work in 'environmental adaptation science'" by Emperor Hirohito.

== Literature ==
- "Asia's Auschwitz". The Sydney Morning Herald. December 17, 1994.
- Bärnighausen, Till: "Data Generated in Japan's Biowarfare Experiments on Human Victims in China, 1932-1945, and the Ethics of Using Them." In: Nie, Jing Bao et al. (eds.): Japan's Wartime Medical Atrocities. Comparative Inquiries in Science, History, and Ethics, Routledge, 2010, pp. pp. 80- 106.
- Tsuchiya, Takashi: "The Imperial Japanese Experiments in China", in: Emanuel, Ezekiel J. et al. (eds.), The Oxford Textbook of Clinical Research Ethics, Oxford University Press 2008, pp. 31-45.
- Yan-Jun, Yang and Yue-Him, Tam: Laboratory of the Devil, Auschwitz of the East, Fonthill Media, 2018.
