= Hideo Shimizu (soldier) =

Former youth member of Unit 731 (born 1930)

- 清水 英男
- Born: July 1930 (age 96); Miyada, Nagano, Japan
- Military career
- Allegiance: Empire of Japan
- Branch: Imperial Japanese Army
- Service years: March–August 1945
- Rank: Technical trainee
- Unit: Unit 731
- Known for: One of the last surviving members of Unit 731, and one of the only members to publicly apologise
- Conflicts: Second Sino-Japanese War; World War II
- Other work: Architect

Hideo Shimizu (清水 英男, Shimizu Hideo; born July 1930) is a former technical trainee in the Imperial Japanese Army and one of the last surviving members of Unit 731, Imperial Japan's biological and chemical warfare unit.

== Service in Unit 731 ==
The Unit 731 complex

Hideo Shimizu (center) in 1945

In March 1945, when Hideo Shimizu was 14, three days after he had graduated from higher elementary school, he was approached by one of his teachers who was asking students who liked arts and crafts whether they wanted to go to China for a job. Shimizu assumed it was a role in a military factory and went, he was one of the last teenage recruits in the unit along with five others who went with him. They survived a US air raid on their journey. He was sent to Pingfang district, Harbin in Manchukuo as a technical trainee. He was tasked with extracting plague bacteria from rats, this bacteria was then used on people. One time he got a bad fever and Shimizu claims they wanted to operate on him, but he was given a shot by a male nurse with the same surname as him that helped cure him. He also claims he heard rumours of boys in the unit being dissected whilst being alive. In the morning of the 12 August 1945, he was ordered to collect bones of the prisoners and put them in a bag, he counted at least 30 to 100 charred bodies, later in the day he received orders to transport explosives and destroy evidence regarding the Unit and their experiments. On the 14 of the same month he fled Manchuria along with other retreating Japanese troops. He had spent a total of four and a half months in the unit and witnessed formaldehyde filled jars of people including a cut open pregnant woman, infants and human organs. He recalls seeing wills written using blood on the cell walls.

== Later life and advocacy ==
After his return to Japan he worked for his family's construction business as an architect. He started a family and concealed his membership of the unit from everyone including his wife and family for 70 years. He was warned by old members of the unit to not pursue medical professions. He was also ordered to never speak about the unit, and to never contact other members. In August 2015, he publicly revealed his membership at the Shinshu war exhibition for peace in Iida and travelled to Harbin in 2024 to apologise for his actions and the actions of the unit. He has received backlash and hate from Japanese nationalists and atrocity deniers who have called Shimizu a 'senile old man' and 'public nuisance'. Shimizu responded to the backlash stating:

They don’t know what horrible things Japan did to people in another country...No matter what people say to me, I must keep telling the truth, otherwise future generations will be deprived of a chance to learn about it

His family including his daughters have severed ties with him after he revealed the crimes of Unit 731. In recent years he has campaigned for greater acceptance and understanding of Japan's war crimes during WW2.
