= Zhongma Fortress =

Japanese army prison camp

Zhongma Fortress (Chinese: 中馬城) — also Zhong Ma Prison Camp or Unit Tōgō — was a prison camp where the Japanese Kwantung Army carried out covert biological warfare research on human test subjects. Built in Beiyinhe, outside of Harbin, Manchukuo during the Second Sino-Japanese War, the camp served as a center for human subject experimentation and could hold up to 1,000 prisoners at any given time. In 1937 the prison camp was destroyed and testing operations were transferred to Pingfang under Unit 731.

== Background ==
In 1930 Doctor Shirō Ishii, an Imperial Japanese Army researcher in biological and chemical warfare, petitioned the Japanese War Ministry to establish a biological weapons program. With the support of Army Minister Sadao Araki and the dean of the Tokyo Army Medical College, Koizumi Chikahiko, a biological weapons program was initiated under a newly formed department of immunology. Ishii began his research in biological warfare as the head of the "Epidemic Prevention Research Laboratory." Although protecting Japanese troops from disease was part of the agenda, the laboratory's primary objective was to develop an effective means to spread epidemics. Encouraged by preliminary results with lab animals, Ishii sought to replicate these outcomes with human trials. Due to containment issues and ethical constraints, human experimentation could not be conducted in his laboratory in Tokyo.

In 1932 the Japanese Imperial Army invaded Manchuria following the Manchurian Incident. The subsequent occupation of Manchuria provided an environment conducive to Ishii's research as human test subjects "could be plucked from the streets like rats." Ishii relocated his laboratory to a military facility near Harbin. However, the facility's highly populated surroundings threatened to compromise the secrecy of the ongoing human experimentation. Consequently, a second site, about 100 kilometers to the south of Harbin at the village of Beiyinhe, was selected. Beiyinhe was a diffuse village of about 300 homes known to the local populace as Zhong Ma City. The Imperial Japanese Army cleared out the local inhabitants and burnt down the village, except for a large building suitable for use as a headquarters.

== Description ==
The prison camp had three-metre-high (9.8 ft) earthen walls topped with electrified barbed wire and a moat with drawbridge surrounded the buildings within. There were hundreds of rooms and smaller surrounding laboratories, office buildings, barracks and dining facilities, warehouses and munitions storage, crematoria, and the prison cells. The Japanese Imperial Army conscripted local Chinese labor for the construction. Due to secrecy, laborers were escorted by armed guards and forced to wear blinders so they could not figure out what they were constructing. Those who worked on the most sensitive areas of the prison camp, such as the inner section of medical laboratories within the prisoners' quarters, were executed once construction was complete to ensure secrecy. The prisoners brought to Zhongma included common criminals, captured bandits, anti-Japanese partisans, as well as political prisoners and people rounded up on trumped up charges by the Kempeitai.

=== Human experimentation ===
A variety of medical experiments were conducted on the prisoners within the camp. Prisoners were generally well fed on the usual diet of rice or wheat, meat, fish, and occasionally even alcohol, with the intent of keeping prisoners in their normal state of health at the beginning of experiments. In many cases, prisoners were drained of blood over several days, with careful records kept on their deteriorating physical condition. Others were subject to experiments on nutrient or water deprivation. Prisoners were also injected with microbes and plague bacteria. Data sheets reveal that in at least one case, after prisoners developed a fever of 104 °F (40 °C), they were vivisected while unconscious.

The average life expectancy of a prisoner at the camp was one month. Prisoners who survived the experiments, but who were deemed too weak for further tests, were killed. The facility was estimated to have held between 500-600 prisoners at any one time, with a capacity for over 1000.

=== Closure ===
In August 1934, at the time of the traditional summer festival, the prisoners were given a ration of special foods. One prisoner, named Li, managed to overpower his guard, seize the keys and freed about forty of his fellow prisoners. Although their legs were shackled, their arms were free, and the prisoners were able to climb the outside walls. A heavy downpour had knocked out the facility's electricity, deactivating the searchlights and electric fence. Some ten of the escapees were shot by guards while others were recaptured and subjected to sadistic treatment as reprisal, but roughly sixteen managed to escape. Some of the men soon died from exposure, hunger, cold, and the injuries from their experiments but several managed to survive, and spread word of the crimes against humanity being conducted by Shiro and his subordinates. Although the Kuomintang took no notice of these reports, Zhongma Fortress was closed down due to the significant publicity, and its activities transferred to a new site closer to Harbin called Pingfang (Heibo), which came to be known as Unit 731. The testimony of one of the escapees, Ziyang Wang, was collected by Xiao Han, deputy director of the Pingfang museum, in the 1980s.

The graphic novel Maruta 454 (2010), by Paul-Yanic Laquerre, Song Yang and Pastor, depicts the escape of 12 Chinese prisoners from Unit Tōgō, based on Wang's testimony.
