= Akira Makino =

Imperial Japanese medic

Akira Makino (牧野 明, Makino Akira) (November 1922 – May 2007) was a former medic in the Imperial Japanese Navy who, in 2006, became the first Japanese ex-soldier to admit to the experiments conducted on human beings in the Philippines during World War II.

== Early life ==
Makino was born in 1922, in a small town in Osaka Prefecture. At the start of World War II, he was assigned to the navy's No. 33 patrol. In August 1944, at the age of 22, he was transferred to an air base in Zamboanga on Mindanao Island, in the Philippines.

== Human experiments ==
According to Makino, experimentation on about 30 prisoners was carried out between December 1944 and February 1945. The prisoners were mostly Moro Muslims, and included women and children, as well as two Filipino men suspected of spying for the United States. Makino performed operations on these prisoners including amputations, abdominal vivisections and other experiments. In his interview with the Kyodo News Agency, he described, in particular, his experience with the two Filipino men suspected of spying. He said he sedated the men by placing ether-soaked cloth over their mouths, and then was instructed to study their livers after making an incision with a surgical knife. Makino stated that, at the time, he thought it was a "horrible" thing that he was doing, but that he was too scared to refuse orders because he would have been killed for disobedience.

== Revelation ==
After remaining silent for decades, Makino revealed details to the public in 2006. Makino's account is one of only a few from Japanese veterans concerning human experimentation in Southeast Asia during World War II. Initially he faced severe opposition from his wartime friends. In his revelation, Makino said, "We should not repeat such miseries again. I want to tell the truth about the war, even if it is to only one person or two."

== See also ==
- Japanese war crimes
- Ken Yuasa
- Unit 731
- South-East Asian theatre of World War II
- Military history of the Philippines during World War II
