= Shunji Sato =

Japanese officer, war criminal 1896-1977

Shunji Satō
- 佐藤 俊二
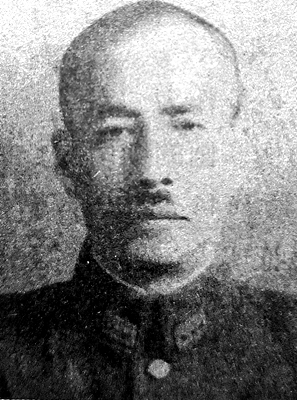
- Born: September 12, 1896; Toyohashi, Aichi, Japan
- Died: January 2, 1977 (aged 80)
- Status: Deceased
- Conviction: War crimes
- Trial: Khabarovsk war crimes trials
- Penalty: 20 years imprisonment with hard labor
- Military career
- Allegiance: Empire of Japan
- Branch: Imperial Japanese Army
- Rank: Major General
- Conflicts: World War II

Shunji Satō (佐藤 俊二, Satō Shinji; September 12, 1896 – January 2, 1977) was a Japanese physician during the first half of the 20th century, a major general in the Imperial Japanese Army, and a convicted war criminal.

== Biography ==
Satō was a native of the city of Toyohashi in Aichi Prefecture.

From January 1941 he was a department head within the Epidemic Prevention and Water Purification Department under the Japanese Central China Area Army. While the public mission of this department was to prevent the spread of disease and monitor water supply, it was also assigned the mission of manufacturing and testing biological weapons. In August, he was promoted to colonel and from November 1941 commanded Unit 8604 of the Japanese Southern China Area Army, a biological warfare unit that operated in southern China. From March 1944, he was reassigned as Chief of Medical Service of the IJA 5th Army based in Manchukuo. He was promoted to major general in June 1945.

Captured by the Red Army during the Soviet invasion of Manchuria, he was accused of war crimes and sentenced to 20 years' incarceration in the Khabarovsk War Crime Trials. However, in 1956, with the restoration of diplomatic relations between Japan and the Soviet Union, he was repatriated to Japan. He died in 1977.
