= Unit 100 =

Secret Imperial Japanese Army unit

Unit 100 (第百部隊, dai-hyaku butai) was an Imperial Japanese Army facility called the Kwantung Army Warhorse Disease Prevention Shop that focused on the development of biological weapons during World War II. It was operated by the Kempeitai, the Japanese military police. Its headquarters was located in Mokotan, Manchukuo, a village just south of the city of Changchun. It had branches in Dairen and Hailar. The Hailar branch was later transferred to Foshan. Between 600 and 800 people worked at Unit 100.

The Unit focused on plant and animal biological warfare, producing and deploying livestock and crop viruses in China. The Unit was led by Wakamatsu Yujiro. Unit 100 would cooperate with Unit 731 when necessary.

== Establishment ==
Unit 100 was established by imperial decree in 1936, officially as a unit to treat diseases affecting horses and other animals used by the Kwantung Army. However, the actual purpose of the unit was to conduct research on plant and animal bioweapons useful for sabotage. Wakamatsu Yujiro was placed in charge of the unit, which he led until 1945.

Land for the construction of Unit 100's facilities was seized by local officials and sold to the Japanese. The area encompassed approximately 20 square kilometers, much of which was occupied by an experimental farm. Conscripted Chinese laborers were used to build a large network of buildings in a short period of time. Unit 100 started operations in 1936 after the first buildings at the facility were completed.

== Organization ==
Unit 100 consisted of five divisions further divided into sections:

1. General division (concerned with design and overall research problems, managed the unit's experimental crop farm)
  - Planning section
  - Research section
2. First division (conducted blood tests on research animals to determine the presence of diseases)
  Divided into several sections
3. Second division
  1. Bacteriological section
  2. Pathological section
  3. Animal experimentation section
  4. Organic chemistry section
  5. Botanical and plant pathology section (conducted research on infecting plants with bacteria)
  6. Preparations for bacteriological warfare section (established later, in 1943)
4. Third division
5. Fourth division

The third and fourth division's role was to assist the second division.

== Mission ==
The main purpose of Unit 100 was to conduct research about diseases originating from animals. As most armies were still heavily dependent on horses, the Imperial Japanese Army hoped to find ways to kill them and therefore to weaken military power. Furthermore, they hoped to spread disease via animal carriers. To this end, former members claim that experiments were also conducted with human beings. In practice, Unit 731 was the group tasked with developing biological weapons against humans. Although smaller than Unit 731, Unit 100 was still a large organization. Its annual bacteria production capacity was projected to reach 1,000 kg of anthrax, 500 kg of glanders, and 100 kg of red rust (fungus). The goal was never reached, due to equipment shortages.

Senior Sgt. Kazuo Mitomo described some of Unit 100's human experiments:

"I put as much as a gram of heroin into some porridge and gave this porridge to an arrested Chinese citizen who ate it; about 20 minutes later he lost consciousness and remained in that state until he died 15-16 hours later. We knew that such a dose of heroin is fatal, but it did not make any difference to us whether he died or lived. On some of the prisoners I experimented 5-6 times, testing the action of Korean bindweed, bactal and castor oil seeds. One of the prisoners of Russian nationality became so exhausted from the experiments that no more could be performed on him, and Matsui ordered me to kill that Russian by giving him an injection of potassium cyanide. After the injection, the man died at once. Bodies were buried in the unit's cattle cemetery."

Unit chief Yujiro Wakamatsu ordered Hirazakura to purchase hundreds of cattle and put them to pasture along the Siberian border north-east of Hailar, ready to be infected by airborne dispersion. It was hoped that in the event of a Soviet invasion these infected livestock would mingle with local herds to cause epidemics and to destroy food supplies.

Unit 100 staff poisoned and drugged Russians, Chinese and Koreans with heroin, castor oil, tobacco and other substances for weeks at a time. Some died during the experimentation. When survivors were determined to no longer be useful for experimentation and were complaining of illness, staff told them they would receive a shot of medicine, but instead executed them with potassium cyanide injections. Executions were also carried out by gunshots.

== Members ==
- Otozō Yamada, Direct controller, 1944-1945
- Lieutenant General Takahashi, Chief of the Veterinary Administration of the Kwantung Army
- Hirazakura Zensaku, officer of the 1st and 2nd division from July 1942 to December 1943. Was in the 6th division from December 1943 until April 1944. He was then at Unit 543 until the end of the war.
- Fukuzumi Mitsuyoshi, doctor
- Sakurashita Kiyoshi, civilian employee
- Hataki Akira, civilian employee
- Wakamatsu, Major General of the Veterinary Service

== Biological warfare agents ==
The following potential agents were tested:

- Yersinia pestis, which causes plague
- Burkholderia mallei, which causes Glanders in horses: Kuwabara gave testimony after World War II that Unit 100 released horses infected with Glanders.
- Bacillus anthracis, which causes anthrax

== See also ==
- Japanese war crimes
  - Unit 731
- Second Sino-Japanese War
  - Kwantung Army
