= Khabarovsk war crimes trials =

1949 Soviet hearings of Japanese bacteriological warfare

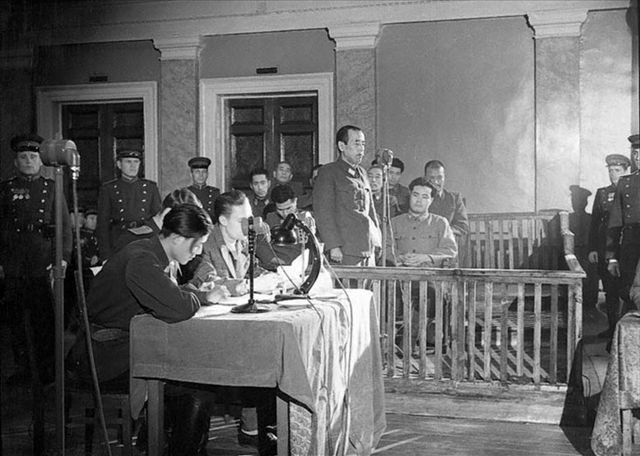
A Japanese army officer on trial, Khabarovsk, Russia, 1949

The Khabarovsk war crimes trials were the Soviet hearings of twelve Japanese Kwantung Army officers and medical staff charged with the manufacture and use of biological weapons, and human experimentation, during World War II. The war crimes trials were held between 25 and 31 December 1949 in the Soviet industrial city of Khabarovsk in the Russian Far East.

The Soviet Union and the United States gathered data and evidence from the Unit after the fall of Japan. While twelve Unit 731 researchers arrested by Soviet forces were tried at the December 1949 Khabarovsk war crimes trials, they were sentenced only to the Siberian labor camp from 2 to 25 years, seemingly in exchange for the information they held. Those captured by the US military were secretly given immunity, while being covered up with stipends to the perpetrators. The US was purported to have co-opted the researchers' bioweapons information and experience for use in their own warfare program (resembling Operation Paperclip), and so did the Soviet Union in building their bioweapons facility in Sverdlovsk using documentation captured from the Unit in Manchuria. In 1956, those still serving their sentences were released and repatriated to Japan.

== History ==
During the trials, the accused, including Major General Kiyoshi Kawashima, testified that as early as 1941, some 40 members of Unit 731 air-dropped plague-contaminated fleas on Changde, China, causing epidemic plague outbreaks.

Judges found all twelve accused war criminals guilty, sentencing them to terms ranging from two to twenty-five years in labour camps. In 1956, those still serving their sentences were released and repatriated to Japan.

In 1950, the Soviet Union published official trial materials in English, titled Materials on the Trial of Former Servicemen of the Japanese Army Charged with Manufacturing and Employing Bacteriological Weapons. These included documents from the preliminary investigation (the indictment, some of the documentary evidence, and some interrogation records), testimony from both the accused and witnesses, final pleas of the accused, some expert findings, and speeches from the state prosecutor and defense counsel, verbatim. Published by state-run Foreign Languages Publishing House, the Soviet publication has long been out of print. But in November 2015, Google Books determined it was now in the public domain and published a facsimile of it online, also offering it for sale as an ebook.

== Analysis ==
Speaking to the overall judicial integrity of the proceedings, bioethics expert Jing-Bao Nie said the following:

Despite its strong ideological tone and many obvious shortcomings such as the lack of international participation, the trial established beyond reasonable doubt that the Japanese army had prepared and deployed bacteriological weapons and that Japanese researchers had conducted cruel experiments on living human beings. However, the trial, together with the evidence presented to the court and its major findings—which have proved remarkably accurate—was dismissed as communist propaganda and totally ignored in the West until the 1980s.

Historian Sheldon Harris described the trial in his history of Unit 731:

Evidence introduced during the hearings was based on eighteen volumes of interrogations and documentary material gathered in investigations over the previous four years. Some of the volumes included more than four hundred pages of depositions.... Unlike the Moscow Show Trials of the 1930s, the Japanese confessions made in the Khabarovsk trial were based on fact and not the fantasy of their handlers.

Yet the very wealth of trial documentation that tended to confirm that the Khabarovsk proceedings were no mere show trial also led Harris to question the relatively light punishment meted out there. All of the defendants (aside from one who died in prison and another who committed suicide) had been freed by 1956, a mere seven years after the trial took place. Chief trial translator Georgy Permyakov alleged that Soviet leader Joseph Stalin may have initially feared that Japan would execute Soviet prisoners of war if the Khabarovsk defendants were hanged. But Harris also claimed that "the Soviets made a deal with the Japanese similar to the one completed by the Americans: Information [in exchange] for... extremely light sentences":

The Soviets and their successors never released the interrogation reports of the Japanese, some 18 volumes. This leads me to believe that the Japanese did arrange a deal, did yield some information, and the Soviets settled for the best goodies they could get.

Harris also noted other issues unleashed by the trial, which linked emperor Hirohito to the Japanese biological warfare program, as well as allegations that Japanese biological warfare experiments had also been conducted on Allied prisoners of war.

One of the experts called upon by Soviet prosecutors during the trial, N. N. Zhukov-Verezhnikov, later served on the panel of scientists, led by Joseph Needham, investigating Chinese and North Korean allegations of US biological warfare in the Korean War.

== Accused and their sentences ==
- 25 years imprisonment:
  - General Otozō Yamada (born 1881), former Commander-in-Chief of the Kwantung Army (released from prison in 1956)
  - Lieutenant General Kajitsuka Ryuji (born 1888), former Chief of Medical Administration (released from prison in 1956)
  - Lieutenant General Takahashi Takaatsu (born 1888), former Chief of Veterinary Service (died in prison in 1951)
  - Major General Kawashima Kiyoshi (born 1893), former Chief of Unit 731 (released from prison in 1956)
- 20 years imprisonment:
  - Major General Sato Shunji (born 1896), former Chief of Medical Service, 5th Army (released from prison in 1956)
  - Major Karasawa Tomio (born 1911), former chief of a section of Unit 731 (killed himself in prison in 1956)
- 18 years imprisonment:
  - Lieutenant Colonel Nishi Toshihide (born 1904), former chief of a division of Unit 731 (released from prison in 1956)
- 15 years imprisonment:
  - Senior Sergeant Mitomo Kazuo (born 1924), former member of Unit 100 (released from prison in 1956)
- 12 years imprisonment:
  - Major Onoue Masao (born 1910), former chief of a branch of Unit 731 (released from prison in 1956)
- 10 years imprisonment:
  - Lieutenant Hirazakura Zensaku (born 1916), former researcher of Unit 100 (released from prison in 1956)
- 3 years imprisonment:
  - Kurushima Yuji (born 1923), former lab orderly of Branch 162 of Unit 731 (released in 1952)
- 2 years imprisonment:
  - Corporal Kikuchi Norimitsu (born 1922), former medical orderly of Branch 643 of Unit 731 (released in 1951)

== See also ==
- Japanese war crimes
- International Military Tribunal for the Far East
- Military history of the Soviet Union
- Nuremberg Trials
