= Defoliation bacilli bomb =

Biological weapon

Defoliation bacilli bombs, made between 1932 and 1933, were used by the Imperial Japanese Army to spread bubonic plague across China. The deployment of these lethal munitions provided the Japanese with the ability to launch devastating biological attacks, infecting agriculture, reservoirs, wells and populated areas with anthrax, plague-infected fleas, typhoid, dysentery and cholera. The alumni of Unit 731, the unit that prepared these weapons, became top bioweapons researchers and were not prosecuted as war criminals.
