= Unit 8604 =

Unit of Imperial Japanese Army

- Japanese: 波8604部隊, romanized: Nami Hachi-roku-rei-yon Butai
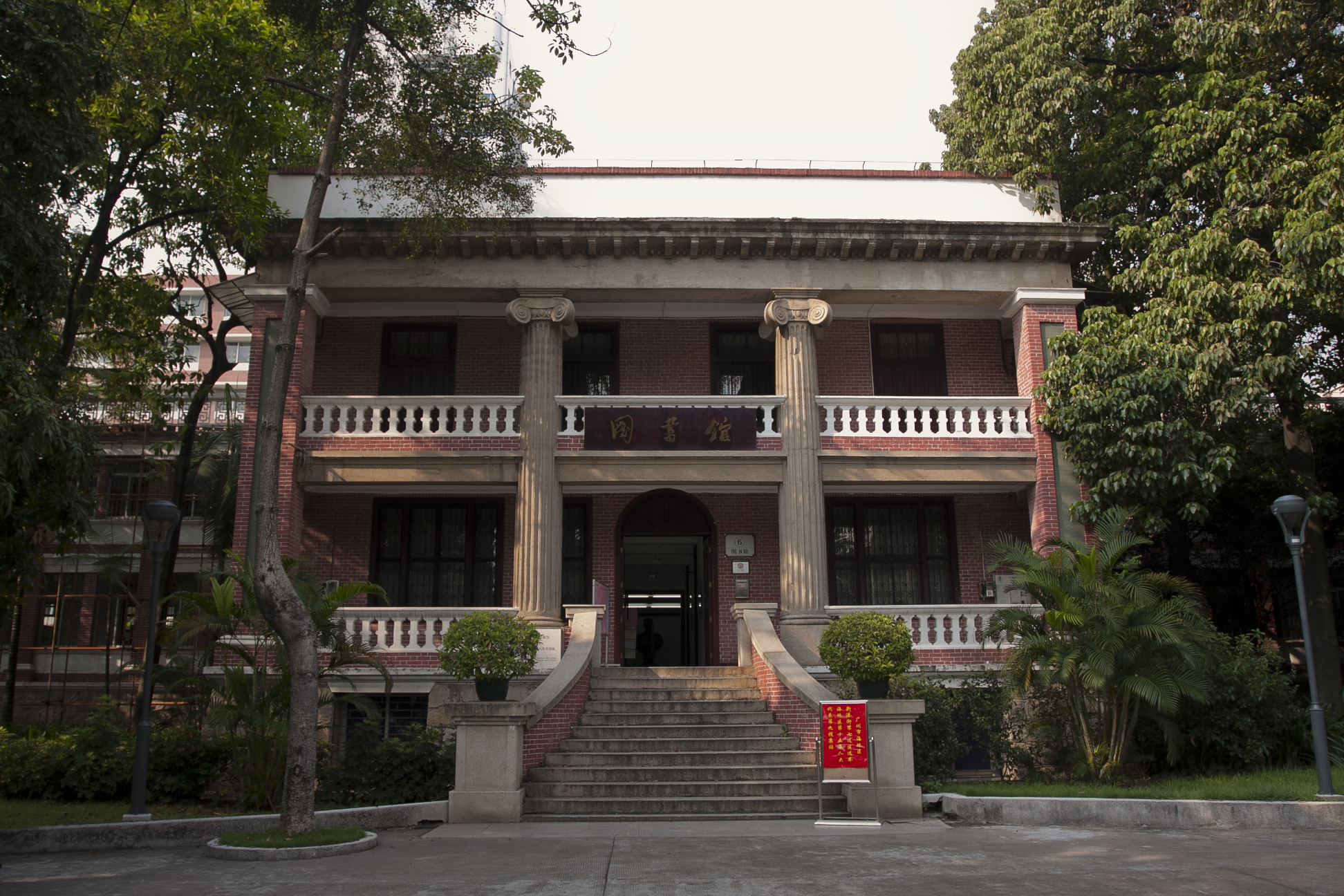
- Guangzhou headquarters
- Active: 1938–1945
- Country: Japan
- Type: Epidemic Prevention and Water Purification Department
- Garrison/HQ: National Sun Yat-sen University, Guangzhou, China
- Engagements: Second Sino-Japanese War

Unit Nami 8604 (Japanese: 波8604部隊), officially the South China Epidemic Prevention and Water Purification Department (Japanese: 南支那防疫給水部, romanized: Nan-shina Bōekikyū Suibu), was a disease research unit under the South China Area Army of the Imperial Japanese Army. This unit extensively and secretly researched biological warfare and other subjects through human experimentation during the Second Sino-Japanese War from 1938 to 1945.

== History ==
Founded in Osaka, Japan in September 1938 as the Epidemic Prevention Department of the Twenty-First Army, this unit landed in Daya Bay with the Twenty-First Army in early October of 1938. It entered Guangzhou in late October and took the campus of the National Sun Yat-sen University School of Medicine as its headquarters. The unit took its names of Unit Nami 8604 and the South China Epidemic Prevention and Water Purification Department in April 1939. The unit was disbanded in August 1945 after the Japanese surrender.

== Organisation ==
The headquarters of Unit 8604 had a General Affairs Division, responsible for logistics, personnel and financial management. The First Section was responsible for bacteriological research and consisted of the General Affairs Section, the Research Section, the Inspection Section, the Media Section, the Sterilisation Section, and the Animal Section, with a total of about 80 men, including 10 general and colonel officers and 7 Chinese labourers. The second class was engaged in research on epidemic prevention and water supply. The third class was responsible for research on the treatment of various infectious diseases. The fourth class was engaged in plague bacteria cultivation and anatomy. The class was located in a basement surrounded by barbed wire, isolated from the outside world, and everything was carried out inside. In the basement of the fourth class's building, many formalin-soaked corpses were stored, and the chief of the section performed autopsies every day. The fifth section was the equipment supply department.

According to the colophon of the unit's name book, in addition to the Guangzhou Headquarters, branches were set up in various parts of Guangdong, as well as in Chuzhou in Anhui Province, Fujian Province, Guangxi Province, and Kowloon in Hong Kong. In 1939, Unit 8604 had six branches, each staffed by 225 men and headed by a medic major. The locations of these branches included Nanning and Qinzhou in Guangxi, as well as three branches in Guangzhou and one in Foshan in Guangdong. In particular, the 12th Field Epidemic Prevention and Water Purification Department was based in Xijiang Village on the northern outskirts of Guangzhou, the original site of the Chinese Fourth Route Army's Field Hospital and Military Medical School.

== Biological warfare ==
The unit engaged in bacteriological research, normally breeding 10,000 rats per month and producing 10 kilograms of plague fleas.

In April 1943, Unit 731 and Unit 8604 had similar production capacities, each capable of producing 10 kilograms of plague-infected flea per month. After that, the Japanese records show that it had a smaller share of bacteria production.

In 1944, production increased to 15 kilograms per month following an order to increase output. According to confessions of a Japanese soldier, the unit had produced deadly bacteria for use against Chinese soldiers and civilians. Local residents had observed Japanese soldiers collecting rats with military vehicles and transporting them in carloads to Unit 8604.

150 kilograms were expected to be produced by Unit 731 of the Kwantung Army, 20 kilograms by Unit 1855 in North China, 30 kilograms by Unit 1644 in Central China, 10 kilograms by Unit 8604 in South China, 60 kilograms by Unit 9420 in Singapore, and 30 kilograms by the Army Medical School in Japan.

On 24 June 1945, the United States bombed and destroyed five rat breeding sheds and plague cultivation facilities of Unit 8604 with 25 to 26 B-29 bombers.

== Nanshitou massacre ==
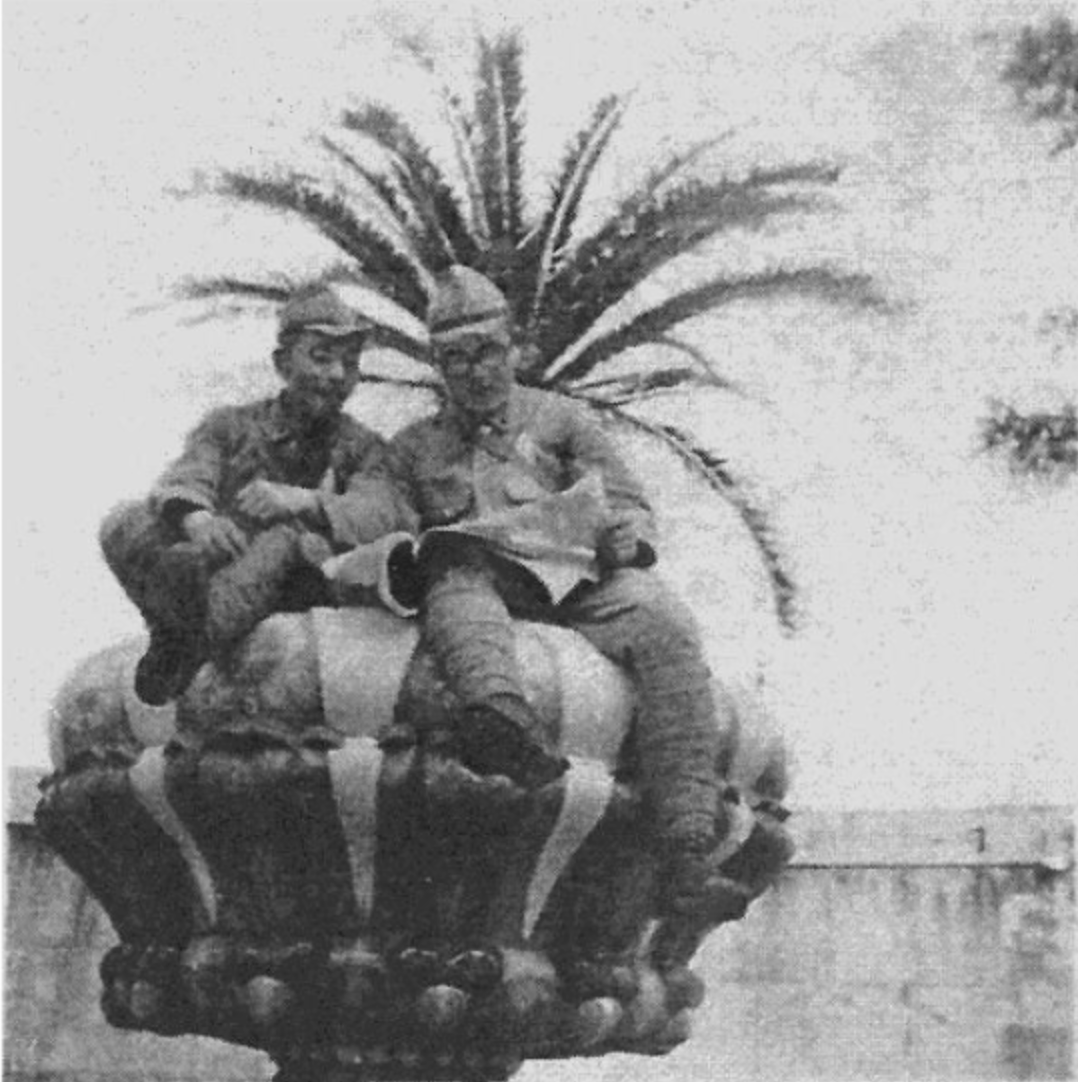
Two soldiers of the unit in Guangzhou

According to a Japanese soldier of the unit, the Japanese invasion of Hong Kong from February to May 1942 resulted in a large number of Hong Kong refugees being forced to leave the city and flood upstream along the Pearl River into Guangzhou. Most of them were detained at the Nanshitou Refugee Camp and subjected to inhumane bacteriological warfare. The Japanese army sent planes to bring in Salmonella enteritidis (paratyphoid bacteria) from the Tokyo-based Army Medical School, and instructed the unit to put it into their food. The refugees unknowingly ingested the bacteria. Salmonella has a high mortality rate, and a succession of deaths ensued.

== See also ==
- Kwantung Army Epidemic Prevention and Water Supply Department Headquarters
