= Ken Yuasa =

Japanese army surgeon

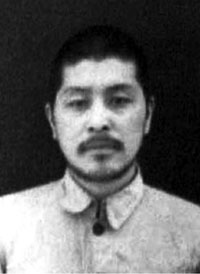
Yuasa as a prisoner of war in China

Ken Yuasa (湯浅 謙; October 23, 1916 – November 2, 2010) was a surgeon for the Japanese army who had been a member of the infamous Unit 731 during the Second Sino-Japanese War. During his service in Japanese-occupied China, he (along with at least 1000 other doctors and nurses) conducted vivisections on Chinese prisoners and civilians, and provided typhoid and dysentery bacilli to the Japanese army for use in biological warfare. Years after the war, he began to realize the extent of the atrocities he and others had committed and began writing, and speaking throughout Japan, about his experiences.

== Early years ==
Yuasa was born in Saitama prefecture and grew up the son of a doctor in Kyōbashi, Tokyo. He decided to follow his father's example and, after graduating from Jikei University's School of Medicine in March 1941, became a doctor. He had originally hoped to become a rural practitioner traveling to remote villages that had no doctor and helping to treat underprivileged patients. However, along with the vast majority of able-bodied young men in Japan, he was soon drafted into the Imperial Army.

== War experiences ==
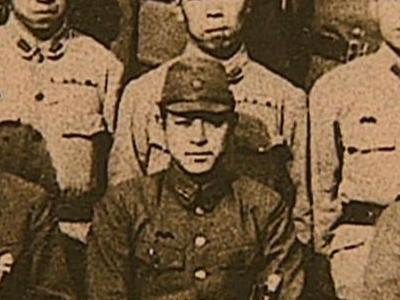
A young Yuasa in the Imperial Japanese Army

Within six weeks of his arrival in China, Yuasa was conducting vivisections of unanaesthetised prisoners. The Japanese army believed in the importance of performing operations on live prisoners as a way of learning how to better care for Japanese field casualties. Yuasa's first vivisection was in March 1942 in the army hospital in Changzhi (formerly Luan) in Shanxi Province. Two Chinese prisoners—a younger man and an older man—were handcuffed to operating tables while 20 other doctors and nurses observed. First, an appendectomy was performed on one of the conscious patients, after which the doctor sutured the wound; then a tracheotomy was demonstrated. Yuasa went on to perform an amputation of the right arm of one of the prisoners. Yuasa admits being afraid during the course of this vivisection, but by his third trial, he admits to being a willing participant. He recalls another operation, in which he operated on a Chinese prisoner, who had been deliberately shot for use as practice for a "real situation". Yuasa was under orders not to use anesthesia.

Yuasa was later put in charge of a clinic where he repeatedly dissected "Communists" delivered to him by the police upon request, all for practice purposes. The "Communists" were Communist sympathizers or ordinary criminals - the majority were Chinese and many were Russian. Yuasa has said that, in all, he participated in six such vivisections. Aside from this practice of vivisection, Yuasa also cultivated typhoid germs and supplied these to Japanese troops; the bacterial culture tubes were used to contaminate wells and ponds of villages in Communist-held territory. Japanese soldiers also became ill; 1,700 died of the diseases.

Recalling his wartime experiences with Chinese prisoners, Yuasa spoke of how he and his colleagues "laughed and joked" during the vivisections, stating further that "we didn't think there was anything strange about it." In a 1997 interview, Yuasa also spoke of his experiences with "comfort stations", stating that the majority of Japanese soldiers felt no hesitation in treating non-Japanese comfort women as sex objects and inflicting violence against them, but that there were rare cases of soldiers developing an intimate relationship with a comfort woman and treating them with less cruelty.

After the war ended, Yuasa became a prisoner of war in Handan, China. He was compelled by his captors to record on paper all of the atrocities he had committed as a doctor in China. It was not until he began to write down in detail his past actions, that he began to realize the magnitude of what he had committed, although he said that he was still in denial about much of his actions at this time. He later transferred to a POW camp in Taiyuan, where he married another POW in 1952. Around this time, Yuasa received a letter from the mother of one of the men he had murdered by vivisection describing the horror she felt when her son was abducted by Japanese military police; this caused Yuasa to weep. Eventually, in 1956, he was released and returned to Japan.

Yuasa was deeply apologetic about what he did.

== Post-war activism ==
Hoping to act as a reminder to Japan that these atrocities must never be repeated, Yuasa was one of a handful of doctors who eventually confessed their crimes to the Japanese public and the world. Subsequent to his return to Japan in the 1950s, he publicly detailed the army's atrocities. He received harassment and even some violent threats from Japanese ultranationalists, and was advised by former colleagues at the Luan army hospital to "go easy" on his revelations. Yuasa also expressed criticism of regulations forcing schools to use the Japanese flag and anthem in schools, which he compared to the uniformity of his own education. Until his death, Yuasa continued touring Japan to tell audiences of his wartime experiences.

== See also ==
- Akira Makino
- Japanese war crimes
- Unit 731

== Sources ==
- Gold, Hal. Unit 731 Testimony, Charles E Tuttle Co., 1996. ISBN 4-900737-39-9.
- Mention of Ken Yuasa's death (in Japanese)
