= Epidemic Prevention and Water Purification Department =

Department of Imperial Japanese Army

- Bōeki Kyūsui-Bu (防疫給水部)
- Active: 1932–1945
- Country: Empire of Japan
- Branch: Imperial Japanese Army
- Type: Biological warfare units
- Weapons: Anthrax, glanders, plague
- Engagements: Second Sino-Japanese War: Battle of Changde; Ningbo plague attack; Nanshitou massacre; Zhejiang-Jiangxi campaign

Commanders
- Notable commanders: Shiro Ishii; Masaji Kitano; Yujiro Wakamatsu

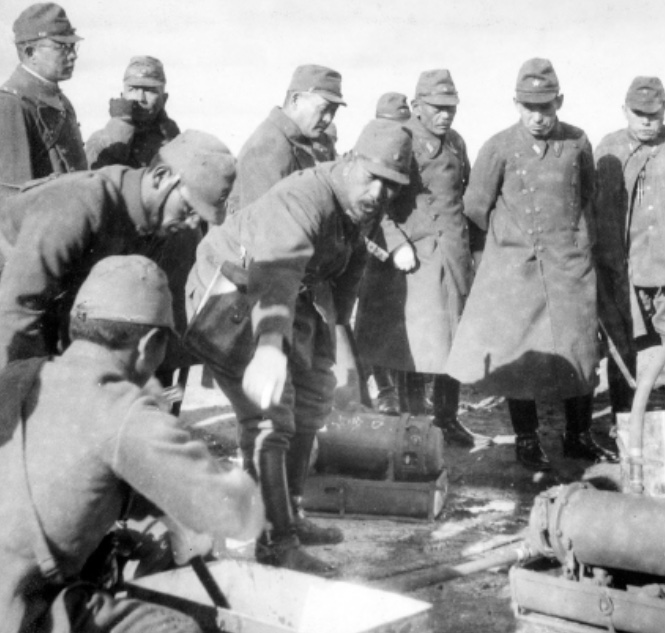
Ishii in 1939 inspecting water filters at the Battle of Khalkhin Gol

The Epidemic Prevention and Water Purification Department was a department of the Imperial Japanese Army from 1936 to the dissolution of the Army in 1945. While its public mission was to prevent the spread of disease and monitor water supply, several field armies also assigned units the mission of manufacturing biological weapons. Many units also performed unethical human experimentation, such as Unit 731, in which tens of thousands of prisoners of war and civilians were tortured to death over the course of years.

== Organization ==
The department was organized under the following system:

- Unit 691 was under control of the Kwantung Army.
  - The central office of Unit 691 was Unit 731, infamous for its secret commitment to chemical and biological weapons and performing human experimentation. It had several branches, all of which were involved with biological warfare research:
    - Unit 162 (Linkou)
    - Unit 643 (Hailin)
    - Unit 673 (Sunwu)
    - Unit 319 was another sub-unit, which apparently were principally devoted to water purification.
- Unit 1855 (Beijing) was under control of the Japanese Northern China Area Army and performed human experimentation.
- Unit Ei 1644 or Tama Unit (Nanjing) was under control of the Japanese Central China Area Army and performed human experimentation.
  - 12 different sub-Units (Unknown names) (Unknown locations)
- Unit 8604 or Nami Unit (Guangzhou) was under control of the Japanese Southern China Area Army and performed human experimentation.
- Unit 9420 or Oka Unit (Singapore), under control of the Southern Expeditionary Army Group and probably performed human experimentation.
  - Unit (Unknown name) (Dairen)
  - Unit 543 (Hailar)
- Unit 516 (Qiqihar)
  - Unit 525
  - Unit 526
- Unit 160, possibly a typo (referring to unit 100).

The 1996 book Germ Warfare Units (細菌戦部隊) contains testimonies that all of these units engaged in biological weapon development.

== Equipment ==
Each office was equipped with water purification facilities and trucks to transport water to where it was needed. The water filtration equipment was designed by Shirō Ishii of Unit 731.
