= Pingfang, Harbin =

Pingfang 平房区
- District
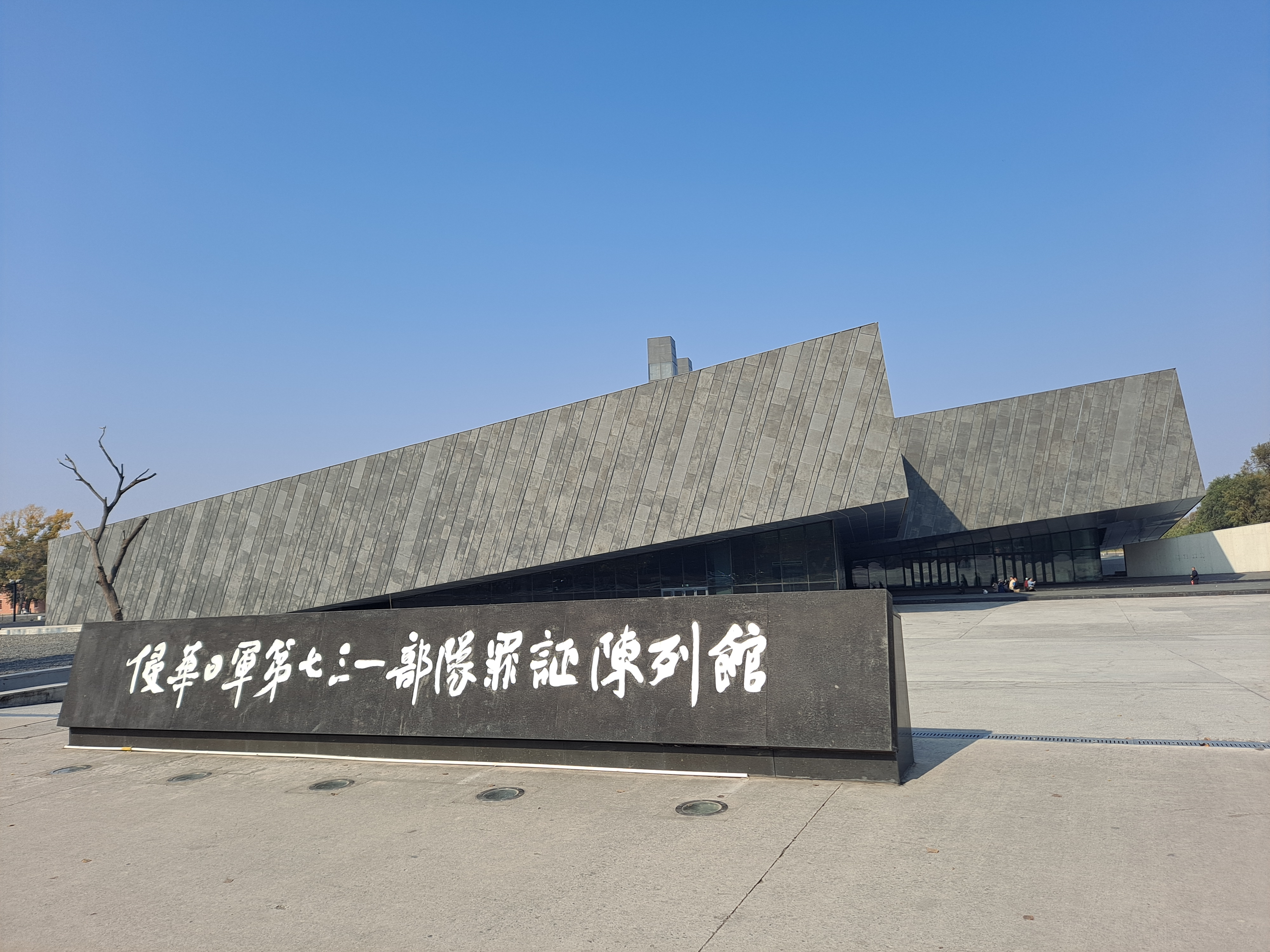
- The Museum of Evidence of War Crimes by Japanese Army Unit 731

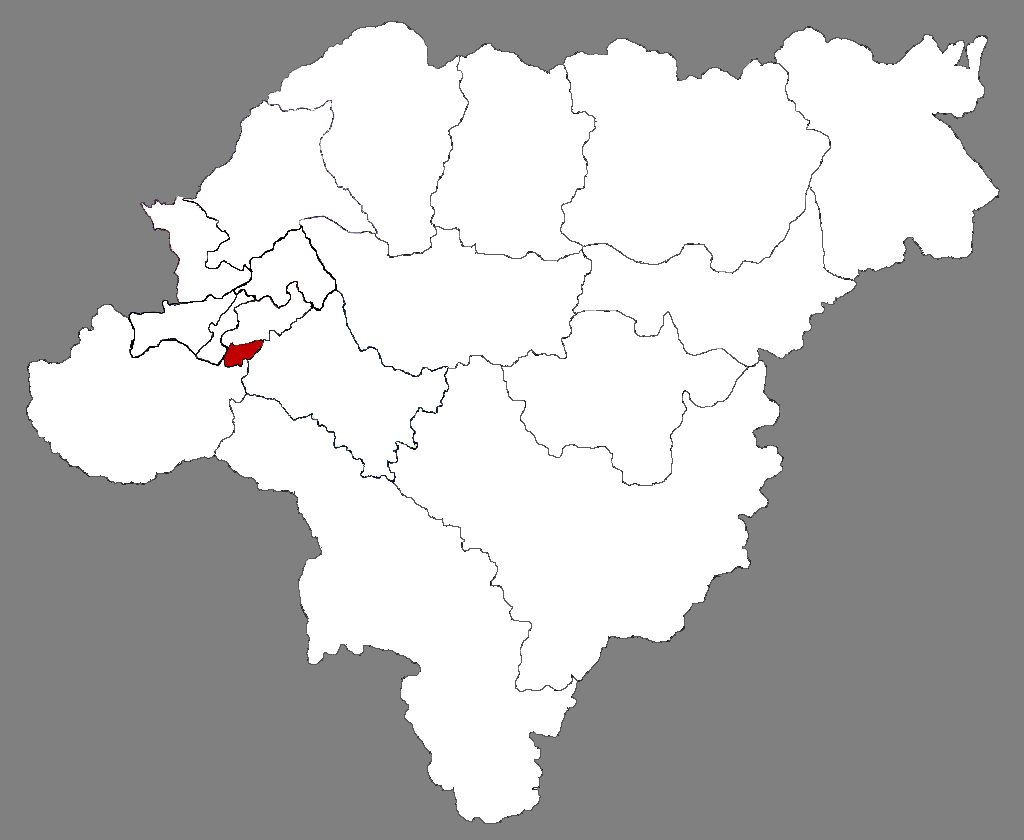
- Location of Pingfang in Harbin

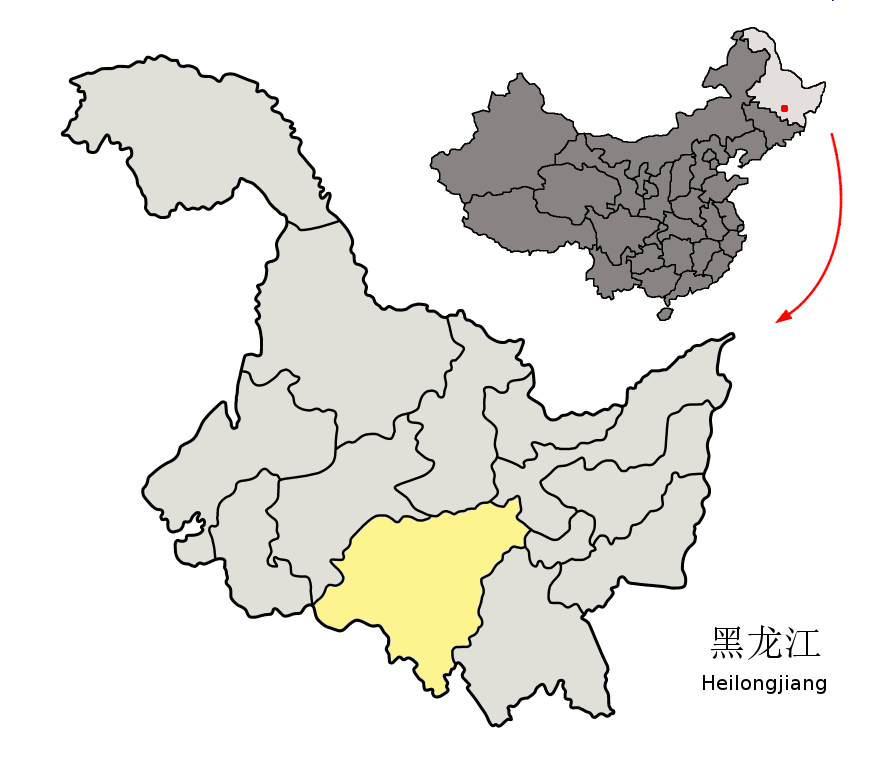
- Harbin in Heilongjiang
- Coordinates: 45°36′12″N 126°37′42″E
- Country: People's Republic of China
- Province: Heilongjiang
- Sub-provincial city: Harbin

Area
  - Total: 98.0 km^{2} (37.8 sq mi)

Population (2010)
  - Total: 190,253
  - Density: 1,940/km^{2} (5,030/sq mi)
- Time zone: UTC+8 (China Standard)

Pingfang District (simplified Chinese: 平房区; traditional Chinese: 平房區; pinyin: Píngfáng Qū) is one of nine districts of the prefecture-level city of Harbin, the capital of Heilongjiang Province, Northeast China, forming part of the city's urban core. The least spacious of Harbin's county-level divisions, it borders the districts of Xiangfang to the north, Acheng to the east, Shuangcheng to the southwest, and Nangang to the west.

== History ==
Pingfang was the headquarters of the Japanese biological warfare research facility Unit 731 during the Japanese invasion of China and World War II. It had an airport, railway and dungeons. Most of Pingfang was burnt by Japanese officials to destroy evidence but the incinerator where the remains of victims were burnt remains and is still in use as part of a factory.

== Administrative divisions ==
Pingfang District is divided into 9 subdistricts and 1 town.

9 subdistricts

- Xingjian (兴建街道), Baoguo (保国街道), Lianmeng (联盟街道), Youxie (友协街道), Xinjiang (新疆街道), Xinwei (新伟街道), Pingxin (平新街道), Jian'an (建安街道), Pingsheng (平盛街道)

1 town

- Pingfang (平房镇)

== Economy ==
Pingfang is an industrial center of Harbin nowadays. Hafei (a factory producing helicopters, light aircraft, minivans, and cars), Dongan (a factory producing aircraft and automobile engines), and Northeast Light Alloy Processing Plant are the three major manufacturers there.

Harbin Aircraft Industry Group (Hafei) has its headquarters in the district.
