= Unit 543 =

Secret facility of Imperial Japanese army

Unit 543 was a secret Imperial Japanese Army facility at Hailar that focused on the development of biological weapons during World War II. It was operated by the Kempeitai, the Japanese military police.

== See also ==
- Japanese war crimes
- List of Japanese War Atrocities
- Kantogun
- Second Sino-Japanese War
