= Allegations of biological warfare in the Korean War =

Allegations of US biological warfare

Chinese propaganda poster from the Korean War era: "Vaccinate everyone, to crush the germ warfare of US imperialism!"

Allegations that the United States military used biological weapons in the Korean War (June 1950 – July 1953) were raised by the governments of the People's Republic of China, the Soviet Union, and North Korea. China and North Korea also made allegations that US forces used chemical weapons. No other countries, nor any body not affiliated or allied with the Soviet Union, have confirmed or raised those concerns. The primary evidence for the claims were obtained via torture on two US pilots, who recanted the claims after release. The International Red Cross and World Health Organization ruled out biological warfare being deployed in the Korean war.

The claims were first raised in 1951, and made broad claims of use of anti-personnel, anti-crop, and anti-animal pathogens, including the causative agents of anthrax, plague, smallpox, and typhoid fever. The story was covered by the worldwide press and led to a highly publicized, Soviet backed international investigation in 1952. Secretary of State Dean Acheson and other American and allied government officials denounced the allegations as a hoax.

== Background ==
Until the end of World War II, Japan operated a covert biological and chemical warfare research and development unit called Unit 731 in Harbin (now China). The unit's activities, including human experimentation, were documented by the Khabarovsk War Crime Trials conducted by the Soviet Union in December 1949. Although the US government at the time described the Khabarovsk trials as "vicious and unfounded propaganda", it was later revealed that the accusations made against the Japanese military were correct. The US government had taken over the research at the end of the war and had then covered up the program. Leaders of Unit 731 were exempted from war crimes prosecution by the United States and then placed on the payroll of the US.

On 30 June 1950, soon after the outbreak of the Korean War, the US Defense Secretary George Marshall received the Report of the Committee on Chemical, Biological and Radiological Warfare and Recommendations, which advocated urgent development of a biological weapons program. The biological weapons research facility at Fort Detrick, Maryland was expanded, and a new one in Pine Bluff, Arkansas, was developed. In December 1951, as the war turned against the United States, the Defense Secretary ordered early readiness for using biological weapons offensively.

== Allegations ==
The Chinese and North Koreans made allegations, both publicly and at the United Nations, of U.S. use of biological warfare. In a May 8, 1951 cablegram from the Foreign Minister of the Democratic People's Republic of Korea, Pak Hon-yong, to the President of the UN Security Council. Pak cited documents captured from South Korean forces that described plans "for the use of bacteria in diversionary work on the territory of North Korea." One plan, allegedly drawn up by "Section 3 of the Intelligence Bureau of the Staff of the South Korean Army," described spreading infectious material in "Army kitchens," "police mess-rooms," "city reservoirs," and "houses of army, government and party leaders," and other areas. These plans also called for spreading bacteria in eleven different towns, as well as against "units of the People's Army." In addition, Pak charged that "several areas" had been "infected with small-pox sickness 7 to 8 days after their liberation from American occupation." Pak said there were smallpox cases in Pyongyang and five outlying DPRK provinces, amounting to at least 3,500 smallpox cases, allegedly due to deliberate spread of variola virus. Ultimately, these charges were not pursued, but when in 1952 the Communists took up the germ war charges again, they did refer back to the 1951 smallpox cases. General Matthew Ridgway, United Nations Commander in Korea, denounced the initial charges as early as May 1951. He accused the communists of spreading "deliberate lies". A few days later, Vice Admiral Charles Turner Joy repeated the denials. French journalist André Stil, who was a member of the French Communist Party and editor of the socialist newspaper L'Humanité, was arrested for publishing and repeating these allegations.

On 28 January 1952, the Chinese People's Volunteer Army headquarters received a report of a smallpox outbreak southeast of Incheon. From February to March 1952, more bulletins reported disease outbreaks in the area of Chorwon, Pyongyang, Kimhwa and even Manchuria. The Chinese soon became concerned when 13 Korean and 16 Chinese soldiers contracted cholera and the plague, while another 44 recently deceased were tested positive for meningitis. Although the Chinese and the North Koreans did not know exactly how the soldiers contracted the diseases, the suspicions soon fell on the Americans.

On 22 February 1952, Pak Hon-yong made a formal allegation that American planes had been dropping infected insects onto North Korea. He added that the Americans were "openly collaborating with the Japanese bacteriological war criminals, the former jackals of the Japanese militarists whose crimes are attested to by irrefutable evidence. Among the Japanese war criminals sent to Korea were Shirō Ishii, Masaji Kitano, and Jirō Wakamatsu." Pak's accusations were immediately denied by the US government. The accusation was supported by eye-witness accounts by Australian reporter Wilfred Burchett and others.

In June 1952, the United States proposed to the United Nations Security Council that the Council request the International Red Cross investigate the allegations. The Soviet Union vetoed the American resolution due to extensive US influence inside the Red Cross, and, along with its allies, continued to insist on the veracity of the biological warfare accusations.

In February 1953, China and North Korea produced two captured U.S. Marine Corps pilots to support the allegations. Colonel Frank Schwable was reported to have stated that: "The basic objective was at that time to get under field conditions various elements of bacteriological warfare and possibly expand field tests at a later date into an element of regular combat operations." Schwable's statement said that B-29s flew biological warfare missions to Korea from airfields in American-occupied Okinawa starting in November 1951. Schwable's statement was obtained following months of torture and abuse at the hands of his captors, according to the US military. Other captured Americans such as Colonel Walker "Bud" Mahurin made similar statements.

Despite the allegations of torture, a United Press report in February 1954 described how U.S. flyers had been instructed by their superior officers that if they were captured on missions they could, according to Marine Major Walter R. Harris, "tell anything you want to." Similarly, Marine Colonel—and Medal of Honor recipient—R. E. Galer, who, like Schwable, had been shot down over Korea, said, according to an Associated Press report, that "the Strategic Air Command and other Air Force units briefed their men to tell more than their names, rank and serial numbers.”

At the Winter 1954 Marine Corps Board of Inquiry hearing on Colonel Frank Schwable's alleged collaboration with his Chinese captors, the Commandant of the Marine Corps admitted "the conflicting nature of existing instructions relative to the conduct of members of the armed forces while held as prisoners of war." Meanwhile, several paragraphs on what exact instructions had been given to the flyers were redacted in the publication of the Inquiry's findings as published in The New York Times.

Upon release the prisoners of war repudiated their confessions, which they said had been extracted by torture. However, the retractions happened in front of military cameras after the United States government threatened to charge the POWs with treason for cooperating with their captors. Kenneth Enoch, one of the former POWs who retracted his confession, was tracked down in 2010 by Al Jazeera reporters. He denied being ill-treated or indoctrinated by the North Korean or Chinese guards or playing any personal role in biological weapons attacks, but said "they send it with you."

=== International Scientific Commission ===
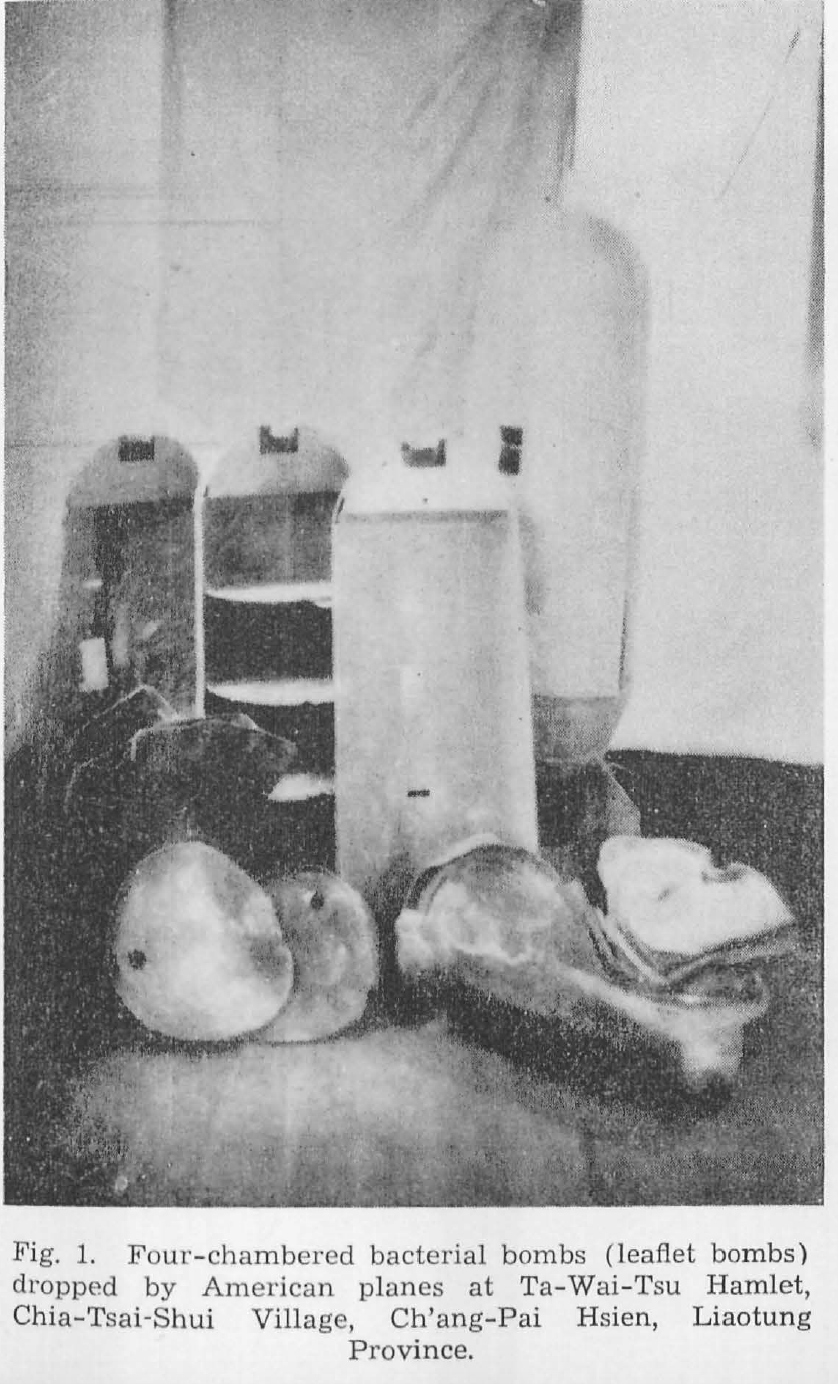
Picture of alleged American bacterial bombs from the 1952 ISC report. The bomb casing in question is a M105 leaflet bomb, developed for dispersing propaganda leaflets. Chinese forces alleged that such weapons were appropriated for use in dispersing biological agents.

When the International Red Cross and the World Health Organization ruled out biological warfare, the Chinese government denounced them as being biased by the influence of the US, and arranged an investigation by the Soviet-affiliated World Peace Council. The World Peace Council set up the "International Scientific Commission for the Facts Concerning Bacterial Warfare in China and Korea" (ISC). This commission had several distinguished scientists and doctors from France, Italy, Sweden, Brazil and Soviet Union, including renowned British biochemist and sinologist Joseph Needham. The commission's findings included dozens of eyewitnesses, testimonies from doctors, medical samples from the deceased, bomb casings as well as four American Korean War prisoners who confirmed the US use of biological warfare. On 15 September 1952, the final report was signed, stating that the US was experimenting with biological weapons in Korea.

The report suggested a link to the World War II Japanese germ warfare Unit 731. Former Unit 731 members Shirō Ishii, Masaji Kitano, and Ryōichi Naitō, as well as other Japanese biological warfare experts, were often named in the allegations. Former members of Unit 731 were linked initially, by a Communist news agency, to a freighter that allegedly carried them and all equipment necessary to mount a biological warfare campaign to Korea in 1951. The commission placed credence on allegations that Ishii made two visits to South Korea in early 1952, and another one in March 1953. The official consensus in China was that biological weapons created from an American-Japanese collaboration were used in the Korean episode. Citing the claims Ishii had visited South Korea, the report stated: "Whether occupation authorities in Japan had fostered his activities, and whether the American Far Eastern Command was engaged in making use of methods essentially Japanese, were questions which could hardly have been absent from the minds of members of the Commission."

The International Association of Democratic Lawyers (IADL) publicized these claims in its 1952 "Report on U.S. Crimes in Korea", as did US journalist John W. Powell.

=== The Sams mission ===
The Communists also alleged that US Brigadier General Crawford Sams had carried out a secret mission behind their lines at Wonsan in March 1951, testing biological weapons. The US government said that he had actually been investigating a reported outbreak of bubonic plague in North Korea, but had determined it was hemorrhagic smallpox. Sams' mission had been launched from the US Navy's LCI(L)-1091, which had been converted to a laboratory ship in 1951. During its time in Korea, the ship was assigned as an epidemiological control ship for Fleet Epidemic Disease Control Unit No. 1, a part of the US effort to combat malaria in Korea. After covert missions in North Korea, from October to September 1951, LSIL-1091 was at Koje-do testing residents and refugees for malaria.

Some authors have emphasized Sams' relationship with biological warfare actors, which both China and North Korea found suspicious. According to Japanese historian, Takemae Eiji, Sams had a relationship with the former members of Imperial Japan's biological warfare department, Unit 731. Appointed by General MacArthur as the head of the post-war Occupation government's Public Health & Welfare Section, Sams was instrumental in founding Japan's National Institute of Health, whose first deputy director, Kojima Saburō, was an Ishii associate. Saburō then recruited other former Unit 731 personnel for the new Institute. According to Eiji, "Sams and others in PH&W not only knew of these men's sordid pasts but actively solicited their cooperation to further PH&W goals. ... Sams and his staff became, in effect, co-conspirators after the fact in those wartime crimes".

== Counterclaims ==
The US and its allies responded by describing the allegations as a hoax. The US government declared the IADL to be a Communist front organization since 1950, and charged Powell with sedition. In a highly publicized 1959 trial, Powell was indicted on 13 counts of sedition for reporting on the allegations, while two of his editors were indicted on one count of sedition each. All charges were dropped after the trial ended in mistrial after five years. However, Powell was then blacklisted and thereafter unable to secure work as a journalist for the rest of his life.

According to news reports during the trial, the U.S. Attorney in the case, James B. Schnake, submitted an affidavit in which he stated the U.S. government was prepared to stipulate "that during the period Jan. 1, 1949, through July 27, 1953, the United States Army had a capability to wage both chemical and biological warfare offensively and defensively. ... Responsible officials in the Department of Defense have determined the revelations of detailed records on this subject would be highly detrimental to the national security."

American authorities long denied the charges of postwar Japanese-United States cooperation in biological warfare developments, despite later incontrovertible proof that the US pardoned Unit 731 in exchange for their research, according to Sheldon H. Harris. But in December 1998, in a letter from Department of Justice official Eli Rosenbaum to Rabbi Abraham Cooper of the Simon Wiesenthal Center, a U.S. government official admitted that the U.S. had made an amnesty agreement with Shiro Ishii and personnel from Unit 731, despite known crimes committed by Ishii and associates concerning illegal human experimentation. The letter wasn't made public until published by Jeffrey Kaye in May 2017.

Australian journalist, Denis Warner, suggested that the story was concocted by Wilfred Burchett as part of his alleged role as a KGB agent of influence. Warner pointed out the similarity of the allegations to a science fiction story by Jack London, a favorite author of Burchett's. However, the notion that Burchett originated the "hoax" has been decisively refuted by one of his most trenchant critics, Tibor Méray. Méray worked as a correspondent for the Hungarian People's Republic during the war but fled the country after the abortive Hungarian Revolution of 1956. Now a staunch anti-Communist, he has confirmed that he saw clusters of flies crawling on ice. Méray has argued the evidence was the result of an elaborate conspiracy: "Now somehow or other these flies must have been brought there ... the work must have been carried out by a large network covering the whole of North Korea."

== Disease prevention measures ==
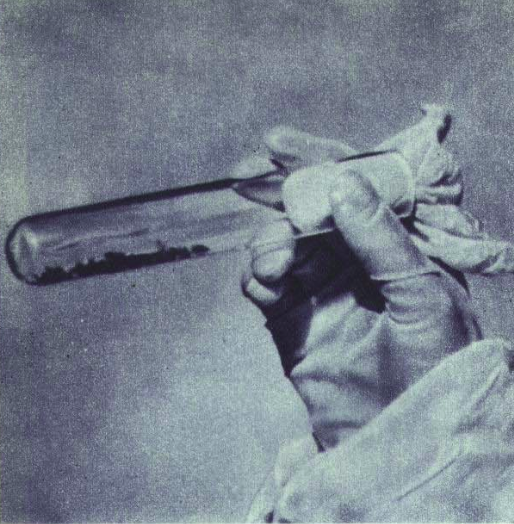
Chinese photograph of infected fleas allegedly spread by the United States

Recent research has indicated that, regardless of the accuracy of the allegations, the Chinese acted as if they were true. After learning of the outbreaks, Mao Zedong immediately requested Soviet assistance on disease preventions, while the Chinese People's Liberation Army General Logistics Department was mobilized for anti-bacteriological warfare. On the Korean battlefield, four anti-bacteriological warfare research centers were soon set up, while about 5.8 million doses of vaccine and 200,000 gas masks were delivered to the front. Within China, 66 quarantine stations were also set up along the Chinese borders, while about 5 million Chinese in Manchuria were inoculated. The Chinese government also initiated the "Patriotic Health and Epidemic Prevention Campaign" and directed every citizen to kill flies, mosquitoes and fleas. These disease prevention measures soon resulted in an improvement of health for Communist soldiers on the Korean battlefield. Tibor Méray provided eyewitness account of North Korea conducting an "unprecedented campaign of public health" during the allegation.

== Subsequent evaluation ==
Some historians have offered other explanations to the disease outbreaks during the spring of 1952. For example, it has been noted that spring time is usually a period of epidemics within China and North Korea, and years of warfare had also caused a breakdown in the Korean health care system. US military historians have argued that under these circumstances, diseases could easily spread throughout the entire military and civilian populations within Korea.

In 1986, Australian historian Gavan McCormack argued that the claim of US biological warfare use was "far from inherently implausible", pointing out that one of the POWs who confessed, Walker Mahurin, was in fact associated with Fort Detrick. He also pointed out that, as the deployment of nuclear and chemical weapons was considered, there is no reason to believe that ethical principles would have overruled the resort to biological warfare. He also suggested that the outbreak in 1951 of viral haemorrhagic fever, which had previously been unknown in Korea, was linked to biological warfare. However, by 2004, McCormack had changed his mind. In a book about North Korea, he wrote that the alleged Soviet archival documents published by Kathryn Weathersby and Milton Leitenberg in 1998 (see discussion in section on "Endicott and Hagerman" below) had “provided a fragmentary, but persuasive, explanation of what had actually happened” in relation to the germ warfare charges. According to McCormack, “Analysis of these documents makes it seem almost certain that there was a vigorous, complex, contrived, and fraudulent international campaign on the part of the North Koreans, the Chinese, and the Russians — a gigantic fraud….”

In their 1988 book Korea: The Unknown War, historians Jon Halliday and Bruce Cumings questioned whether North Korea and China could have “mounted a spectacular piece of fraudulent theater, involving the mobilization of thousands,” including scores of Chinese doctors, scientists, and senior officials, to "fake evidence, lie, and invent medical fraud" as part of a propaganda campaign against the United States. However, the U.S. News & World Report on November 16, 1998, asserted that this was indeed the case. According to declassified documents from the Russia's Presidential Archive, in 1952, North Korea's health minister secretly traveled to Beijing and Shenyang to obtain a sample of plague bacilli, which was then used to infect two death row prisoners, creating "evidence" that the United States had engaged in germ warfare. These tissue samples were later used to deceive international investigators. The documents further reveal that the Soviet and Chinese leadership, including Mao Zedong, were involved in this propaganda effort. A report to Soviet intelligence chief Lavrenti Beria acknowledged that the alleged plague outbreaks were deliberately fabricated, including fake burials and fictitious cases of plague and cholera. It was not until after Joseph Stalin's death in 1953 that the Soviet Union decided to end the deception campaign.

In 1994, historian Sheldon Harris published Factories of Death: Japanese Biological Warfare, 1932–45, and the American Cover-up, exposing the deal between Unit 731 and the U.S. military. However, the book does not explicitly support the claim that the U.S. military used biological weapons during the Korean War.

In 1995, using available Chinese documents, historian Shu Guang Zhang of the University of Maryland stated that there is little, if any information that currently exists on the Chinese side which explains how the Chinese scientists came up with the conclusion of US biological warfare during the disease outbreak in the spring of 1952. Zhang further theorized that the allegation was caused by unfounded rumors and scientific investigations on the allegation was purposely ignored on the Chinese side for the sake of domestic and international propaganda.

Published in Japan in 2001, the book Rikugun Noborito Kenkyujo no shinjitsu or The Truth About the Army Noborito Institute stated that members of Japan's Unit 731 also worked for the "chemical section" of a US clandestine unit hidden within Yokosuka Naval Base during the Korean War as well as on projects inside the United States from 1955 to 1959.

According to Jeffrey Kaye's interpretation of a "Memorandum of Conversation" from the Psychological Strategy Board (PSB) dated 6 July 1953 (and declassified and released by the CIA in 2006), the US protestations at the United Nations did not mean the US was serious about conducting any investigation into biological warfare charges, despite what the government said publicly. The reason the US didn't want any investigation was because an "actual investigation" would reveal military operations, "which, if revealed, could do us psychological as well as military damage". The memorandum, which had been sent to CIA director Allen Dulles, specifically stated as an example of what could be revealed "Eighth Army preparations or operations (e.g. chemical warfare)."

Investigative journalist Simon Winchester concluded in 2008 that Soviet intelligence was sceptical of the allegation, but that North Korean leader Kim Il Sung believed it. Winchester said the question "has still not been satisfactorily answered".

Entomologist Jeffrey A. Lockwood wrote in 2009 that the biological warfare program at Ft. Detrick began to research the use of insects as disease vectors going back to World War II and also employed German and Japanese scientists after the war who had experimented on human subjects among POWs and concentration camp inmates. Scientists used or attempted to use a wide variety of insects in their biowar plans, including fleas, ticks, ants, lice and mosquitoes – especially mosquitoes that carried the yellow fever virus. They also tested these in the United States. Lockwood thinks that it is very likely that the US did use insects dropped from aircraft during the Korean War to spread diseases, and that the Chinese and North Koreans were not simply engaged in a propaganda campaign when they made these allegations, since the Joint Chiefs of Staff and Secretary of Defense had approved their use in the fall of 1950 at the "earliest practicable time". At that time, it had five biowarfare agents ready for use, three of which were spread by insect vectors.

In March 2010, the allegations were investigated by the Al Jazeera English news program People & Power. In this program, Professor Mori Masataka investigated historical artifacts in the form of bomb casings from US biological weapons, contemporary documentary evidence and eyewitness testimonies. The program also uncovered a crucial document in the US National Archives which showed that in September 1951, the US Joint Chiefs of Staff issued orders to start "large scale field tests ... to determine the effectiveness of specific BW [bacteriological warfare] agents under operational conditions". Masataka concluded that: "Use of germ weapons in war is in breach of the Geneva Convention. I think that's why the Americans are refusing to admit the allegations. But I have no doubt. I'm absolutely sure that this happened.” The program concluded by noting that no conclusive evidence of the US's innocence or culpability has ever been presented.

Yanhuang Chunqiu, a liberal monthly journal in China, published an account in 2013 allegedly from Wu Zhili, the former surgeon general of Chinese People's Voluntary Army Logistic Department, which said that the bio warfare allegation was a false alarm, and that he had been forced to fabricate evidence. This account was published after the author's death in 2008. Its authenticity subsequently has been called into question by the Chinese Memorial of the War to Resist US Aggression and Aid Korea as unverifiable, because every single figure involved in the alleged private conversations and insider events from the account who could testify otherwise, had died before the date of publication. The museum also refuted the account's claim that "not one casualty resulted from events associated with biological warfare" as there are many clear records of such casualties, and claimed that it's implausible for a meager medical officer back then to have the technical knowledge to fool dozens of international medical experts signing the ISC report.

In 2019, the Pyongyang Times repeated the allegation, and said that the US government was continuing to develop biological warfare capabilities to use against North Korea.

=== Endicott and Hagerman ===
In 1998, Canadian researchers and historians Stephen L. Endicott and Edward Hagerman of York University made the case that the accusations were true in their book, The United States and Biological Warfare: Secrets from the Early Cold War and Korea. Shanghai-born Endicott, a Communist sympathizer, was the son of clergyman James Gareth Endicott, a prominent member of the Soviet-affiliated World Peace Council.

A US Military Academy professor called the book an example of "bad history" and with another review in The New York Times calling the book's lack of direct evidence "appalling". Other reviews praised the book, with the director of East Asian studies at University of Pennsylvania saying "Endicott and Hagerman is far and away the most authoritative work on the subject", a review in Korean Quarterly calling it "a fascinating work of serious scholarship ... presenting a compelling argument that the United States did, in fact, secretly experiment with biological weapons during the Korean War", and a review in The Nation calling it "the most impressive, expertly researched and, as far as the official files allow, the best-documented case for the prosecution yet made". A staff writer at state-owned China Daily noted that their book was the only one to have combined research across United States, Japan, Canada, Europe and China, as they were "the first foreigners to be given access to classified documents in the Chinese Central Archives".

In response, Kathryn Weathersby and Milton Leitenberg of the Cold War International History Project at the Woodrow Wilson Center released a cache of Soviet and Chinese documents in 1998 that they said revealed the allegations to have been an elaborate disinformation campaign. The handcopied documents are from Russian Presidential Archive, provided to Japanese reporter Yasuo Naito by a Russian researcher, and were published in Japanese in the Sankei Shimbun. Weathersby admitted that due to the way the documents are collected, there is no way to confirm their authenticity as seals, stamps or signature are missing, but due to their complexity and interwoven content, they are "extremely difficult to forge" and thus credible sources. They said that North Korea's health minister traveled in 1952 to the remote Manchurian city of Mukden where he procured a culture of plague bacilli which was used to infect condemned criminals as part of an elaborate disinformation scheme. Tissue samples were then used to fool the international investigators. The papers included telegrams and reports of meetings among Soviet and Chinese leaders, including Mao Zedong. A report to Lavrenti Beria, head of Soviet intelligence, for example, stated: "False plague regions were created, burials ... were organized, measures were taken to receive the plague and cholera bacillus. The advisor of the MVD [Ministry of Internal Affairs] DPRK proposed to infect with the cholera and plague bacilli persons sentenced to execution". These documents revealed that only after Stalin's death the following year did the Soviet Union halt the disinformation campaign. Weathersby and Leitenberg consider their evidence to be conclusive—that the allegations were disinformation and no biological warfare use occurred. In 2001, writer Herbert Romerstein supported Weathersby and Leitenberg's position while criticizing Endicott's research on the basis that it is based on accounts provided by the Chinese government.

Endicott and Hagerman responded to Weathersby and Leitenberg, noting that the documents are in fact handwritten copies and "the original source is not disclosed, the name of the collection is not identified, nor is there a volume number which would allow other scholars to locate and check the documents". They claimed that even if genuine the documents do not prove the United States did not use biological weapons, and they pointed out what they asserted to be various errors and inconsistencies in Weathersby and Leitenberg's analysis. According to Australian author and judge, Michael Pembroke, the documents associated with Beria (published by Weathersby and Leitenberg) were mostly created during the time of the power struggle after Stalin's death and are therefore questionable. In 2018, he concluded that: "It seems likely that the full story of the United States' involvement in biological warfare in Korea has not yet been told."

== See also ==
- 2001 anthrax attacks - a rogue agent at Fort Detrick was the suspected perpetuator, according to FBI investigations
- Ningbo plague attack
- Khabarovsk war crimes trials
- Misinformation related to the COVID-19 pandemic
- Operation Big Buzz
- Operation Big Itch
- Operation Drop Kick
- Operation Sea-Spray - declassified US navy secret experiment in 1950 where supposedly harmless pathogens were sprayed over San Francisco in open-air tests of germ warfare.
- Project 112
- SARS conspiracy theory
- Unethical human experimentation in the United States
- United States biological weapons program
- Yellow rain
