= Murray Sanders =

American physician and military officer (1910–1987)

- Sanders in the U.S. Army, 1945
- Born: Murray Jonathan Sanders; April 11, 1910; Chelsea, Massachusetts, US
- Died: June 29, 1987 (aged 77); Delray Beach, Florida, US
- Education: Tufts University (B.S.); Rush Medical College (M.D.)
- Spouse: Margaret Weatherly
- Children: 3
- Awards: Legion of Merit; Nobel Prize in Medicine (nominated)
- Scientific career
- Fields: Microbiology; bacteriology; neurology
- Workplaces: Columbia University; University of Miami; Florida Atlantic University

Murray Jonathan Sanders (April 11, 1910 – June 29, 1987) was an American physician and military officer who was involved with the U.S. Army's biological warfare program during World War II. He was a leading figure in the American cover-up of Japanese war crimes, having been the U.S. officer who convinced General Douglas MacArthur to grant legal immunity to members of the infamous Japanese Unit 731 chemical warfare research unit, despite the unit's practice of unethical human experimentation.

Sanders was nominated for a Nobel Prize in Medicine in 1966 for his efforts in devising a potential treatment for amyotrophic lateral sclerosis. He was also the first to identify adenoviral keratoconjunctivitis, a viral infection of the eye.

== Early life and education ==
Murray Sanders was born in Chelsea, Massachusetts on April 11, 1910 to parents Louis and Rose (Gould) Sanders. He studied microbiology at Tufts University, Heidelberg University and Rush Medical College, graduating from the latter in 1931 with an MD in the field. Sanders also received further training at Columbia University, eventually becoming a professor in bacteriology at its College of Physicians and Surgeons, where he engaged in polio research.

== Military service ==
Sanders was drafted into the United States Army in 1943 and was stationed at Fort Detrick, where he became involved with the army's research and development of biological weapons. Sanders performed a number of classified experiments and investigations at Detrick, including some with disastrous results; during experiments involving brucellosis and tularemia, many scientists on Sanders' team ended up falling ill with the virus. According to Sanders, there were "casualties in the workplace", and an experiment by his team nearly resulted in the death of the infant Gifford Pinchot III, grandson of Pennsylvania governor Gifford Pinchot. After Sanders informed the elder Pinchot of his grandson's condition, in a meeting where Supreme Court justice Hugo Black was also present, Sanders was placed under house arrest for 48 hours.

In addition to his experiments at Detrick, Sanders was responsible for the poisoning of a German agent with staphylococcus, and proposed the use of biological weapons infused with botulism. In 1945, following the discovery of a Japanese balloon near Butte, Montana, Sanders led an investigation that concluded that the Japanese Empire was planning to wage biological warfare on the United States through the dropping of anthrax-infused bombs on targets along the Pacific Coast. He was awarded the Legion of Merit for his efforts in "the development, perfection and standardization of laboratory methods for detection and evaluation of actual potential biological warfare agents".

=== Unit 731 cover-up ===
Sanders had been aware of Japan's biological warfare program since 1944, when he was informed of the poisoning of wells by Japanese troops in Manchuria. In September 1945, Sanders traveled aboard the steamship Sturgess for Yokohama, where General Douglas MacArthur had summoned him to investigate Japan's biological warfare program. Among the first Japanese scientists Sanders interviewed upon his arrival in Japan was Ryōichi Naitō, who initially denied any accusations of having conducted unethical human experimentation, stating that the Japanese military had engaged solely in defensive research, and that experimenting on humans was "clearly against humanity". While unknown to Sanders at the time, Naito secretly conferred with Japanese officials regarding the progress of his discussions with the Americans. After Sanders threatened to hand Naito and other scientists over to the Soviet Union, however, head scientist Shirō Ishii agreed to send Sanders a manuscript which detailed their activities whilst headquartered at Harbin. According to Sanders, the manuscripts contained clear proof of human experimentation, though this evidence was omitted from his final reports to MacArthur.

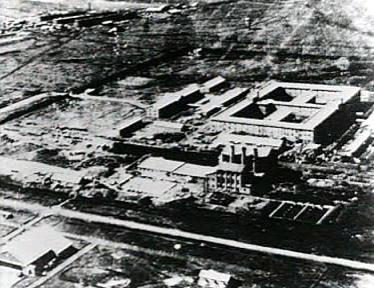
The headquarters of Unit 731.

After reviewing the data provided by those involved in Unit 731, Sanders presented the findings to MacArthur, stating that he believed the data to contain valuable information that must not end up in British, French, or Soviet hands. Knowing that the physicians had fled their headquarters in order to avoid prosecution by the Soviets for war crimes, Sanders suggested that MacArthur grant the physicians involved legal immunity against any war crimes charges in exchange for their data, stating, "My recommendation is that we promise Naito that no one involved in [bioweapons] will be prosecuted as war criminals". MacArthur agreed with Sanders' proposal, believing the data “almost incalculable and incredibly valuable to the United States”, and agreed to grant the unit's physicians immunity from prosecution as long as they exchanged their data with only the Americans. Furthermore, Sanders was urged by MacArthur to "keep quiet" about any human experiments. Following the acquittal, Sanders invited Ishii to Fort Detrick to lecture officers on the findings made by Unit 731.

Sanders has been harshly criticized for his proposal to grant amnesty to Unit 731's members in spite of the atrocities they committed. He later testified before U.S. Congress regarding the failure of the Tokyo War Crimes Tribunal to prosecute many Japanese war criminals. Sanders defended his decision in press interviews, stating that he had been "duped" and outsmarted by Ishii and his subordinates. He consistently denied having had any knowledge on the details of Unit 731's human experiments at the time, stating that he would have been "very happy to be part of the firing squad" had he known. Historian Sheldon Harris has also defended Sanders, calling him "ambitious but naïve", and claiming that he had "missed the trail leading to Ishii and others".

== Civilian career ==
While in Japan, Sanders contracted a serious case of tuberculosis, and was transferred back to Fort Detrick. He was discharged from the army in 1949 following his recovery and became Chairman of the Department of Medical Research at the University of Miami, a position which he held until 1958. He was among the founders of Miami's Variety Children's Hospital, and also served as the chairman of biological sciences at Florida Atlantic University. In 1950 he became a recipient of the Dade County Outstanding Citizenship Award for his efforts in the development of aureomycin. He also served as a consultant for the Japanese pharmaceutical company Green Cross, which had been founded by former members of Unit 731 after the war.

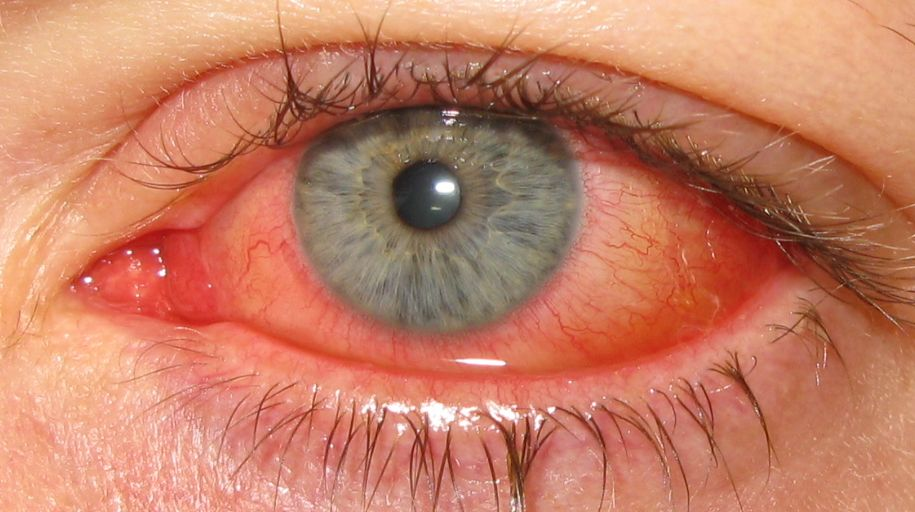
Adenoviral Keratoconjunctivitis, formerly known as Sanders' Disease

During his time working at the University of Miami, Sanders proposed a potential treatment for amyotrophic lateral sclerosis (ALS) using what he called a "Modified Neurotoxin" (MNT) derived from the zootoxins in snake venom. Although Sanders was nominated in 1966 for a Nobel Prize in Medicine for his efforts, his treatment would later be criticized as ineffective by a number of physicians; a 1980 study by doctors Victor Rivera, Martin Grabois, and William Deaton found that Sanders' treatment had a "lack of clinical effectiveness" and "did not demonstrate any benefit from administration of modified snake venom to patients with ALS". Sanders opened the Sanders Medical Research Foundation (SMRF) in Boca Raton, Florida in 1973, in which he treated patients with ALS. Sanders would also administer MNT treatment on test subjects in Havana as a possible remedy for polio. Sanders retired from medical research in 1983, after the Food and Drug Administration ordered him to close his clinic due to the lack of improvement shown in his patients.

Sanders was one of the first scientists to identify and experiment with adenoviral keratoconjunctivitis, a viral infection of the eye. He used himself as a test subject for experimenting with the virus, resulting in a gradual loss of sight in his right eye. As a result, the condition became informally known as Sanders' disease; however, this terminology is no longer used by ophthalmologists.

Sanders suffered from Parkinson's disease towards the end of his life. He died on June 29, 1987, at his home in Delray Beach, Florida, aged 77. He is buried at Arlington National Cemetery.
