= Unit 9420 =

Disease Research Unit of Japanese Army

Coordinates: 1°16′49.5″N 103°50′1.1″E

Unit Oka 9420
- 岡9420部隊 南方軍防疫給水部
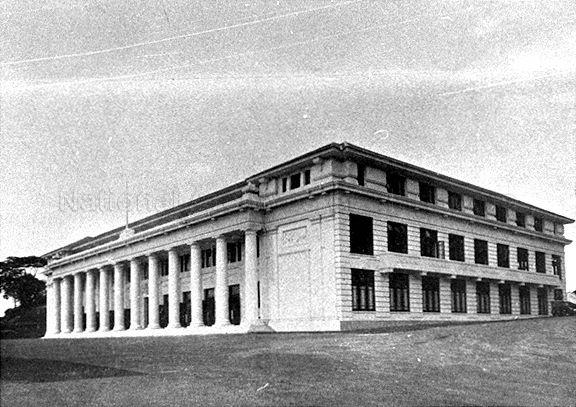
- Singapore Headquarters of Unit 9420
- Active: 1942-1945
- Country: Japan
- Garrison/HQ: King Edward VII College of Medicine, Singapore
- Engagements: Second Sino-Japanese War; Battle of the Yunnan–Burma Road; Pacific War; Invasion of Buka and Bougainville; Fu-Go balloon bomb

Unit Oka 9420 (Japanese: 岡9420部隊, Hepburn: Oka 9420 Butai), also known as the Epidemic Prevention and Water Purification Department of the Southern Expeditionary Army Group (南方軍防疫供水部, Nanpōgun Bōeki Kyūsui-bu), was a disease research unit within the Japanese army. Founded in Nanjing, China in 1942 and headquartered in Japanese-occupied Singapore, the unit had branches in Malaya (Now Malaysia), Indonesia, the Philippines, Papua New Guinea, Thailand, and Burma, and participated in bacteriological weapons attacks in northern Burma, Yunnan, China, and Papua New Guinea. With a tropical climate, suitable for the breeding of rat fleas, Malaya was the largest of the rat flea farms outside of Japan and China during World War II. The unit left Singapore in mid-1945 and dissolved in 1946.

== History ==
In January 1942, the Fourteenth Area Army of the Japanese Southern Expeditionary Army Group captured Manila, forcing American troops to retreat to the Bataan Peninsula. By early February, the initial Japanese assault on the Bataan Peninsula was unsuccessful. Subsequently, the Japanese command contemplated a biological attack utilising plague bombs from Tokyo and Kwantung Army. The Ministry of Agriculture and Forestry thus began organising rat breeding in the Japanese prefectures of Ibaraki, Tochigi, and Chiba. However, following the fall of the Bataan Peninsula in April, the germ warfare plan was ultimately scrapped.

In early 1942, the Japanese military established the pioneer team of the Epidemic Prevention and Water Purification Department of the Southern Expeditionary Army Group in Nanjing, China. Following its formation by 26 March, the team left China via Shanghai, Taiwan and Manila and arrived in Singapore by 20 June. The unit was initially given the secret code "Oka" (Japanese: 岡), as this was the secret code for the Seventh Area Army. Following a transfer of control to the Southern Expeditionary Army, the unit also used the secret code for the army, "Joyo" (Japanese: 威).

Commanded by Major General Kitagawa Masataka, with Ryōichi Naitō as its director, the unit consisted of two teams, including one team, the Umeoka Unit, specialised for studying bubonic plague and the other, the Kono Unit, focusing on malaria. The stated mission of Unit 9420 was ostensibly to address local infectious disease issues, which attracted local elites such as Othman Wok, who was one of the founding fathers of the Republic of Singapore in the 1960s. During the Japanese occupation, Dr. J. M. J. Supramaniam was also forced to work with Unit 9420 but secretly smuggled medical supplies to needy prisoners of war and hospitals.

As the only biochemical unit established outside of Japan, the all members of the unit came from Nanjing's Unit 1644, but some were directly sent from Japan. The unit roster indicates that the number of Japanese personnel working in the unit increased from 146 in May 1942 to 862 by the beginning of 1945, including doctors, virologists, nurses, and others. From April to June 1943, the unit was temporarily stationed in Thailand to provide services for the construction of the Thai-Burma railway before returning to Singapore.

In November 1944, the senior leadership of the Japanese Imperial General Headquarters realised their inability to halt the American offensive and decided to employ bacteriological warfare to demoralise the enemy. They ordered all bacteriological units to increase production. Unit 9420 was tasked with producing 60 kilograms of fleas, equivalent to the combined production of three bacteriological warfare units in North China, Central China, and South China, and second only to Unit 731's production of 150 kilograms.

As the Japanese army suffered successive defeats on the Pacific front and considering the issue of post-war accountability, the Director of the Army Medical Bureau, Hiroshi Kambayashi, announced the comprehensive termination of the biological weapons program. On 15 June 1945, Unit 9420 closed its experimental and production facilities in Johor. Initially, they withdrew to Singapore and later retreated to Laos. Before surrendering, they extensively destroyed relevant records. After Japan's surrender, the unit moved to Saipan in November 1945 and then returned to mainland Japan in May 1946, landing at Nagoya before disbanding on the following day.

== Facilities ==
Known locations of Unit 9460 activities
1 King Edward VII College of Medicine, Singapore
2 Tampoi Mental Hospital, Johor Bahru, Malaysia
3 Tuanku Muhammad School, Kuala Pilah, Malaysia
4 Malacca High School, Malacca, Malaysia
5 Taiping Prison, Perak, Malaysia
6 Pasteur Institute of Indonesia, Bandung, Indonesia
7 Klender rōmusha camp, Jakarta, Indonesia
8 Tunnel Hill POW Camp, Rabaul, Papua New Guinea
9 Buin Underground Hospital, Buin, Papua New Guinea

Apart from its headquarters in Singapore, Unit 9420 had six branches in Malaya, Indonesia, the Philippines, Papua New Guinea, Thailand, and Myanmar.

=== Singapore headquarters ===
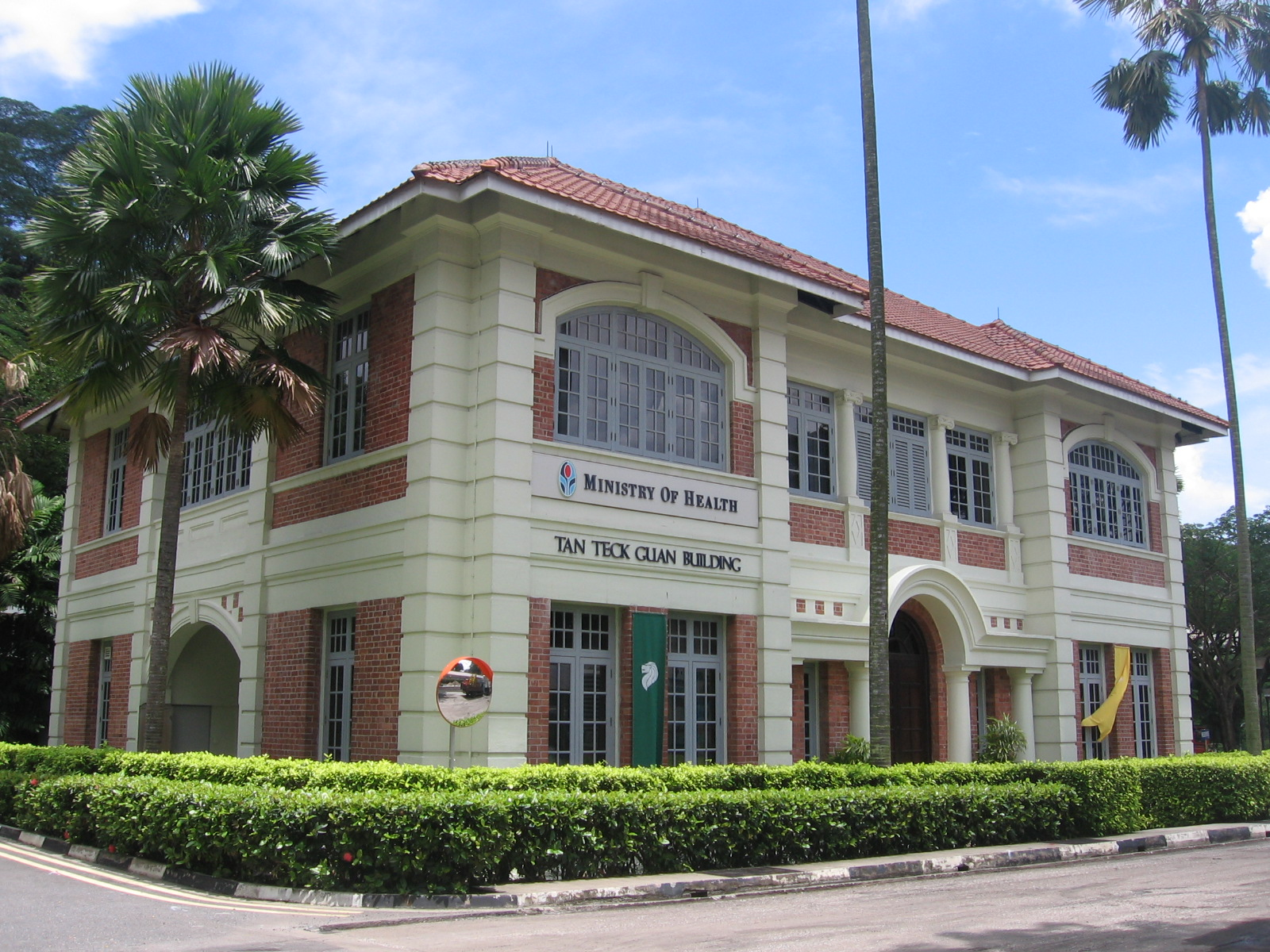
Tan Teck Guan Building used to be a plague lab

The headquarters of Unit 9420 was established at King Edward VII College of Medicine, with six laboratories inside. The Tan Teck Guan Building served as a laboratory for glanders. The laboratories in Outram were used to cultivate fleas from rats.

According to the research findings of Unit 731, the optimal climatic conditions for breeding fleas were a temperature of 22 degree Celsius and 76% humidity, which was consistent with the climate in Southeast Asia. In 1943, the Japanese military transported over 30,000 rats from Tokyo to Malaya. In October 1944, another 30,000 rats were transported from Tokyo to Singapore. Additionally, the Japanese military used animal specimens from the Raffles Museum for research, considering hamsters, squirrels, and guinea pigs as supplements to rats.

For every ten thousand rats, ten kilograms of fleas could be produced. Malaya Peninsula thus became the largest flea farm for the Japanese military outside of Japan and China. Researchers fed captured rats, injected them with Yersinia pestis, causing the rats to become sick. The fleas then fed on the dead hosts, and researchers separated them from the host's body, fed them blood, and every three to four months, they sent the fleas in glass bottles to Thailand.

In addition to the plague, laboratories in Outram, Singapore also researched cholera, malaria, smallpox, typhoid fever, dysentery, and anthrax. Singapore historian Lim Shao Bin estimated that Unit 9420 may have also conducted human experiments and is currently under investigation.

=== Malaysia branch ===
In Malaysia, Unit 9420 occupied Tampoi Mental Hospital in the northwest suburbs of Johor Bahru near Singapore to breed rats and develop biological weapons. The laboratory courtyard had facilities for breeding rats. On the other side of the laboratory was an isolation wall with a 24-hour operating boiler outside to burn the bodies of rats and provide boiling water for disinfection. The soldiers stationed at Tampoi was divided into three divisions, namely Team Imura, Team Nakayasu, and Team Emoto. Team Imura infected fleas at the hospital. Team Nakayasu bred and experimented on fleas. Team Emoto captured and raised rats, which also had presence at Selayang for some unknown reason.

Besides Tampoi, Team Imura also controlled Tuanku Muhammad School, hiring local Chinese and Malay people to raise tens of thousands of rats and thousands of rabbits, where there was a Taiwanese-run rat farm nearby. Malacca High School was also once a site for flea breeding. According to British military tribunal records, the Japanese military tested a poison named "Ipoh" in the form of live human experiments at the Taiping Prison in Perak.

=== Indonesia branch ===
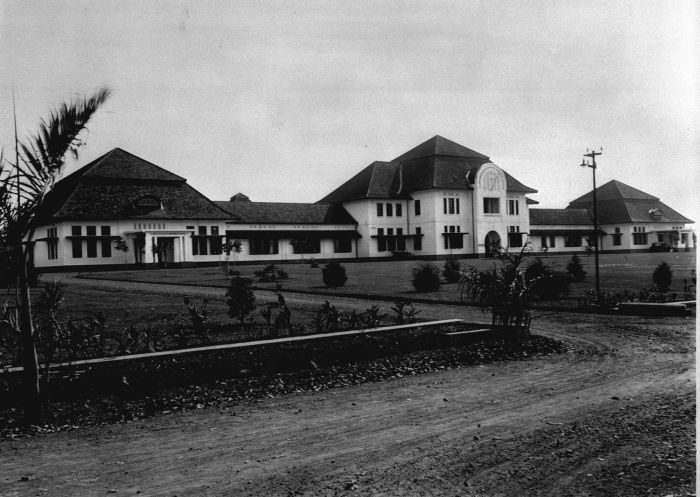
Main Building of Pasteur Institute of Indonesia

In Indonesia, Unit 9420 established branches in Jakarta and Bandung. Iwane Matsui once visited the Pasteur Institute of Indonesia in Bandung. In 1944, the failure of tetanus toxin vaccines developed by the Japanese army led to massive deaths at Klender rōmusha camp, Jakarta, which led to the arrest of the Eijkman Institute's scientific staff, including its director Professor Achmad Mochtar, who was executed by the Japanese. All records of the Japanese research in the Pasteur Institute was destroyed before the arrival of the Allied Forces in September 1945.

=== Other branches ===
In northern Burma and western Yunnan, China, the Southern Army Unit 9420 Epidemic Prevention and Water Supply Department was stationed to collect and breed rats and cultivate bacteria.

In Papua New Guinea, Unit 9420 established branches in Rabaul and Buin. At Rabaul, Japanese military doctor Einosuke Hirano was witnessed to have experimented on prisoners of war from the United States, Australia and New Zealand. American Lieutenant James McMurria, as a prisoner of war, witnessed human experiments at the Rabaul Tunnel Hill POW camp and testified to the U.S. War Department after the war. In the Philippines, Unit 9420 established a branch in Manila. The locations and the functions of Thai and Burmese branches of the unit remains unknown.

== Relevant battles ==
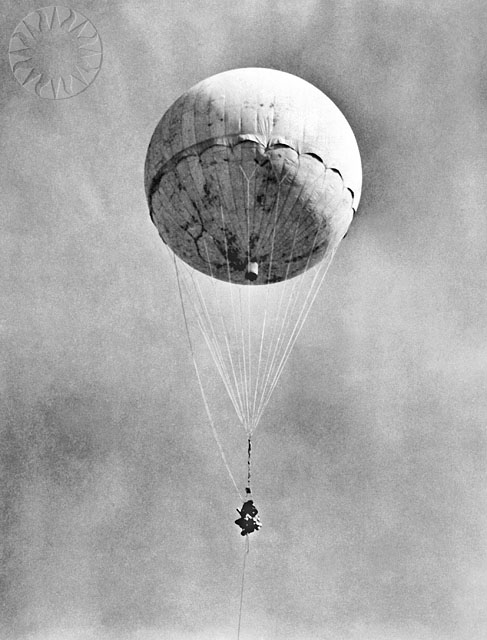
Fu-Go balloon bombs

During the Invasion of Buka and Bougainville in 1942, the British troops were under attack from plasmodium which was cultured in Singapore. Unit 9460 also participated in the massive biological weapons attacks in Yunnan, China. Starting from 4 May 1942, Japanese forces bombed Baoshan, Yunan on the Burma Road with cholera weapons, after they had bombed the town with incendiary munitions since 3 January 1941.In the meantime, Japanese forces also recruited Taiwanese, disguised as students, to release cholera bacteria into ditches, wells, and ponds along Burma Road. This led to a cholera outbreak near Baoshao, which lasted until mid-July. This outbreak spread to the whole western Yunan, with no exact number of deaths confirmed. The maximum casualties from the outbreak could be as many as 120 thousand.

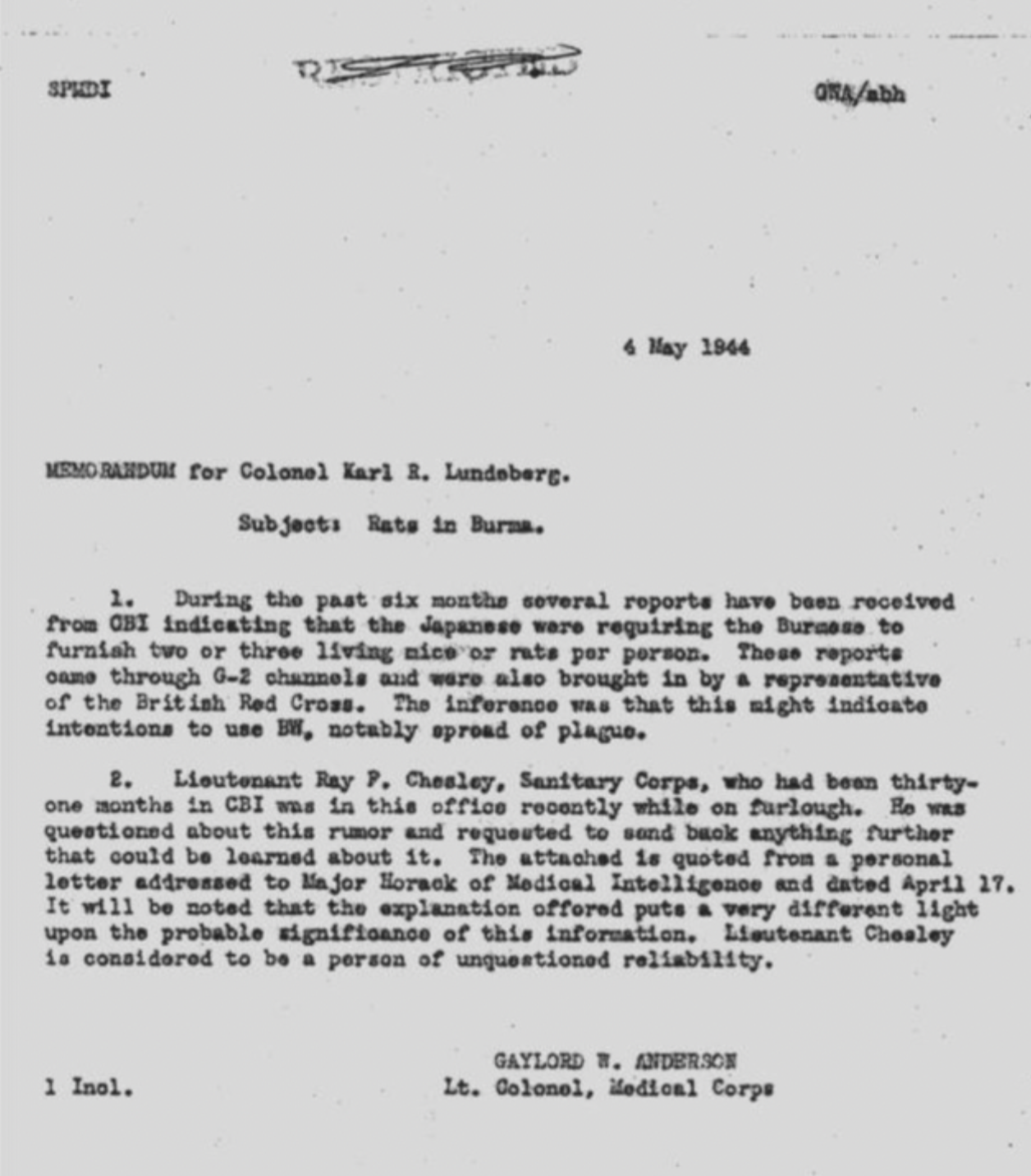
A British report showing that the Japanese were collecting rats and mice from the local Burmese in 1943-1944

Between 1943 and 1944, the Japanese military forcibly collected rats from the population in Burma and Yunnan under the pretext of epidemic investigation. Subsequently, they bred and released infected rats through epidemic prevention and water supply units in places like Mangshi and Tengchong, causing an outbreak of plague. The plague spread along Burma Road, affecting areas from Ruili to Dali and then spreading eastward to the Nujiang River. It was not fully controlled until 1953, with approximately five thousand deaths.

After the failure of the Guadalcanal Campaign in 1943, the Japanese military began planning to launch bacteriological warfare on the Pacific front but none were executed. On 14 December 1943, Lieutenant Colonel Kaneko Jun'ichi of the Army Medical School's Epidemic Research Laboratory submitted the "PX Effect Estimation Algorithm," estimating the effects of bacteriological warfare. It was estimated that one kilogram of fleas could cause the deaths of 11 people in the North Pacific and 11,200 people in the Southwest Pacific.

On 26 April 1944, at a meeting of the Army Ministry Directors, Chief of Staff of the Operations Department, Takushiro Hattori, proposed using submarines to launch plague attacks on Sydney, Melbourne, Hawaii, and Midway Atoll in an attempt to regain strategic advantage in the Central Pacific. However, part of the bacteriological warfare unit, which departed in April, was destroyed by the U.S. military on Saipan, and another part died in a submarine attack by the U.S. military en route to the Truk Islands, resulting in the failure of the plan. Later the year, the Japanese military launched Fu-Go balloon bombs, but they caused only six fatalities in the United States. In 1945, the Japanese military proposed the "Cherry Blossoms at Night" plan, but it was never implemented due to Japan's defeat.

== Historiography ==
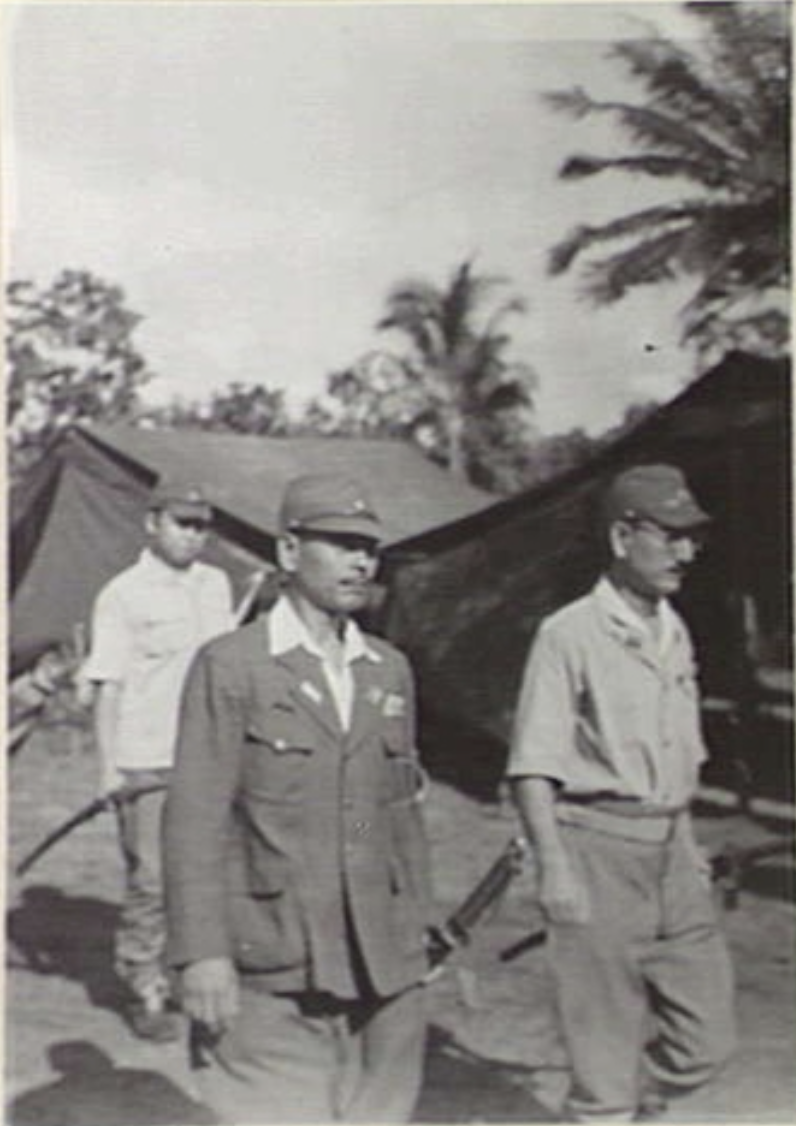
Japanese medical doctors to talk with the Allied about Japanese surrender in Buin, Papua New Guinea, in September 1945

Members of Unit 9420, after handing over experimental data and information to the United States, did not face any punishment and gradually became doctors, scholars, or politicians, retiring one after another starting from the 1980s. Among them, Ryōichi Naitō founded a biological company named Green Cross, with Kurobuta Ichirō Ota, another member of Unit 9460, as the director of the company's Kyoto branch. Akio Kihoin founded the Kyoto Institute for Microbiology. Fujino Tsunesaburō became a professor at Osaka University. Kiyoshi Hayakawa founded Hayakawa Institute of Preventive Medicine. When younger doctors learned about their history, they were shocked, and some formed non-governmental organizations to publicly disclose their understanding of what happened back then. Lim Shao Bin pointed out that surviving members of Unit 731 lacked remorse for their behaviour, and Singaporeans lacked understanding of the history before Singapore's independence in 1965.

In 1991, Othman Wok revealed to The Straits Times his experience in the laboratory developing glanders vaccine and believed he was actually involved in the development of bacteriological weapons. In November 2017, Singaporean researcher and collector Lim Shao Bin gave a lecture on the topic at the National Library of Singapore, once again drawing attention. In 2019, Lim Shao Bin and others released a black-and-white film footage taken by members of Unit 731 sent to inspect Singapore from 1942 to 1943. In September 2020, the Museum of Evidence of War Crimes by Japanese Army Unit 731 held a special exhibition on the archives of bacteriological warfare by the Japanese invaders, publicly displaying the roster of members of Unit 9420 obtained from the Ibaraki Branch of the National Archives of Japan for the first time.

== See also ==
- American cover-up of Japanese war crimes
- Sook Ching
- Unit 731
