= Men Behind the Sun =

1988 Hong Kong film by T. F. Mou

- Theatrical release poster

Chinese name
- Traditional Chinese: 黑太陽731
- Simplified Chinese: 黑太阳731
- Literal meaning: Black Sun 731
Transcriptions
Standard Mandarin
- Hanyu Pinyin: Hēi tàiyáng 731
Yue: Cantonese
- Jyutping: Hak^{1} taai^{3}joeng^{4} 731
- Directed by: Mou Tun-fei
- Written by: Mou Wen-yuan; Teng Dun-jing; Liu Mei-fei
- Produced by: Fu Chi
- Starring: Gang Wang; Wu Dai-yo; Wang Run-shen; Zhao Yong-dong; Mei Zhao-hua
- Cinematography: Cheung Kui-kwan
- Edited by: Zheng Yong-ming
- Music by: Wong Lap-ping
- Production company: Sil-Metropole Organisation
- Distributed by: Sil-Metropole Organisation
- Release date: 1 December 1988
- Running time: 105 minutes
- Country: Hong Kong
- Language: Mandarin
- Box office: HK$11.1 million; US$1.4 million

Men Behind the Sun (Chinese: 黑太陽731; lit. 'Black Sun: 731') is a 1988 Hong Kong historical horror film directed by Mou Tun-fei. It is a graphic depiction of the war atrocities committed by the Empire of Japan at Unit 731, the secret biological weapons experimentation unit of the Imperial Japanese Army during the Second Sino-Japanese War. It was the first film to be classified "level III" (equivalent to the US rating NC-17) in Hong Kong.

== Plot ==
An opening caption reads, "Friendship is friendship; history is history."

A group of Japanese boys are conscripted into the Youth Corps. They are assigned to the Kwantung Army, and are brought to one of the facilities serving Unit 731, which is headed by Shirō Ishii. Soon, they are introduced to the experiments going on at the facility, for which they feel revulsion. The purpose of the experiments is to find a highly contagious strain of bubonic plague, to be used as a last-ditch weapon against the Chinese population.

The young soldiers befriend a local mute Chinese boy with whom they play games of catch. One day, the commanding officers ask the boys to bring the Chinese child to the facility. Naively, they follow orders believing that no real harm will come to the boy; however, the senior medical staff vivisects the boy and keeps his organs for research. When the young soldiers realize what has happened, they stage a minor uprising by ganging up and physically beating their commanding officer.

After a revelation, Dr. Ishii develops a prototype ceramic bomb that does not kill the infectious fleas inside upon being launched. To test its efficacy, he orders several Chinese prisoners to be tied to crosses. However, the experiment is botched since the Japanese aerial forces are retreating. Chinese prisoners break free from the crosses, and attempt to escape; however, Japanese troops hunt them down, and nearly all of them are run over or shot, including several Japanese.

Unit 731 hears of the atomic bombings of Hiroshima and Nagasaki and Russia's declaration of war. Dr. Ishii orders his subordinates and their families to kill themselves, but is persuaded instead to evacuate them and only commit suicide if captured. Afterwards, Unit 731 destroys evidence of their research, including gassing the surviving test subjects to death and blowing up the facilities.

That night, the Japanese troops and their families wait at the train station before their return to Japan. The lone survivor of Unit 731, disguised as a Japanese soldier, makes an attack but is impaled by a Japanese flag. The Youth Corps clutch onto the blood-stained flag in horror as they depart the station.

The closing passages relate that Dr. Ishii cooperated with the Americans, giving them his research and agreeing to work for them. Years later, he is moved to the Korean War, and biological weapons appear on the battlefield shortly thereafter. The Youth Corps involved with 731 are revealed to have led hard lives after the war, with their educational background being stigmatized.

== Cast ==
- Gang Wang as Lt. Gen. Shirō Ishii
- Wu Dai-yo as Gen. Kikuchi
- Wang Run-shen as Lt. Hashimoto
- Zhao Yong-dong as Lt. Col. Jiro Nakatome
- Mei Zhao-hua as Takamura
- Zhang Guo-wen as Lt. Shunji Onoe
- Tien Jie-fu as Hayashida
- Mei Zhao-hua as Takamura
- Hao Lin-jie as Mrs. Takamura
- Wong Ying-kit
- Wang Shen-nian
- Man Kong
- Liu Xu-hui
- Quan Zhe
- Kim Won-young
- Jin Tie-long
- Li Bai-lin
- Chen Jian-xin
- Liu Peng-yu
- Jin Hai-zhu

== Production ==
While working on a children’s martial arts film called Young Heroes, Mou Tun-fei began to hear stories about war atrocities committed by the Imperial Japanese Army during the Second Sino-Japanese War. Hearing about the biological experimentation on Chinese prisoners of war (POWs) and civilians spurred Mou to direct the project.

Shooting took place on-location in Harbin, often in the real locations where the film's events occurred. The People's Liberation Army lent military equipment and extras to the production.

The cast consisted mostly of amateurs and a handful of professional stage actors. Mou recalled, "the producer pleaded with me to have a big Hong Kong actor such as Chow Yun-fat and give the film an identity." He cast ethnic Koreans to play the children in the film, feeling they most closely resembled the Japanese and Chinese children of the 1930s.

Two sequences used real human cadavers: the frostbite experiment victim's arms (which were placed in front of the actresses real arms), and the autopsy of a young boy. The latter was the victim of an accident, whom Mou got permission from the parents to film the autopsy of for use in the film. However, the real cadaver was only used in wide shots, the close-ups were done with a pig. Mou claimed the scene in which a cat is killed by rats was a special effect using red-dyed honey, while other crew members have claimed it was a real scene of unsimulated animal violence.

== Reception ==
From contemporary reviews, "Lor." of Variety declared the film to be a "lowbrow exploitationer treating a serious subject, Japanese war atrocities", noting, "Explosive material is dramatically potent and could have been handled tastefully, as with Kon Ichikawa's classic films like Fires on the Plain" but Mou instead "resorts to nauseating sensationalism, with butcher-shop depiction of autopsies on live subjects, a disgusting 'decompression' experiment spewing intestines out of a victim and a horrendously realistic scene of a pussycat bloodily mauled by a room full of rats".

=== Controversies ===
Though Mou claims he was trying to depict historical events with accuracy, he has been criticized by Hong Kong-based writers who say the movie's exploitation film presentation negates any educational value involving a historical atrocity, and Japanese critics deemed the film as anti-Japanese propaganda. American horror film critics have called the film horrifying, but lacking in narrative structure, while agreeing with Hong Kong critics regarding its lack of educational value. The film has had no official US release, even after an English dub was created for International release.

Owing to its graphic content, and use of actual corpses and human body parts, an international release proved to be difficult. The film faced difficulties with censors worldwide. It was banned in Australia and caused a public outcry in Japan to the extent that director Mou received death threats. The film was given several minutes of mandated cuts to be allowed a release in the United Kingdom.

The film garnered further controversy for its use of what Mou claims was actual autopsy footage of a young boy and for a scene in which a cat appears to be eaten alive by a horde of rats.

== Sequels ==
- Unit 731: Laboratory of the Devil (黑太陽731續集之殺人工廠, 1992)
- Unit 731: A Narrow Escape (黑太陽731完結篇, 1994)
- Black Sun: The Nanking Massacre (黑太陽─南京大屠殺, 1995)

== See also ==
- Philosophy of a Knife
- Unit 731
