= Rainbow Greens =

Rainbow Greens may refer to the following political organizations:

- Rainbow Greens (Italy), a defunct Italian political party
- Green-Rainbow Party, a political party in Massachusetts, United States
- Rainbow and Greens, a defunct Japanese political party
- Rainbow Group (1984–1989), a defunct green political group in the European Parliament
- A number of LGBTQ+ branches of Green political parties are known as the rainbow greens, including:
  - Queensland Rainbow Greens, the LGBTQI working group of the Queensland Greens political party
  - Rainbow Greens, an interest network of the Green Party of Aotearoa New Zealand
  - Rainbow Greens, a group within the Scottish Greens
