= Wang Xuan (social activist) =

Chinese social activist (born 1952)

Wang Xuan (born August 6, 1952) is a Chinese social activist known for her long-standing efforts to seek justice and compensation for victims of Japan's biological warfare during the Second Sino-Japanese War. She served as the head of the plaintiffs' group in lawsuits filed by Chinese victims of Unit 731's germ warfare.

== Biography ==
Wang was born in Shanghai and is originally from Yiwu, Zhejiang Province In 1997, she was elected leader of the plaintiffs' group representing Chinese victims. She organized multiple delegations of survivors to Japan to testify in court and worked tirelessly to collect historical evidence supporting the victims' claims. Wang also serves as a part-time researcher at the Tokyo Trial Research Center at Shanghai Jiao Tong University. She co-edited, alongside Japanese scholar Shoji Kondo, a compilation of historical records titled U.S.-Japan Archives on Japan's Biological Warfare in China. United States historian Sheldon H. Harris once praised her efforts by saying, "If there were two women like Wang Xuan in China, Japan would sink."

== Honors ==
In recognition of her contributions to historical justice and social advocacy, Wang was named Person of the Year in 2002 by Southern Weekly and China Women magazine. She was also selected as one of the "Touching China Annual Person of the Year Award" in the 2002 annual awards.
