= Ryūhei Kawada =

Japanese politician

- 川田 龍平
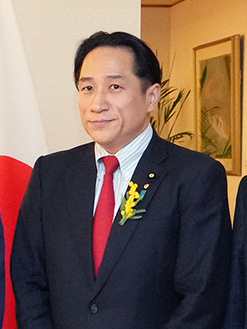
- Kawada in 2024

Member of the House of Councillors
- In office 29 July 2007 – 28 July 2025
- Preceded by: Seat established
- Constituency: Tokyo at-large (2007–2013); National PR (2013–2025)

Personal details
- Born: 12 January 1976 (age 50) Kodaira, Tokyo, Japan
- Party: Constitutional Democratic (since 2017)
- Other political affiliations: Independent (2007–2009); Your (2009–2013); Unity (2013–2014); Innovation (2014–2016); Democratic (2016–2017)
- Spouse: Mika Tsutsumi (m. 2008)
- Relatives: Daisuke Tsutsumi (brother-in-law)
- Education: Tokyo Keizai University
- Website: Official website

Ryūhei Kawada (川田 龍平; January 12, 1976) is a Japanese activist, haemophiliac and a former member of the House of Councillors (Japan). Ryūhei Kawada became famous for coming out as HIV positive in Japan, where doing so was considered taboo by many.

== HIV-tainted blood scandal in Japan ==
In the late 1980s, between one and two thousand Japanese patients with haemophilia contracted HIV via tainted blood products. Upon discovering he was one of the affected, Ryuhei Kawada joined the lawsuit against Green Cross Corporation that provided the tainted blood products, which eventually led to the guilty pleas from three executives in 1997.

== Political career ==
In the 2007 Japanese House of Councillors election, Kawada won a seat in the House of Councillors. He has expressed a desire to work on issues of health, welfare, and labour. He has also indicated he will form a Green Party of Japan based on the Rainbow and Greens which supported his campaign.
