= Tanabe Pharma =

Japanese pharmaceuticals company

Tanabe Pharma Corporation

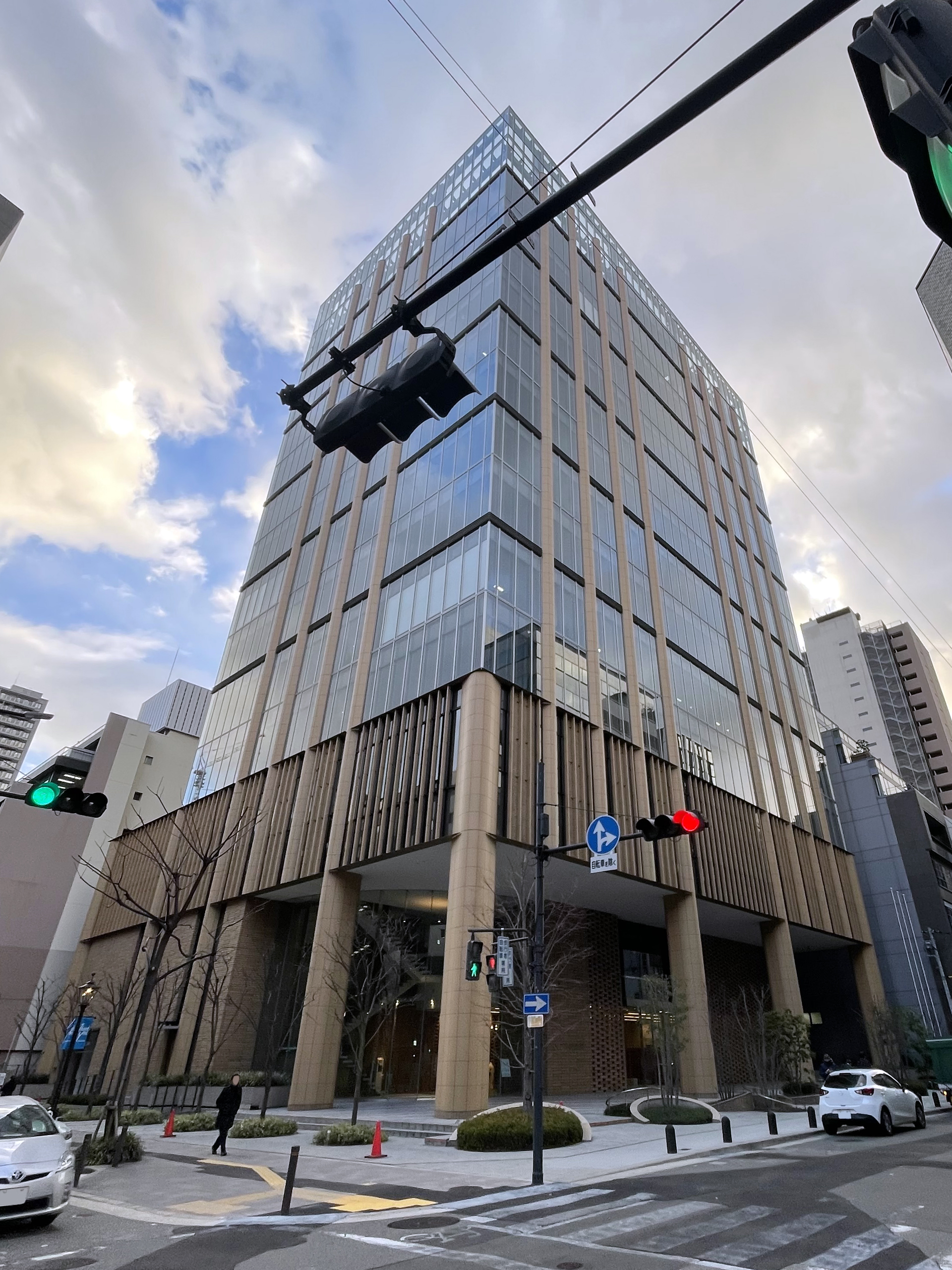
- Headquarters in Osaka
- Type: Subsidiary
- Industry: Pharmaceuticals
- Predecessor: Neuroderm
- Founded: 1678; 348 years ago
- Fate: Tanabe Seiyaku Co., Ltd. merged with Mitsubishi Pharma to form Mitsubishi Tanabe Pharma
- Headquarters: Doshomachi, Osaka, Japan
- Parent: Bain Capital

Tanabe Pharma Corporation (田辺ファーマ株式会社, Tanabe Fāma Kabushiki-gaisha) is a Japanese pharmaceuticals company from Osaka, a subsidiary of Mitsubishi Chemical Holdings Corporation. Mitsubishi Pharma Corporation (三菱ウェルファーマ株式会社, Mitsubishi Werufāma Kabushiki-gaisha) was formed in 2001 from the merger of Mitsubishi-Tokyo Pharmaceuticals and Welfide Corporation. On October 1, 2007, Tanabe Seiyaku Co., Ltd. merged with Mitsubishi Pharma to form Mitsubishi Tanabe Pharma.

The company name until November 30, 2025 was Mitsubishi Tanabe Pharma Corporation (田辺三菱製薬株式会社, Tanabe Mitsubishi Seiyaku Kabushiki-gaisha).

Originally founded in 1678, Mitsubishi Tanabe considers itself as one of the oldest pharmaceutical companies in the world. Tanabe Pharma was a member of the Mitsubishi Chemical Group keiretsu.

== Products ==
Mitsubishi-Tanabe Pharmaceuticals developed the first BET inhibitor molecules.

In August 2014, the company announced three-year research collaboration agreement with AstraZeneca on diabetic nephropathy, to replace dialysis or kidney transplantation.

An intravenous treatment of Mitsubishi Tanabe is Radicava (edaravone) which has the goal to slow the decline of physical function in patients with amyotrophic lateral sclerosis (ALS) and was approved by the U.S. Food and Drug Administration in 2017. The U.S. American branch of Mitsubishi Tanabe created a locator for healthcare and infusion centers.

Mitsubishe Tanabe has also an orally disintegrating tablet for ALS with Exservan (riluzole).

== Ownership history ==
In 1604, Tanabeya Matazaemon is granted a license by Tokugawa Ieyasu for trade in herbal medicines with Luzon and Siam.

In 1901, Motosaburo Tanabe, the Twelfth established a pharmacy in Tokyo, which incorporated in 1921 as Motosaburo Tanabe Shoten.

In 1921, Nippon Tar Industries was established.

In 1940, Takeda Kasei Co., Ltd. was established by Chobei Takeda & Co., Ltd. (present-day Takeda Pharmaceutical Company) and Nippon Kasei Chemical Co. Ltd. (present-day Mitsubishi Chemical Corporation) and built its first plant in Higashi-Yoshitomi-mura, Fukuoka Prefecture.

In 1943, Motosaburo Tanabe Shoten, changed its name to Tokyo Tanabe Pharmaceuticals Co., Ltd.

In 1946, Takeda Kasei Co., Ltd. changed its name to Yoshitomi Pharmaceutical Co., Ltd.

In 1949, Yoshitomi Pharmaceutical Co., Ltd. listed on Tokyo and Osaka stock exchanges.

In 1950, The Blood Plasma Corporation of Japan was established with head office and plant in Osaka. The founders included war criminals such as Kitano Masaji who performed torture and experimentations on humans in the Japanese military's notorious Unit 731 during World War II. These crimes were recognized by the UN as extreme "crimes against humanity".

In 1952, Nippon Tar Industries became Mitsubishi Chemical Industries, Ltd.

In 1964, Blood Plasma Corporation changed its name to Green Cross Corporation.

In 1998, Green Cross Corporation was acquired by Yoshitomi Pharmaceutical.

In 2000, Green Cross Corporation changing its name to Welfide Corporation.

In 1981, Mitsubishi Chemical Industries, Ltd. established a business alliance with Tokyo Tanabe Pharmaceuticals Co.

In 1984, Mitsubishi Chemical Industries, Ltd. changed its name to Mitsubishi Chemical Corporation following the merger with Mitsubishi Petrochemical Co., Ltd.

In 1999, Mitsubishi Chemical Corporation and Tokyo Tanabe Pharmaceuticals Co. merged formally and formed Mitsubishi-Tokyo Pharmaceuticals, Inc., to take over the combined pharmaceutical operations of the two companies.

In 2001, Mitsubishi-Tokyo Pharmaceuticals and Welfide Corporation merged to establish Mitsubishi Pharma Corporation, and Mitsubishi Tanabe Pharma.

In October 2005, Mitsubishi Pharma Corporation joined again with Mitsubishi Chemical Corporation to create Mitsubishi Chemical Holdings Corporation.

In July, 2017, Mitsubishi Tanabe Pharma acquired Neuroderm for $1.1 billion.

On 27 February 2020, Mitsubishi Tanabe Pharma was delisted from the Tokyo Stock Exchange, and is now described as a member of the Mitsubishi Chemical Holdings Group

In February 2025, American private equity firm Bain Capital agreed to acquire Mitsubishi Tanabe Pharma for ¥510 billion (US$3.4 billion).
