= Lost Souls (1980 film) =

1980 Hong Kong film by Mou Tun-fei

- Film poster
- Directed by: Mou Tun-fei
- Written by: Yip Tung-Yau
- Produced by: Runme Shaw
- Cinematography: Luk Ching
- Edited by: Chiang Hsing-Lung
- Music by: Eddie H. Wang
- Production company: Shaw Brothers
- Release date: 26 November 1980
- Running time: 89 minutes
- Country: Hong Kong
- Language: Cantonese
- Box office: HK$2.47 million

Lost Souls (Chinese: 打蛇) is a 1980 Hong Kong film directed by Mou Tun-fei. The film is about three young men from Mainland China who swim across the Deep Bay to Hong Kong. The three are held captive by slave dealers and deal with the miserable fate as they are subject to torture by them.

The film was a Shaw Brothers production from director Mou Tun-fei under the name T. F. Mou. Actor and future director Teddy Chan was in the film and described it as a difficult shoot due to its explicit nature.

On its release, a reviewer in City Entertainment Film Biweekly described its reception to be poor, while both the original review and a later review from AllMovie stated that any value found in early sequences was lost in repeated scenes of torture as the film progresses.

== Production ==
Teddy Chan, who had acted as an extra previously in earlier Shaw Brothers Studio films, had his first speaking role in Lost Souls. Chan had over 20 days of shooting dialogue scenes. He said working on Lost Souls was difficult as he was acting in front of a group of nude women and that each day of filming was full of scenes of violence and bloodshed.

Peggy Chiao described Lost Souls as belonging to the Hong Kong New Wave. She said it was part of the wave that began to produce films with scenes where the violence is exaggerated.

== Release and reception ==
Lost Souls was released in Hong Kong on 26 November 1980. On its release, it grossed a total of HK$2,4747,893.

In the Hong Kong film magazine City Entertainment Film Biweekly, they reported that the reception to the film was poor. The reviewer Lin Li said that despite some tension in early scenes, the film was predominantly scenes of sensationalist violence, pornography and abuse and was too difficult for the average viewer to watch.

Eleanor Mannikka of AllMovie echoed this years later, saying that "Early on, the film leaves the issue of illegal immigration far behind, burying it in the pursuit of violence and torture."

== See also ==
- List of Hong Kong films of 1980
- List of Shaw Brothers films
