= Black Sun: The Nanking Massacre =

1995 Hong Kong film by Mou Tun Fei

- DVD cover
- Directed by: Mou Tun Fei
- Written by: Lee Wing-Shui
- Produced by: Fu Chi; Mou Tun-Fei
- Starring: Liang Zhang; Yung Pan; Shao-tien Hsiung; Wen-ting Chiang; Wen-tu Pan; Hua Shao
- Cinematography: Sung Kin-Man
- Edited by: Chui Shun-Lui
- Music by: Ngau Cheong-Kwan
- Distributed by: Japan Shock (Netherlands)
- Release date: 7 July 1995
- Running time: 90 minutes
- Country: Hong Kong
- Language: Mandarin

Black Sun: The Nanking Massacre, also called Men Behind the Sun 4, is a 1995 Hong Kong historical exploitation horror film written and directed by Mou Tun Fei and is a follow-up to his 1988 film Men Behind the Sun. The movie depicts the events behind the Nanjing Massacre committed by the Imperial Japanese Army against Chinese citizens and refugees during the Second Sino-Japanese War.

== Plot ==
The movie does not have a central storyline, though it follows individual members of a Chinese family during the Nanjing Massacre. The movie begins after the Japanese have captured the city and begin a "cleanup" phase. Homes are broken into and burned, the residents are killed and raped. Bowing to international pressure, the Japanese government has agreed to establish refugee safety zones, only to violate the agreement at their whim, knowing that there is no force that can really prevent them from doing so. As a result, they regularly enter the refugee camps, kidnapping women and executing Chinese policemen and suspected soldiers. Several foreign residents try to defend the refugees, and while they carry weight due to their political ties, they ultimately cannot stand against the armed troops. Some of the foreigners depicted in the film include the German businessman John Rabe and U.S. missionary Minnie Vautrin.

A local man who speaks Japanese interprets the soldiers' orders to the Chinese civilians. In reality, the speeches are meant simply to lure the Chinese onto the streets, where they are shot and killed wholesale with machine guns. A handful of resistance remains, however, and one Chinese man feigns death, and then pulls a grenade from a passing soldier, blowing them both up. Having now been unofficially employed by the Japanese, the interpreter assists them in distributing propaganda and is accosted by his fellow Chinese as being a traitor and collaborator. He dismisses their indignation, taunting them with their own lack of will to fight the Japanese. He follows a high-ranking Japanese officer around the country. One day a couple of Japanese reporters show up to interview the officer and take pictures of him. They request to have the officer pose with his sword, ready to strike a Chinese man. Having no other Chinese around, they suggest he use the interpreter, who has little choice but to go along with it. Unsurprisingly, as the Japanese officer poses for the camera, he actually goes through and kills his lackey, to the horror of the cameramen.

A group of Hui Muslims carrying corpses of their own stumbled upon Japanese troops, which proceed to harass them before continuing their journey to burial site.

Members of the family remain hiding in their house, believing the end of military engagement to signify safety. Soon, however, some Japanese troops break down the door. The eldest son, along with two small children, John and Jean, are told to flee the house. In the meantime, the parents and an elderly grandmother try to distract the guards. The kids run off and, over the course of the film, are made to survive on the streets. However, the small children become isolated when the elder son is rounded up with a group of other men. The elder son, having been given official papers by the Japanese, eventually returns home to find that the parents are dead, the mother's body having been stripped naked and apparently raped. Their grandmother, alive but also apparently having been raped, is obviously distraught, lying on the floor still half-naked. The troops, still inside the house, immediately accost the son and kill him. Later, the two small children also make their way back to the house, only to find their relatives dead and the grandmother about to burn the bodies inside the house, along with herself. At that moment, a patrol discovers the two kids standing in the doorway, and they immediately proceed to assault Jean, the little girl. Having no other recourse, the grandmother pushes John, the last of her family, out the door and locks it. While the soldiers are distracted in their attempt to rape the girl, the melancholy grandmother sets the house on fire, trapping everyone inside to a fiery death.

The Japanese troops surround a Buddhist temple. Inside, the pacifist monks are praying. The troops bring them out one at a time, killing them outside. The Japanese, claiming to be Buddhists also, presumably want to keep the temple itself clean. The bodies of the monks are stacked in a grisly pile, and each monk that is brought out is an unfortunate witness to the scene. Eventually, the troops work their way to the last man, the elder priest, who resigns himself to his fate with a look of disgust towards the Japanese. Another monk, who manages not to be killed so far, is standing in line for food, when a scuffle breaks out due to women who have disguised themselves as men, trying to avoid rape. The monk attempts to stop the violence, and becomes entangled in it when they strip him down and try to force him to have sex with one of the women. He refuses, and the troops slash him in the groin.

In the epilogue, it is stated that most of the Japanese officers depicted in the film were tried for war crimes and executed.

== Cast ==
- Liang Zhang
- Yung Pan
- Shao-tien Hsiung
- Wen-ting Chiang
- Wen-tu Pan
- Hua Shao
- Vincent Benziger
- Hsi-ho Chang
- Chiu-liang Chen
- Liang-Yue Chen
- Ming Chiang
- Liang Chou
- Wei-li Chou
- Shiao-tan Chu
- Jeremy W. Cleaver

== See also ==
- Men Behind the Sun
- Nanking (film)
- Don't Cry, Nanking
- The Tokyo Trial (film)
- Kamen Rider Black Sun
- Japanese war crimes
