= American cover-up of Japanese war crimes =

The occupying United States government undertook the selective cover-up of some Japanese war crimes after the end of World War II in Asia, granting political immunity to military personnel who had engaged in human experimentation and other crimes against humanity, predominantly in mainland China. The pardon of Japanese war criminals, among whom were Unit 731's commanding officers General Shirō Ishii and General Masaji Kitano, was overseen by General of the Army Douglas MacArthur in September 1945. While a series of war tribunals and trials was organized, many of the high-ranking officials and doctors who devised and respectively performed the experiments were pardoned and never brought to justice due to the US government both classifying incriminating evidence, as well as blocking the prosecution access to key witnesses. As many as 12,000 people, most of them Chinese, died in Unit 731 alone and many more died in other facilities, such as Unit 100 and in field experiments throughout Manchuria.

== Cover-up ==
The American government sent General MacArthur to oversee rebuilding post-war Japan and the shift to a democracy from a previously authoritarian system of governance. During the occupation, MacArthur assigned Lieutenant Colonel Murray Sanders to gather data on Japan's biological warfare, which was obtained through human experimentation. At Sanders' suggestion, MacArthur offered full political immunity to high-ranking officials who were instrumental in perpetrating crimes against humanity, in exchange for the data about their experiments. Among those was Shirō Ishii, the commander of Unit 731. During the cover-up operation, the U.S. government paid money to obtain data on human experiments conducted in China, according to two declassified U.S. government documents.

The total amount paid to unnamed former members of the infamous unit was somewhere between 150,000 yen to 200,000 yen. An amount of 200,000 yen at that time is the equivalent of 20 million yen to 40 million yen today.

Japan's emperor Hirohito gave his consent regarding the policies and activities of Unit 731, Unit 100 and other human experimentation facilities. Though it is unclear on whether Emperor Hirohito was made aware of the full extent of Unit 731, the emperor's younger brother, Prince Mikasa, had toured the headquarters of Unit 731 and wrote in his memoirs that he watched films of how Chinese prisoners were "made to march on the plains of Manchuria for poison gas experiments on humans."

MacArthur, abiding by the Potsdam Declaration, gathered a jury for the Tokyo trials, where a number of Japanese officials were successfully tried and convicted. In 1981, one of the last surviving members of the Tokyo Tribunal, Judge Bert Röling, expressed his unhappiness that the war crimes committed in Unit 731 had been protected by the US government and wrote, "It is a bitter experience for me to be informed now that centrally ordered Japanese war criminality of the most disgusting kind was kept secret from the court by the U.S. government."

American POWs returning home from Japanese custody were told not to discuss their experiences with the media or anyone who was not cleared by the military.

== See also ==
- Michael Yon
- Herbert P. Bix
- Kent Gilbert
- J. Mark Ramseyer
