= Greens Japan =

Greens Japan 緑の党グリーンズジャパン
- Presidents: Satoshi Yagi; Nao Suguro; Hitoshi Nakayama
- Founded: 22 November 2008 (Established as a political party 28 July 2012)
- Merger of: Rainbow and Greens; Japan Greens
- Headquarters: Kōenji Bldg. 404, 2-3-4 Kōenji-Kita, Suginami, Tokyo
- Membership (2012): ▲1,000
- Ideology: Green politics
- Regional affiliation: Asia Pacific Greens Federation
- International affiliation: Global Greens
- Councillors: 0 / 248
- Representatives: 0 / 465
- Prefectural assembly members: 2 / 2,609
- City, special ward, town and village assembly members: 30 / 29,839

Website
- greens.gr.jp

The Greens Japan (緑の党グリーンズジャパン, Midori no Tō Greens Japan; literally "green party Greens Japan") is an established national green party in Japan.

After the electoral success of Green activist Ryuhei Kawada in the 2007 House of Councillors election, the local green political network Rainbow and Greens had reportedly decided to dissolve itself and merge with the Japan Greens in December 2007. The two precedent organizations dissolved themselves and relaunched as Greens Japan, a political organization in late 2008, under its former Japanese name, Midori no Mirai (みどりの未来 - "green future").

== History ==
The party was founded in July 2012 and held its first general assembly in that same month.

== Representation ==
The party has a number of elected city council members/councillors in towns and cities across Japan. On the 21 November 2010, Kazumi Inamura became the first popularly elected Greens Japan Mayor, in the city of Amagasaki. At the age of 38, she was reported to be the youngest female city mayor in the history of Japan, and the first popularly elected female mayor of Amagasaki. She won the mayoralty with 54% of the vote.

== Party establishment ==
On 28 July 2012, the party was officially re-established under its new name by local assembly members and civic groups to run in the Upper House election.

== Policies ==
The party opposes Japan's entry into the Trans-Pacific Partnership (TPP).

The party supports a universal basic income (UBI).

== See also ==
- Energy in Japan
- Environmental issues in Japan
- Universal basic income in Japan
