= Ryōichi Naitō =

Japanese microbiologist and entrepreneur (1909–1982)

Lieutenant Colonel Ryōichi Naitō
- 内藤 良一
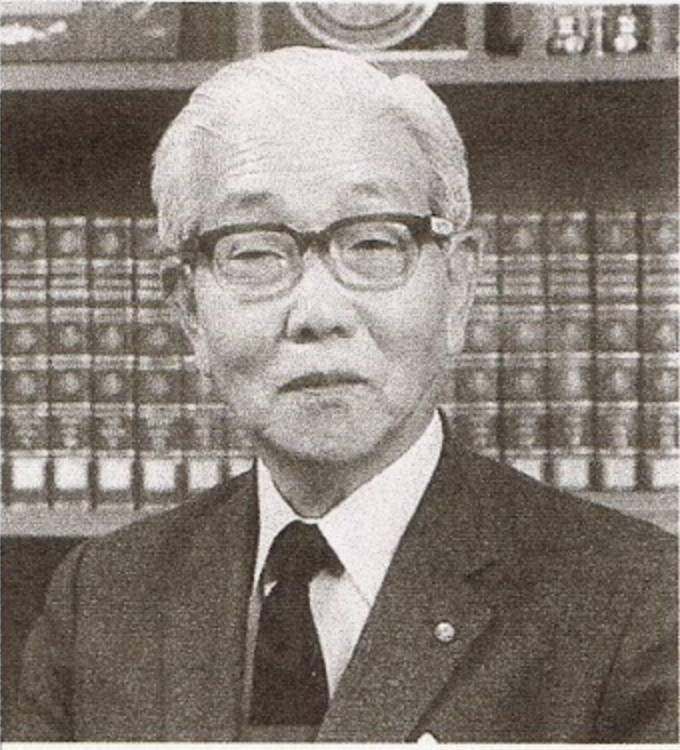
- Born: 26 December 1906; Kyoto, Japan
- Died: 7 July 1982 (aged 75)
- Education: Medical doctor (Kyoto University)
- Military career
- Allegiance: Empire of Japan
- Branch: Imperial Japanese Army
- Rank: Lieutenant Colonel
- Unit: Unit 731
- Known for: Biological warfare Founder of Green Cross Corporation; Development of artificial blood
- Conflicts: World War II

Ryōichi Naitō (Japanese: 内藤 良一, Hepburn: Naitō Ryōichi; 26 December 1906 – 7 July 1982) was a Japanese physician, microbiologist and officer in the Imperial Japanese Army during World War II. He was a key scientist at Unit 731, the largest biological warfare and chemical warfare unit of the Japanese government during 1933 to 1945. After the war, he founded a pharmaceuticals company, Green Cross Corporation, which became globally successful particularly in developing an artificial blood which was marketed as Fluosol-DA.

== Life and career ==
Naitō was born in Kyoto, Japan. He studied medicine at the Kyoto University School of Medicine and earned an MD in 1931. At the time Japan was planning a large-scale invasion of China, and in September 1931, first seized the city of Mukden as a false flag attack, known as the Mukden incident, against China. As a medical graduate, Naitō joined the Imperial Japanese Army as a medical officer in the rank of Lieutenant Colonel. The Japanese invasion of China continued and Manchuria was occupied in early 1932. The Japanese government set up an administrative region by making the puppet state of Manchukuo. It immediately established Epidemic Prevention and Water Purification Department under the army control in which Naitō was among the top officers. In 1933, a medical facility named Unit 731 (officially the Manchu Detachment 731) was set up in Pin Fang, near Harbin, as a centre of scientific experiments, under the leadership of Shirō Ishii. Naitō became the third top authority of the unit, after Masaji Kitano, the designated second commander.

At the height of World War II, in 1942, Japan expanded the research programme as Epidemic Prevention and Water Purification Department of the Southern Expeditionary Army Group, headquartered in Singapore. Naitō was deployed as director of the research facility there called Unit 9420 or more popularly OKA 9420. He subsequently extended the unit to Malaysia such as in Permai Hospital in Tampoi, Johor, and a school in Kuala Pilah, Negeri Sembilan. His military career ended as Japan surrendered in 1945.

In 1950, Naitō and Kitano founded a pharmaceutical company that became Japan's first commercial blood bank, the Green Cross Corporation. Naitō research on blood chemistry led to the development of an artificial blood which was marketed as Fluosol-DA.

Naitō died in 1982 from complications due to pneumonia.
