= Universal basic income in Japan =

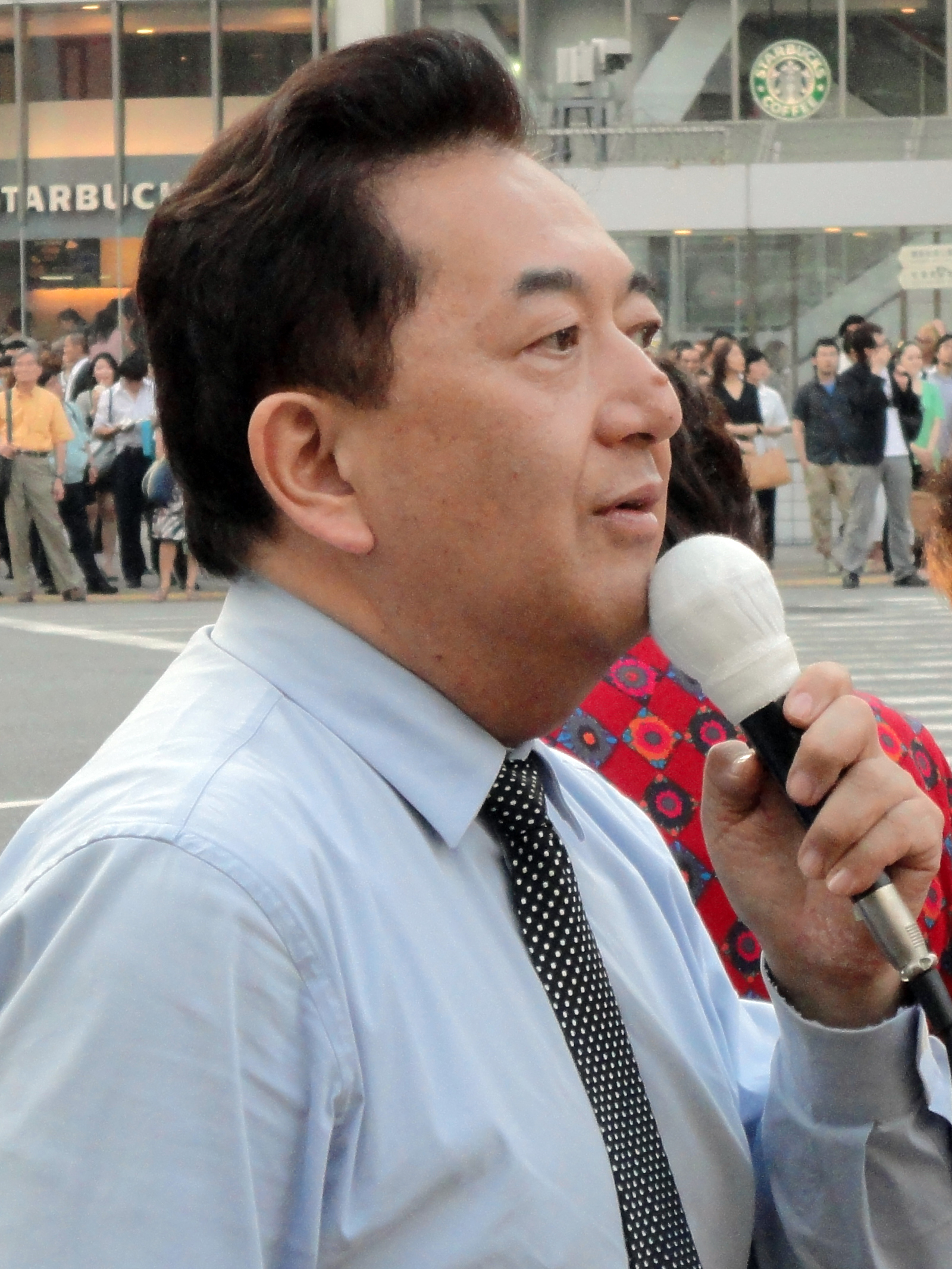
Yasuo Tanaka, in Tokyo, 2010

Universal basic income refers to a social welfare system where all citizens or residents of a country receive an unconditional lump sum income, meaning an income that is not based on need (i.e., it is not means-tested). The proposal has been debated in a number of countries in recent years, including Japan.

According to Hirano Hiroya of Mejiro University, the growing debate is understandable, as social exclusion, precarity in the labor market and poverty have increased in recent decades. Indeed, the state welfare system in Japan developed quite late and is still considerably less generous than in Europe, with the state playing a much smaller role in welfare provision and families, local communities and corporations play a larger role. In response to the combined effects of automation and job uncertainty, three political parties support universal basic income: Nippon Ishin no Kai, Reiwa Shinsengumi and Greens Japan. Japanese academics arguing for basic income include Toru Yamamori of Doshisha University and Hiroya Hirano of Nihon Fukushi University. Ronald Dore, a British sociologist specializing in the Japanese welfare state, has also been engaged in the basic income debate for many years, arguing for its implementation. The main organization promoting basic income in Japan is BIEN Japan, which is part of the Basic Income Earth Network (BIEN).

== History (year by year) ==
- 2002: The first basic income-book in Japanese, "Welfare Society and Social Security Reform: New horizon of Basic Income", is published.
- 2008: The Japanese Association for Feminist Economics have its yearly meeting, with basic income as the theme.
- 2009: The Democratic Party organize a meeting where 40 MP takes part. New Party Nippon includes basic income in their manifest.
- 2012: Greens Japan (Japanese Green party) is endorsing basic income from its start.
- 2014: Basic Income in Japan, by Yannick Vanderborght and Toru Yamamori, is the first book in English entirely devoted to the possibility for basic income in Japan.
- 2015: Tomoyuki Taira, former MP, gives a BI-lecture in Tokyo on March 10.
- 2016: A symposium on basic income and artificiell intelligens is arranged by "The Robotic Center".
- 2017: Japanese media coverage intensifies. This includes national TV showing a short program about UBI, based on a news editor's visit to Finland and includes an interview with basic income expert Toru Yamamori.
- 2019: The political party Reiwa Shinsengumi is established, which supports a basic income of ¥30,000 per person per month whenever inflation is below 2%.
- 2022: The political party, Nippon Ishin no Kai, announces its support for the introduction of a universal basic income of ¥60,000 per month, with additional supplements for non-coupled elderly
