= Mou Tun-fei =

Taiwanese filmmaker (1941–2019)

- Born: 3 May 1941; Shandong, China
- Died: 25 May 2019 (aged 78); Philadelphia, U.S.
- Other names: T. F. Mou; Mou Tun Fei; Tun Fei Mou; Chi Chiang He
- Occupation: Filmmaker
- Years active: 1966–1995
- Known for: Men Behind the Sun (1988)

Mou Tun-fei (Chinese: 牟敦芾; pinyin: Móu Dūnfèi; Wade–Giles: Mou^{2} Tun^{1}-fei^{4}) (May 3, 1941 - May 25, 2019) was a Taiwanese filmmaker known for directing the infamous 1988 horror film Men Behind the Sun.

== Biography ==
Mou was born on 3 May 1941, in Shandong, China. His family left China for Taiwan in 1949 due to the Chinese Civil War. Mou attended the National School of Arts (now National Taiwan University of Arts) that could not even afford equipment for the students. Mou thus was forced to learn filmmaking by theory alone, mainly by watching films numerous times in theaters and identifying how many cuts the films contained. After graduation, Mou was assistant director on an anti-communist propaganda film called Give Back My Country and then directed numerous Taiwanese films in a style akin to the Italian neorealist movement. His first and second feature, I Didn't Dare to Tell You (1969) and At the Runway's Edge (1970) were both banned by the Taiwanese government, especially the latter film for containing homosexual overtones.

In 1977, Mou settled in Hong Kong and joined Shaw Brothers Studio. His first film, Gun, was part of an exploitation true crime anthology The Criminals. While at Shaw Brothers, Mou would dabble in crime films (Bank Busters), romance (Melody of Love), horror (Haunted Tales) and kung-fu (A Deadly Secret). However, his most notable work for Shaw Brothers would be Lost Souls (1980), a film telling the story of a group of illegal immigrants taken captive and sexually and physically abused by a gang of human traffickers. Lost Souls has often been called a brazen, vicious and outrageous exploitation film reminiscent of Pier Paolo Pasolini’s Salò, or the 120 Days of Sodom (1975).

Mou then left Shaw Brothers to become the first director from Taiwan to work in the mainland. While working on a children’s kung fu film called Young Heroes, Mou began to hear stories about war atrocities committed by the Imperial Japanese Army during the Second Sino-Japanese War. Hearing about the biological experimentation on Chinese prisoners of war (POWs) and civilians spurred Mou to direct Men Behind the Sun (1988), a Hong Kong–mainland co-production about the war crimes committed by the military stationed at Unit 731 in Manchuria. After co-directing the hardcore pornographic film Trilogy of Lust with Julie Lee Wah-yuet, Mou directed a follow-up to Men Behind the Sun called Black Sun: The Nanking Massacre (1995), about the Nanjing Massacre.

Mou died on 25 May 2019 at his home in Philadelphia.

== Legacy ==
In January 2022, the Harvard Film Archive screened Mou's first two films as part of a retrospective examining his early career in Taiwan.

== Filmography ==
| Year | Chinese title | English title | Director | Actor | Producer | Notes |
|---|---|---|---|---|---|---|
| 1969 | 不敢跟你講 | I Didn't Dare to Tell You | Yes | | | |
| 1970 | 跑道終點 | End of the Track | Yes | | | |
| 1977 | 香港奇案之五: 奸魔 | The Criminals Part 5: The Teenager's Nightmare | Yes | | | Credited as "Chi Chiang He" |
| 1977 | 香港奇案之五: 奸魔 | Dreams of Eroticism | Yes | | | Uncredited; As part of the "Shaw's Scenario and Direction Group" |
| 1977 | 包剪搥 | Melody of Love | Yes | | | |
| 1978 | 撈過界 | Bank Busters | Yes | | | |
| 1980 | 碟仙 | Haunted Tales | Yes | | | |
| 1980 | 大大小小一家春 | One Son Too Many | Yes | | | |
| 1980 | 打蛇 | Lost Souls | Yes | Yes | | Credited as "T. F. Mous" |
| 1980 | 連城訣 | A Deadly Secret | Yes | | | |
| 1983 | 自古英雄出少年 | Little Heroes | Yes | | | |
| 1988 | 黑太陽731 | Men Behind the Sun | Yes | | | Credited as "T. F. Mou" |
| 1995 | 血戀 | Trilogy of Lust | Yes | | | Pornographic film |
| 1995 | 黑太陽─南京大屠殺 | Black Sun: The Nanking Massacre | Yes | Yes | | Credited as "T. F. Mou" |
