= Contaminated blood scandal in Japan =

Contaminated blood product scandal in Japan

In the 1980s, between one and two thousand haemophilia patients in Japan contracted HIV via contaminated blood products. Controversy centered on the continued use of non-heat-treated blood products after the development of heat treatments that prevented the spread of infection. Some high-ranking officials in the Ministry of Health and Welfare, executives of the manufacturing company and a leading doctor in the field of haemophilia study were charged for involuntary manslaughter.

== Background ==
Acquired immune deficiency syndrome, or AIDS, is a communicable disease caused by the human immunodeficiency virus, HIV. AIDS is not curable. The first recognition of the emergence of an AIDS-like disease occurred in Los Angeles in 1981.

It was not until 1985 that the first cases of AIDS were officially reported in Japan. As early as 1983, however, Japan's Ministry of Health and Welfare was notified by Baxter Travenol Laboratories (BTL) that it was manufacturing a new blood product, licensed by the U.S. Food and Drug Administration (FDA), which was heat-treated to kill HIV. BTL was interested in licensing this new product in Japan. The Green Cross Corporation, the main Japanese provider of blood products, protested that this would constitute unfair competition, as it was "not prepared to make heat-treated agents itself". The Ministry of Health responded by ordering screening of untreated blood products, clinical trials of heat-treatments, and a campaign to increase domestic blood donations. The Green Cross Corporation meanwhile distributed letters of "safety assurance of unheated blood products" to patients, many of whom had haemophilia.

== AIDS spreading in Japan ==
The first known case of infection with HIV in Japan occurred in 1979, affecting a haemophilia patient who was prescribed blood products by his doctor. A second patient was a Japanese male artist who had lived abroad for some years. Some other cases were also reported in the early 1980s and these patients were haemophilia patients or had homosexual experiences. After the intense media coverage on an HIV-positive woman who had contracted the virus through heterosexual intercourse, the disease became well known in Japan and the government ordered a study into the dispute over the safety of blood products.

== Lawsuits ==
In May and October 1989, HIV-infected haemophiliacs in Osaka and Tokyo filed lawsuits against the Ministry of Health and Welfare and five Japanese drug companies. In 1994, two charges of attempted murder were filed against Dr. Takeshi Abe, who had headed the Health Ministry's AIDS research team in 1983; he was found not guilty in 2005. Abe resigned as vice-president of Teikyo University.

In January 1996, Naoto Kan was appointed Health Minister. He assembled a team to investigate the scandal, and within a month nine files of documents related to the scandal were uncovered, despite the Ministry of Health's claims that no such documents existed. As Minister, Kan promptly admitted the Ministry's legal responsibility and formally apologised to the plaintiffs.

The reports uncovered by Kan's team revealed that, after the report about the possibility of contamination, untreated blood products were recalled by the Japanese importer. However, when the importer tried to present a report to the Ministry of Health, it was told that such a report was unnecessary. The Ministry claimed that there was a "lack of evidence pointing to links between infection with HIV and the use of unheated blood products." According to one official, "we could not make public a fact that could fan anxieties among patients" [J.E.N].

According to the files, the Ministry of Health had recommended, in 1983, that the import of untreated blood and blood products be banned, and that emergency imports of heat-treated products be allowed. A week later, however, this recommendation was withdrawn because it would "deal a blow" to Japan's marketers of untreated blood products [Updike].

In 1983, Japan imported 3.14 million litres of blood plasma from the US to produce its own blood products, as well as 46 million units of prepared blood products. These imported blood products were said to pose no risk of HIV infection, and were used in Japan until 1986. Heat-treated products had been on sale since 1985, but there was neither a recall of remaining products nor a warning about the risks of using untreated products. As a result, untreated blood preparations stored at hospitals and in patients' home refrigerators were used up; there have been cases reported in which individuals were diagnosed with haemophilia for the first time between 1985 and 1986, began treatment, and were subsequently infected with HIV, even though it was known that HIV could be transmitted in untreated blood preparations, and treated products had become available and were in use at that time.

As early as 1984, several Japanese haemophiliacs were discovered to have been infected with HIV through the use of untreated blood preparations; this fact was concealed from the public. The patients themselves continued to receive "intentional propaganda" which downplayed the risks of contracting HIV from blood products, assured their safety, and promoted their use. Of some 4500 haemophiliacs in Japan, an estimated 2000 contracted HIV in the 1980s from untreated blood preparations [J.E.N].

== Charges ==
Renzō Matsushita, former head of the Ministry of Health and Welfare's Pharmaceutical Affairs Bureau, and two of his colleagues, were found guilty of professional negligence resulting in death. Matsushita was sentenced to two years in jail. A murder charge was also brought against him. Matsushita, who after retirement became president of Green Cross, is one of at least nine former Ministry of Health bureaucrats who have retired to executive positions in Japan's blood industry since the 1980s (see ama kudari).

== See also ==
- Ryuhei Kawada
- Contaminated haemophilia blood products
