= Shirō Ishii =

Japanese biological weapons specialist (1892–1959)

Surgeon General Shirō Ishii
- 石井 四郎
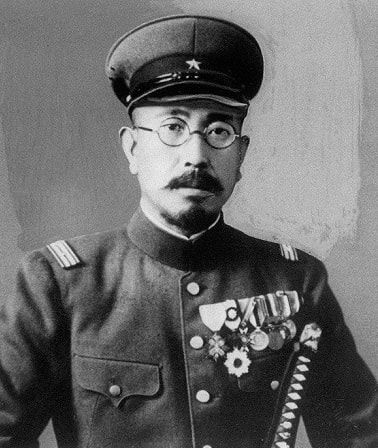
- Ishii as a surgeon lieutenant-colonel, 1935–1938
- Born: 25 June 1892; Shibayama, Chiba, Japan
- Died: 9 October 1959 (aged 67); Tokyo, Japan
- Education: Kyoto Imperial University
- Children: 1
- Military career
- Allegiance: Empire of Japan
- Branch: Imperial Japanese Army
- Service years: 1921–1945
- Rank: Surgeon general (lieutenant-general)
- Commands: Unit 731
- Conflicts: Second Sino-Japanese War; Battle of Changde; Kaimingjie attack; Battles of Khalkhin Gol; World War II
- Awards: Order of the Golden Kite, Fourth Class

Shirō Ishii (Japanese: 石井 四郎, Hepburn: Ishii Shirō; [iɕiː ɕiɾoː]; 25 June 1892 – 9 October 1959) was a Japanese biological weapons specialist, microbiologist and army medical officer who served as the director of Unit 731, the largest biological warfare and chemical warfare unit of the Imperial Japanese Army.

Ishii led the development and application of biological weapons at Unit 731 in the puppet state of Manchukuo during the Second Sino-Japanese War from 1937 to 1945. This included the Battle of Changde, the Kaimingjie germ weapon attack, and the planned Operation Cherry Blossoms at Night biological attack against the United States, which intended to spread a weaponized bubonic plague. Ishii and his colleagues also engaged in human experimentation, resulting in the deaths of thousands of subjects, most of them civilians or prisoners of war.

Ishii was later granted immunity in the International Military Tribunal for the Far East by the United States government in exchange for information and research for the U.S. biological warfare program.

== Biography ==
=== Early years ===
Shirō Ishii was born in Chiyoda Mura, now Shibayama, in Chiba Prefecture, Japan, the fourth son of Katsuya Ishii, a wealthy landowner and sake maker. The Ishii family was prominent in Chiyoda Mura; the family possessed a hereditary peerage (kazoku) and were the largest landowner in the village. Some sources describe the Ishii as having a near-feudal dominance over the local village and surrounding hamlets. Shiro Ishii's eldest brother was killed during the Russo-Japanese War, and his two surviving older brothers would both go on to work at Unit 731 under Shiro's command.

Ishii attended the Chiba Middle School (now Chiba Prefectural Chiba High School) in Chiba City and the Fourth Higher School (now Kanazawa University), a higher school in Kanazawa, Ishikawa Prefecture. Some of his classmates regarded him as brash, abrasive and arrogant. His daughter Harumi felt that Shiro had been "unjustly condemned", saying "my father was a very warm-hearted person ... he was so bright that people sometimes could not catch up with the speed of his thinking and that made him irritated, and he shouted at them." In 1916, Ishii enrolled at Faculty of Medicine, Kyoto Imperial University. He graduated in 1920, and married the daughter of Akari Torasaburō, the university's president, in the same year. While in Kyoto, Ishii developed an interest in bacteriology. He published three papers in 1920 about Streptococcus pneumoniae, which was also the focus of his doctoral dissertation.

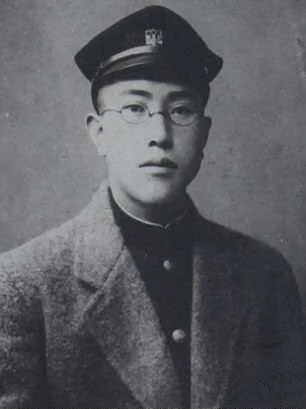
Graduation photo of Shiro Ishii from the Department of Medicine of Kyoto Imperial University in 1920

In 1921, Ishii was commissioned into the Imperial Japanese Army as a military surgeon with the rank of Army Surgeon, First Class (surgeon lieutenant). In 1922, Ishii was assigned to the 1st Army Hospital and Army Medical School in Tokyo, where his work impressed his superiors enough to enable him to return to Kyoto Imperial University to pursue post-graduate medical schooling in 1924. During his studies, Ishii would often grow bacteria "pets" in multiple petri dishes, and his odd practice of raising bacteria as companions rather than as research subjects made him notable to the staff of the university. He did not get along well with his classmates; they would become infuriated as a result of his "pushy behaviour" and "indifference". One of his mentors, Professor Ren Kimura, recalled that Ishii had an odd habit of doing his laboratory work in the middle of the night, using laboratory equipment that had been carefully cleaned by his classmates earlier. His classmates would "really be mad when they came in and found the laboratory equipment dirty the next morning". In 1925, Ishii was promoted to Army Surgeon, Second Class (surgeon captain).

=== Biological warfare project ===
By 1927, Ishii was advocating for the creation of a Japanese biological warfare program, and in 1928 began a two-year tour of the West, where he did extensive research on the development and effects of biological weapons and chemical warfare from World War I onwards. The extent of Ishii's travels in the West are disputed, and Ishii likely exaggerated the scale of his travels to mislead investigators; he claimed to American interrogators to have travelled to the United States and Canada, while later investigations determined that he had not visited either country.

Ishii's travels were highly successful and helped win him the patronage of Sadao Araki, the Japanese Minister of the Army. Ishii also received the backing of Araki's ideological rival in the army, Major-General Tetsuzan Nagata, who was later considered Ishii's "most active supporter" at the Khabarovsk War Crime Trials. In January 1931, Ishii received promotion to Senior Army Surgeon, Third Class (surgeon major). According to Ishii's followers, Ishii was extremely loyal to the Emperor Hirohito, and had an "enthusiastic personality" and "daring and carefree attitude", with eccentric work habits, such as working late at night in the lab after hanging out with friends at town. He was also known for his heavy drinking, womanizing and embezzling habits, which were tolerated by his colleagues. Ishii was described as a vehement nationalist, and this helped him gain access to the people who could provide him funds.

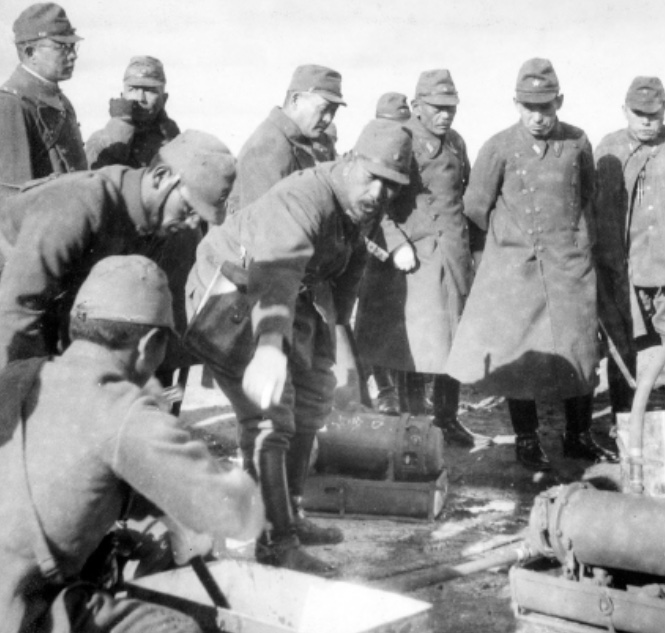
Ishii in 1939 inspecting water filters at the Battle of Khalkhin Gol

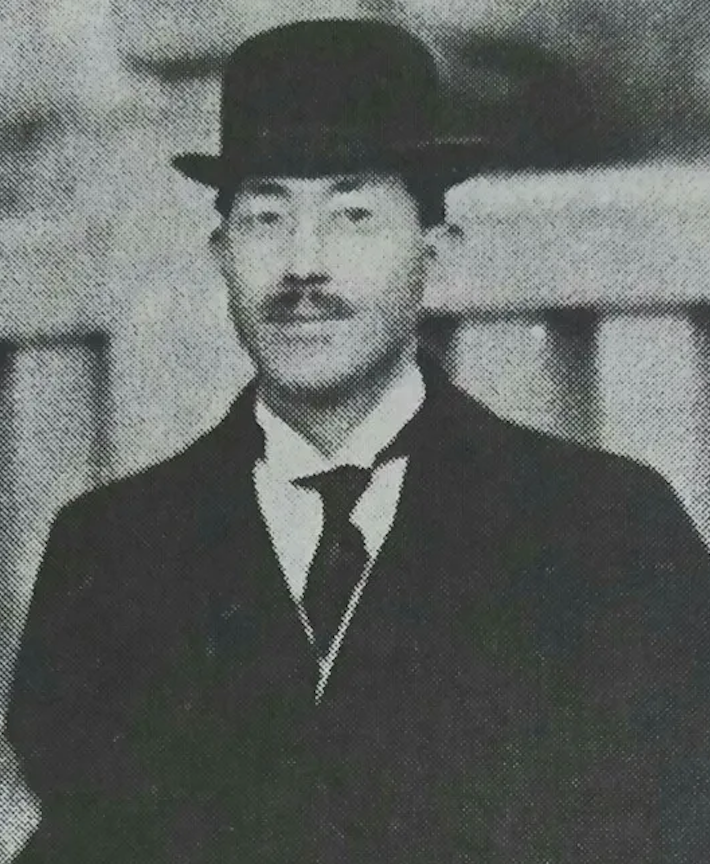
Shiro Ishii in 1940

In 1935, Ishii was promoted to Senior Army Surgeon, Second Class (surgeon lieutenant-colonel). On 1 August 1936, Ishii would be given formal control over Unit 731 and its research facilities. A former member of Unit 731 recalled in 1998 that when he first met Ishii in Tokyo, he was surprised at his commander's appearance: "Ishii was slovenly dressed. His uniform was covered with food stains and ashes from numerous cigarettes. His officer's sword was poorly fastened and dragged on the floor". However, in Manchuria, Ishii would transform into a different character: "he was dressed immaculately. His uniform was spotless, and his sword was tied correctly".

As the leader of Unit 731, Ishii conducted a variety of experiments, including vivisections, testing biological weapons on Chinese villages, poisoning by toxins and gases and forcing inmates to inflict syphilis on each other. Ishii also reportedly showed Hideki Tojo, who would later become Prime Minister in 1941, films of the experiments over several years. Tojo considered them "unpleasant" and eventually stopped watching them.

Further promotions for Ishii would follow: he was promoted to Senior Army Surgeon, First Class (surgeon colonel) on 1 March 1938, Assistant Surgeon General (surgeon Major General) on 1 March 1941, and Surgeon General (surgeon Lieutenant General) on 1 March 1945. Emperor Hirohito rewarded him with a special service medal.

In 1945, Ishii developed a plan to spread plague fleas along the populated west coast of the US, known as Operation Cherry Blossoms at Night. Planning for Operation PX was finalized on March 26, 1945, but shelved shortly thereafter due to the strong opposition of Chief of General Staff Yoshijirō Umezu. Umezu later explained his decision as such: "If bacteriological warfare is conducted, it will grow from the dimension of war between Japan and America to an endless battle of humanity against bacteria. Japan will earn the derision of the world." Ishii and the Japanese government attempted to cover up the facilities and experiments, but ultimately failed with their secret university lab in Tokyo and their main lab in Harbin, China. Ishii fled Harbin for Japan by plane on 12 August after ordering the destruction of Unit 731's facilities.

The Exhibition Hall of Evidences of Crime Committed by Unit 731 of the Japanese Imperial Army (731罪证陈列馆) in Harbin stands as a museum to the unit and the atrocities they committed. Estimates for the number of people killed by Japanese biological warfare range as high as 300,000.

Ishii was later granted immunity in the International Military Tribunal for the Far East by the United States government in exchange for information and research for the U.S. biological warfare program.

=== War crimes immunity ===
Following the end of the war, Ishii went into hiding in the Kanazawa area. Realizing that the end of war put them at risk of being prosecuted for war crimes, Unit 731 personnel coordinated the destruction of documentation and agreed on cover stories to limit information if any of them were interrogated. In November 1945, the American occupational authorities began a search for Ishii, whom they considered a high priority. In possession of around $1 million in cash, Ishii arranged a fake funeral for himself in his native Chiyoda. However, the Americans were tipped off to Ishii's deception and continued the search.

Ishii was arrested by United States authorities during the Occupation of Japan at the end of World War II and, along with other leaders, was supposed to be thoroughly interrogated by Soviet authorities. Instead, Ishii and his team managed to negotiate and receive immunity in 1946 from Japanese war crimes prosecution before the Tokyo tribunal in exchange for their full disclosure. Although the Soviet authorities wished the prosecutions to take place, the United States objected after the reports of a team of military microbiologists headed by Lieutenant Colonel Murray Sanders stated that the information was "absolutely invaluable”; it "could never have been obtained in the United States because of scruples attached to experiments on humans" and "the information was obtained fairly cheaply." On 6 May 1947, Douglas MacArthur wrote to Washington that "additional data, possibly some statements from Ishii probably can be obtained by informing Japanese involved that information will be retained in intelligence channels and will not be employed as 'War Crimes' evidence." Ishii's immunity deal was concluded in 1948 and he was never prosecuted for any war crimes or crimes against humanity.

=== Post-war activities ===
After being granted immunity, Ishii was hired by the U.S. government to lecture American officers at Fort Detrick on the uses of bioweapons and the findings made by Unit 731. During the Korean War, Ishii reportedly traveled to Korea to take part in the U.S. Army's alleged biological warfare activities. On 22 February 1952, Ishii was explicitly named in a statement made by North Korean Foreign Minister Pak Hon-yong, claiming that he, along with other "Japanese bacteriological war criminals", had been involved in "systematically spreading large quantities of bacteria-carrying insects by aircraft in order to disseminate contagious diseases over our frontline positions and our rear". However, whether the U.S. Army actually used biological weapons against Chinese or North Korean forces, or whether such allegations were mere propaganda, is disputed by historians.

After returning to Japan, Ishii opened a clinic, performing examinations and treatments for free. He kept a diary, but it did not make reference to any of his wartime activities with Unit 731.

=== Death ===
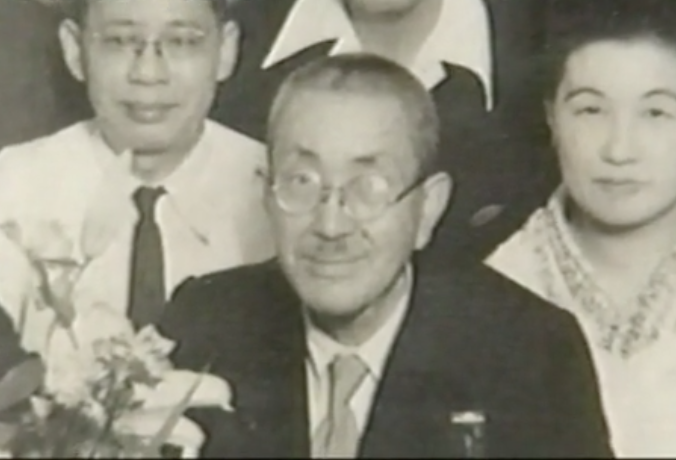
Shiro Ishii at a reunion party of Unit 731 members after the war

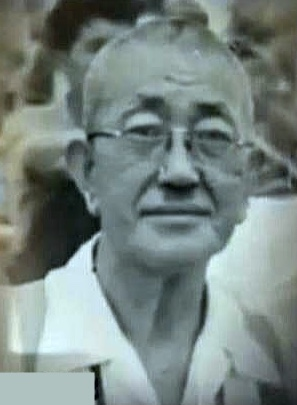
Shiro Ishii after the war

Ishii died on 9 October 1959, from laryngeal cancer at the age of 67 at a hospital in Shinjuku, Tokyo. Ishii's funeral was chaired by Masaji Kitano, his second-in-command at Unit 731.

According to his daughter, Ishii became a Roman Catholic shortly before his death.

Ishii's daughter, Harumi Ishii, recalled in an interview that shortly before his death, Ishii's medical condition worsened:

One day he took some sample tissue from himself to the University of Tokyo's Faculty of Medicine and asked one of his former subordinates to examine it, without telling him to whom it belonged. When he was told that the tissue was riddled by cancer, he proudly shouted that he had thought so too. No doctor had dared tell him he was suffering from cancer of the throat. He eventually underwent surgery and lost his voice. He was an earnest student of medicine to his last day, taking notes on his physical condition. He told his old professor Ren Kimura who came to visit him at that time: "it's all over now", writing the message because he could no longer speak. Shortly before his death, he asked to be baptised by the late Dr Herman Heuvers, former President of Sophia University in Tokyo. Dr Heuvers and my father were acquainted with each other since before the war. My father had much respect for the German people and their culture. He was baptised into the Roman Catholic Church and took the name Joseph. It seems to me that my father felt relieved somehow.

— Williams and Wallace, "Unit 731: The Japanese Army's Secret Of Secrets" (1989 p.298)

== In media ==
Ishii was portrayed by Min Ji-hwan in the MBC TV series Eyes of Dawn, and portrayed by Gang Wang in the 1988 film Men Behind The Sun.

In the grimdark fantasy novel, The Poppy War, which mirrors the Second Sino-Japanese War, a fictional counterpart of Ishii, named Shiro, performs human experiments in a concentration camp similar to Unit 731.

== See also ==
- Josef Mengele
- Operation Paperclip
- Khabarovsk War Crime Trials
- Nobusuke Kishi

== Sources ==
=== References ===
- Barenblatt, Daniel. A Plague Upon Humanity: the Secret Genocide of Axis Japan's Germ Warfare Operation, HarperCollins, 2004. ISBN 978-0060186258
- Gold, Hal. Unit 731 Testimony, Charles E Tuttle Co., 1996. ISBN 978-4900737396
- Williams, Peter and Wallace, David. Unit 731: Japan's Secret Biological Warfare in World War II, Free Press, 1989. ISBN 978-0029353011
- Harris, Sheldon H. Factories of Death: Japanese Biological Warfare 1932–45 and the American Cover-Up, Routledge, 1994. ISBN 978-0415091053, 978-0415932141
- Endicott, Stephen and Hagerman, Edward. The United States and Biological Warfare: Secrets from the Early Cold War and Korea, Indiana University Press, 1999. ISBN 978-0253334725
- Handelman, Stephen and Alibek, Ken. Biohazard: The Chilling True Story of the Largest Covert Biological Weapons Program in the World – Told from Inside by the Man Who Ran It, Random House, 1999. ISBN 978-0375502316, 978-0385334969
- Harris, Robert and Paxman, Jeremy. A Higher Form of Killing: The Secret History of Chemical and Biological Warfare, Random House, 2002. ISBN 978-0812966534
- Barnaby, Wendy. The Plague Makers: The Secret World of Biological Warfare, Frog Ltd, 1999. ISBN 978-1883319854, 978-0756756987, 978-0826412584, 978-0826414151
- Yang Yan-Jun and Tam Yue-Him. Unit 731: Laboratory of the Devil, Auschwitz of the East: Japanese Biological Warfare in China 1933-45. Fonthill Media, 2018 (reprinted 2021). ISBN 978-1781556788
