= Edward Hagerman =

Edward Hagerman was a Canadian author and professor at York University. He was born May 18, 1939, in Zealand Station, New Brunswick, to Howard and Mary Hagerman. He wrote many works on military strategy, most notable being The American Civil War and the Origins of Modern Warfare: Ideas, Organization, and Field Command. He died in the earliest hours of June 14, 2016, at Toronto General Hospital.
