= Green Cross (Japanese company) =

Japanese pharmaceutical company

Green Cross Corporation (株式会社ミドリ十字; Kabushiki Gaisha Midori Jūji) was one of the premier pharmaceutical companies in Japan. The company merged into Yoshitomi Pharmaceutical Industries, Ltd. (吉富製薬株式会社) on April 1, 1998, and renamed to Welfide Corporation (ウェルファイド株式会社) on April 1, 2000. And finally Welfide Corporation and Mitsubishi-Tokyo Pharmaceutical Inc. (三菱東京製薬株式会社) were merged to form Mitsubishi Pharma Corporation (三菱ウェルファーマ株式会社) on October 1, 2001.

Green Cross was founded in 1950 as Japan's first commercial blood bank and became a diversified international pharmaceutical company producing ethical drugs for delivery or administration by doctors and healthcare workers. Its founders were war criminals such as Ryōichi Naitō and Masaji Kitano who performed torture and experiments on humans in the Japanese military's notorious Unit 731 during World War II. Also serving as a consultant for the company was Murray Sanders, the American officer and physician who had petitioned for Kitano's acquittal after the war.

Its products were extensively used in the treatments of a wide range of ailments. As well as supplying whole blood for transfusions, Green Cross was also active in developing blood derivative products such as coagulation factors, immunoglobulin and albumin. In the mid-1960s, it expanded into the non-plasma sector. Cardiovascular agents, coagulation/fibrinolytic agents, immunological agents, anti-inflammatory agents, albumin-based agents, blood plasma components and parenteral nutrition accounted for 71% of fiscal 1998 unconsolidated revenues; wholesale of diagnostic reagents, 14% and other, 15%. Unconsolidated revenues accounted for 59.5% of fiscal 1998 consolidated revenues. The company had eleven consolidated subsidiaries, three each in the United States and Japan, and one each in Germany, the United Kingdom, Barbados, China and Hong Kong. Overseas sales accounted for 41.9% of fiscal 1998 consolidated revenues.

In the late 1980s, Green Cross and Takeshi Abe were at the center of a scandal in which up to 3,000 Japanese people contracted HIV through the distribution and use of blood products which were known to be unsafe.

== See also ==
- HIV-tainted blood scandal (Japan)
