= Factories of Death =

1994 book on Japan's biological warfare program and US entanglement

- Author: Sheldon H. Harris
- Language: English
- Publisher: Routledge
- Publication date: 1994
- Publication place: United States
- ISBN: 9780429231698

Factories of Death: Japanese Biological Warfare, 1932–1945, and the American Cover-up is a World War II history book published by Sheldon H. Harris in 1994.

It reconstructs Japan's wartime biological-warfare program – most notably that of Unit 731 — and argues that, even as Japanese scientists conducted human experiments and deployed biological agents in China, the US authorities shielded the perpetrators from prosecution in exchange for military secrets and data from the program.

The book is split into two parts: the first providing forensic accounting of the Japanese experiments; and the second documenting the post-war handling by American military and intelligence agencies.

== Reception ==
A review in The Hastings Center Report noted that Harris's work presents “a picture of Japanese and American governments at their worst.”

It highlighted how the work is “particularly damning” in the way it depicts the amorality of Japanese army physicians, while Harris also "shows how the U.S. Army used the Japanese war criminals’ meticulously kept records to advance its own biological warfare and chemical warfare studies”. It caveated that the book's one minor flaw was its outraged, at times shrill tone.

The review further noted that the US Army "classified the records and delayed Harris’s Freedom of Information Act requests" as a means of obstructing research on the topic.

A more critical review in The Journal of Asian Studies, noted: "One day there will be an important book about Japan's wartime chemical and bacteriological warfare on enemy troops and population and about its medical experiments on live subjects. This is not it." It added that the best work in the field had been done by journalists Peter Williams and David Wallace.
