= Rainbow and Greens =

- Founded: 1998
- Dissolved: 2008
- Ideology: Green politics

Rainbow and Greens (虹と緑, Niji to Midori) was a Green political organization in Japan from 1998–2008. It was a nationwide network of prefectural assembly members, usually running on local platforms variously named as "living citizen network", "living club", "living cooperative" or the Rainbow and Greens 500-Member List Movement . It is a member of the Asia-Pacific Green Network. The national spokespersons for the party were Kiyoshi Matsuya , former Shizuoka Prefecture assembly member and the city councillor Mutsuko Katsura in Ibaraki, Osaka.

The symbol of the "rainbow" represents diversity, solidarity and the cooperation which respect personal differences; the colour "green" signifies conversion to an economy which coexists with natural environment.

== Electoral record ==
In the 2004 parliamentary election, this network of local groups supported the Democratic Party of Japan and the conservative-leaning national Green party Environmental Green Political Assembly (Midori no Kaigi).

In the 2007 election, the party supported Ryuhei Kawada, who was elected to the House of Councillors. Kawada announced that he will organize a Green party group in the House, helping the Rainbow and Greens to become a national political party. Reportedly, the Rainbow and Greens have decided to dissolve itself in December 2007 and merge with the Japan Greens. The merger took place in 2008, leading to the larger Green Future network which was formally established into the Green Party in July of 2012.
