= SARS conspiracy theory =

2003 conspiracy theory regarding the SARS virus

The SARS conspiracy theory began to emerge during the severe acute respiratory syndrome (SARS) outbreak in China in the spring of 2003, when Sergei Kolesnikov, a Russian scientist and a member of the Russian Academy of Medical Sciences, first publicized his claim that the SARS coronavirus is a synthesis of measles and mumps. According to Kolesnikov, this combination cannot be formed in the natural world and thus the SARS virus must have been produced under laboratory conditions. Another Russian scientist, Nikolai Filatov, head of Moscow's epidemiological services, had earlier commented that the SARS virus was probably man-made.

Circumstantial evidence suggests that the SARS virus crossed over to humans from Asian palm civets ("civet cats"), a type of animal that is often killed and eaten in Guangdong, where SARS was first discovered.

Tong Zeng, an activist with no medical background, authored the book The Last Defense Line: Concerns About the Loss of Chinese Genes, published in 2003. In the book, Zeng suggested researchers from the United States may have created SARS as an anti-Chinese bioweapon after taking blood samples in China for a longevity study in the 1990s. The book's hypothesis was a front-page report in the Guangzhou newspaper Southern Metropolis Daily.

== See also ==
- COVID-19 lab leak theory
- Misinformation related to the COVID-19 pandemic
