= Operation PX =

Planned WWII operation against the US

- Operation Cherry Blossoms at Night
- Operational scope: West Coast of the United States
- Planned: December 1944
- Planned by: Jisaburō Ozawa aided by Shirō Ishii
- Objective: Spreading weaponized bubonic plague and other pathogens on US West Coast
- Outcome: Cancelled in March 1945

Operation PX (Japanese: PX作戦, romanized: PX Sakusen), also known as Operation Cherry Blossoms at Night (夜桜作戦 Yozakura Sakusen) was a planned Japanese military attack on civilians in the United States using biological weapons, devised during World War II. The proposal was for Imperial Japanese Navy submarines to launch seaplanes that would deliver weaponized bubonic plague, developed by Unit 731 of the Imperial Japanese Army, to the West Coast of the United States. The operation was abandoned shortly after its planning was finalized in March 1945 due to the strong opposition of General Yoshijirō Umezu, Chief of the Army General Staff.

== Overview ==
Operation PX was proposed in December 1944 by the Japanese Naval General Staff, led by Vice-Admiral Jisaburō Ozawa. The name for the operation came from the Japanese use of the code name PX for Pestis bacillus-infected fleas. In planning the operation, the navy partnered with Lieutenant-General Shirō Ishii of Unit 731, who had extensive experience on weaponizing pathogenic bacteria and human vulnerability to biological and chemical warfare.

The plan for the attack involved Seiran aircraft launched by submarine aircraft carriers upon the West Coast of the United States—specifically, the cities of San Diego, Los Angeles, and San Francisco. The planes would spread weaponized bubonic plague, cholera, typhus, dengue fever, and other pathogens in a biological terror attack upon the population. The submarine crews would infect themselves and run ashore in a suicide mission.

Planning for Operation PX was finalized on March 26, 1945, but shelved shortly thereafter due to the strong opposition of Chief of General Staff Yoshijirō Umezu. Umezu later explained his decision as such: "If bacteriological warfare is conducted, it will grow from the dimension of war between Japan and America to an endless battle of humanity against bacteria. Japan will earn the derision of the world."

A final planned use of the biological weapons came just after the surrender of Japan, as Ishii planned to stage suicide germ attacks against U.S. occupation troops in Japan. This planned attack never took place either, due to opposition from Yoshijirō Umezu and Torashirō Kawabe, who did not want Ishii to die in a suicide attack, and asked him to instead "wait for [the] next opportunity calmly".

The first discussion of Operation PX after the war was by Eno Yoshio, a former captain in the Imperial Japanese Navy, who gave an interview with Sankei in August 1977. In the article, Yoshio is described being involved in the planning, and was quoted as saying: "This is the first time I have said anything about Operation PX, because it involved the rules of war and international law. The plan was not put into actual operation, but I felt that just the fact that it was formulated would cause international misunderstanding. I never even leaked anything to the staff of the war history archives at the Japanese Defense Agency, and I don't feel comfortable talking about it even now. But, at the time, Japan was losing badly, and any means to win would have been all right."
