= Sheldon H. Harris =

American historian & academic (1928–2002)

- Born: August 22, 1928
- Died: August 31, 2002 (aged 74)
- Citizenship: United States of America
- Education: Brooklyn College, Harvard University, Columbia University
- Occupations: professor emeritus of History at California State University, Northridge
- Works: Factories of Death: Japanese Biological Warfare, 1932–1945, and the American Cover-up

Sheldon Howard Harris (August 22, 1928 – August 31, 2002) was a historian and professor emeritus of History at California State University, Northridge.

== Biography ==
Harris was born in Brooklyn. A professor of history at California State University, Northridge, in 1984 he became involved in research on Japanese biological warfare experimentation in Manchuria. His research led him to deliver several papers to international conferences on science and ethics and to the publication of a number of scholarly articles that aroused considerable interest in the United States, Europe, Japan and China. He published six books and dozens of articles. In 1994, he published Factories of Death: Japanese Biological Warfare, 1932–1945, and the American Cover-up.

He was educated at Brooklyn College, Harvard University, and Columbia University.

== See also ==
- Biological warfare
