= Masaji Kitano =

Second commander of Unit 731

- 北野 政次
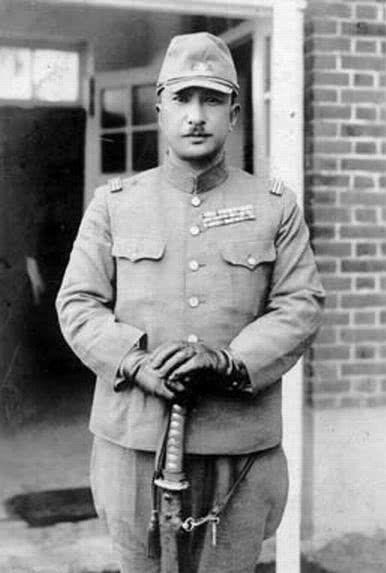
- Born: July 14, 1894; Hyōgo Prefecture, Japan
- Died: May 17, 1986 (aged 91); Tokyo, Japan
- Education: Tokyo Imperial University
- Military career
- Allegiance: Empire of Japan
- Branch: Imperial Japanese Army
- Service years: 1921–1945
- Rank: Lieutenant general
- Commands: Unit 731, 13th Army Medical Corps
- Conflicts: Second Sino-Japanese War; World War II

Masaji Kitano (北野 政次, Kitano Masaji; July 14, 1894 – May 17, 1986) was a Japanese doctor, medical physician, microbiologist and a lieutenant general in the Imperial Japanese Army.

He was the second commander of Unit 731, a covert biological and chemical warfare research and development unit responsible for some of the most notorious war crimes carried out by Japanese personnel.

== Biography ==
Masaji Kitano was born on 14 July 1894 in Hyōgo Prefecture, Japan.

He graduated in medicine from the School of Medicine, Tokyo Imperial University on 26 November 1920 and the following year was commissioned as a lieutenant as an army surgeon. In 1923 at Tokyo Imperial University's graduate school, he commenced studies in infectious diseases, intestinal perforation and shigella, and became first class army surgeon seven months later. He received his doctoral degree in 1925 with a dissertation titled "Experimental research on seronegative intestine perforation and parathyroid fever", four years before being promoted to third-class army surgeon.

In 1932, he worked in the First Army Hospital and taught at the Medical Department of the Ministry of War of Japan. The following year he visited the United States and Europe for research, and in August 1935 held the position of chief second-class army surgeon (Nitō guni sei). In 1936, he was dispatched to Manchukuo and became a professor at the Manchu School of Medicine, teaching microbiology.

In 1942, he was appointed the second commander of Unit 731. His predecessor was Shirō Ishii. In April 1945, he was promoted to lieutenant surgeon general and appointed commander of the 13th Army Medical Corps. After the Japanese surrender in August 1945, he was detained in a POW camp in Shanghai. Like all involved with Unit 731 or Japanese biological warfare, he was repatriated to Japan in January 1946.

Kitano was one of the founders of the Japanese pharmaceutical company and first commercial blood bank Green Cross, which was renamed Welfide in 1998 and which became part of Mitsubishi Pharma in 2001. In 1959, he became head of the plant in Tokyo and chief director of the company. He was the chief funeral commissioner of Shiro Ishii. Kitano died in Tokyo in 1986 at the age of 91.

== Research ==
He was considered as the most important figure in Japan's biological warfare research. At the time of his professorship in microbiology at Mukden Medical College, he created a biological warfare laboratory there.

In conducting his studies, Kitano extensively used human subjects for his experiments. A number of his publications in Japanese scientific journals for twenty years were based from these experiments. Readers of his works as well as students at Mukden Military Medical College became aware of his use of code names. Whenever he used the term "monkeys" instead of a specific species of primates, he was referring to humans from other nationalities.

During his time as a microbiologist, he was stationed in different biological warfare facilities under Japanese territory. The last recorded facility where he stationed was in Shanghai.
