= Ningbo plague attack =

Event in Second Sino-Japanese War

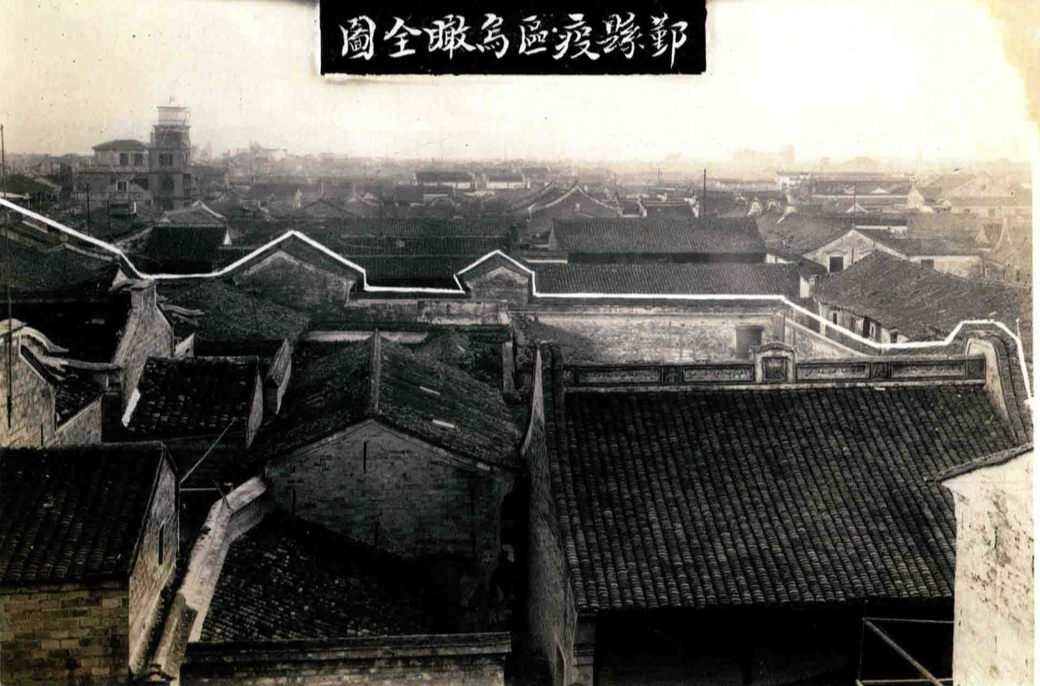
- The white line indicates the plague epidemic area within Ningbo
- Location: Ningbo city in the Republic of China
- Date: 27 October 1940
- Attack type: Biological warfare
- Deaths: 1,554
- Perpetrators: Imperial Japanese Army: Imperial Japanese Army Air Service; Unit 731; Unit Ei 1644

Ningbo plague attack
- Traditional Chinese: 開明街鼠疫災難
- Simplified Chinese: 开明街鼠疫灾难
- Literal meaning: Kaiming Street plague disaster
Transcriptions
Standard Mandarin
- Hanyu Pinyin: Kāimíng jiē shǔyì zāinàn

The Ningbo plague attack (simplified Chinese: 开明街鼠疫灾难; traditional Chinese: 開明街鼠疫災難; lit. 'Kaiming Street plague disaster') was a secret biological warfare attack launched by Japan in October 1940 against the Kaiming Street area of Ningbo, Zhejiang, China, using fleas infested with plague (Yersinia pestis). A joint operation of the Imperial Japanese Army's Unit 731 and Unit Ei 1644, the attack was carried out by military planes taking off from Jianqiao Airport in Hangzhou, which airdropped wheat, corn, cotton scraps, and sand infected with plague fleas to target locations. From September 1940, Ningbo, Quzhou, and other places were subjected to various forms of biological warfare until the end of October 1940, when the attacks triggered a plague epidemic in Ningbo.

After the outbreak of the plague, the city authorities in Ningbo built an isolation wall 4.3-metre (14 ft) high around the epidemic area, segregating patients and suspected cases, and eventually burned down the Kaiming Street area to eradicate the disease. Until the 1960s, this burned area was still referred to as the "plague field". According to the doctoral thesis of Junichi Kaneko, a military doctor of Unit 731, on October 27, 1940, Unit 731 spread 2 kilograms (4.4 pounds) of plague bacteria over Ningbo using aircraft, resulting in a total of 1,554 deaths from the first- and second-round infections.

== Background ==
=== Japanese biological warfare plan ===
In June 1925, Japan signed the Geneva Protocol, which committed Japan to refrain from using biological and chemical weapons in warfare. The development of Japan's biological weapons was thus highly secretive and led by Shiro Ishii. He planned and raised funds for Japan's biological weapons program. In 1939, the Imperial Japanese Army established Unit Ei 1644 in Nanjing to conduct research on biological and chemical weapons. Units Ei 1644 and 731 studied the effects of various chemicals and pathogens that could be used as biological weapons on soldiers and civilians and developed weapons to further expand the Japanese Empire's territory in Asia.

After the failure of the rapid decisive victory plan in the war against China, the Japanese military began using bacteriological weapons. In the summer of 1939, during the Battle of Khalkhin Gol, the Imperial Japanese Army used biological and chemical weapons against Soviet and Mongolian troops. On June 13, large quantities of white powder were airdropped in the vicinity of Lihai, Shaoxing. On June 15, chemical tests conducted by the local river police did not reveal any abnormalities, but subsequent bacterial culture tests revealed turbidity in one test tube and cotton-like floating substances in another, with pathogens such as tetanus and diphtheria observed under a microscope. Within days after the airdrop, the weather in Shaoxing was clear and sunny, with abundant sunlight, which was not conducive to bacterial growth, so no epidemic outbreak occurred. This is the earliest recorded instance of the Japanese military's bacteriological weapon attack in Zhejiang.

=== Strategic location of Ningbo ===
Before 1937, Zhejiang cities such as Ningbo, Jinhua, and Quzhou in Zhejiang did not experience a plague epidemic. However, people may have been aware of the plague near Ningbo in Shanghai in 1910. The incubation period of the plague is two to eight days. At the time of the outbreak, sulfa drugs, streptomycin, and other antibiotics had not yet been invented, so residents of Ningbo could not have access to antibiotics and were primarily treated with serum. Without treatment, the mortality rate of the plague was almost 100%, and there was not enough serum supply prepared in advance.

After the outbreak of the Second Sino-Japanese War in 1937, Ningbo became one of the important seaports for China to obtain international aid supplies, with a daily throughput of over 10,000 tons of goods. As a port city with a population of 260,000, Ningbo had numerous streets, dense housing, crowded residents, relatively poor sanitary conditions, high population mobility, and frequent goods entering and leaving, making it easy for the plague to spread and proliferate through people and goods transmission. Kaiming Street is a north-south urban main road in Ningbo and is the main commercial centre of the old city.

Since the first Japanese air raid on Lishe Airport on August 16, 1937, the Japanese military had directly attacked Ningbo at least seven times. On 17 July 1940, the Japanese military first invaded Zhenhai, but were driven out by the Chinese army five days later on the 22nd. The Japanese military again bombed Ningbo on 5 and 10 September of the same year.

== Operation ==
=== Decision-making ===
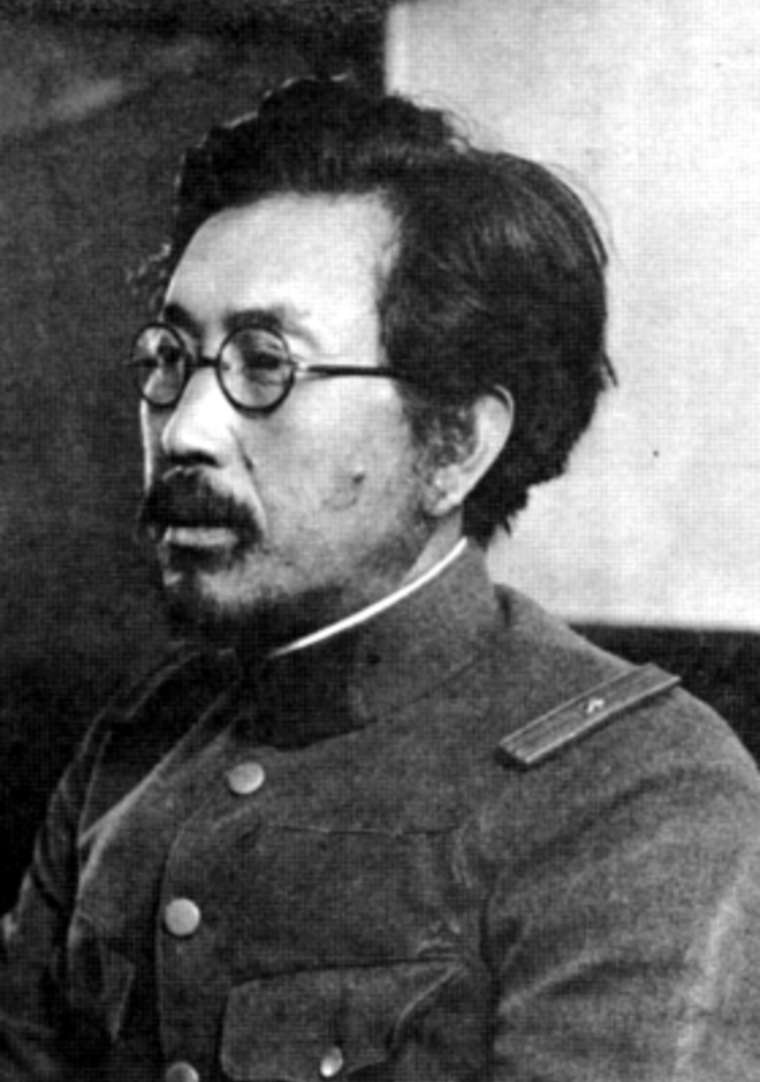
Shirō Ishii

In June 1940, the Imperial Japanese Army headquarters formally discussed the use of biological weapons and issued orders to begin biological warfare. On 5 June 1940, discussions on the implementation of bacteriological warfare were held by Colonel Kozo Aramaki from the Operations Department of the Imperial Japanese Army General Staff, Major Kumaomi Imoto from the China Expeditionary Army Staff, and Lieutenant Colonel Tomosada Masuda, acting commander of Unit Ei 1644 in Nanjing. It was decided during the discussions that the main cities in Zhejiang would be targeted, and the method of operation would involve dispersing bacterial liquids from aircraft and air-dropping fleas infected with plague. On August 6, a heavily guarded train departed from the barracks of Unit 731 in Pingfang, bound for Hangzhou. The train was loaded with 700 aerial bombs, 20 vehicles, 70 kilograms of Salmonella typhi, 50 kilograms of Vibrio cholerae, and 5 kilograms of plague fleas. Shiro Ishii was the overall director of this operation.

On September 10, 1940, discussions were held in Hangzhou between the Central China Expeditionary Army and the Nara Unit, responsible for bacteriological warfare and composed of personnel from Unit 731 and Unit Ei 1644, to select the targets for the attacks: Ningbo and Quzhou, with Jinhua as a backup, to coincide with the blockade of the Ningbo Port by the Imperial Japanese Navy which commenced in July 1940. The Japanese army also referred to this operation as "Operation Hangzhou". According to the plan, aircraft would take off from Hangzhou Jianqiao Airport and drop ceramic bacteriological bombs developed by Shirō Ishii himself, along with cotton, shredded cloth, and other materials to protect the fleas. Corn and cloth were infested with fleas carrying pathogens of cholera and plague to infect rats, which would then transmit the diseases to human hosts.

=== Air raids ===
During the three-month-long bacteriological warfare, six areas including Ningbo were subjected to various forms of bacteriological attacks. In Quzhou, the Japanese employed aircraft to scatter grain and wheat seeds carrying bacteria; in Ningbo, aircraft were used to spread bacteria-laden grains and cotton within or around the city; in Jinhua, explosions from bombs dropped by aircraft produced a pale yellow smoke; in Yushan, a plan was implemented to release bacteria among ordinary residents, with pathogens being introduced into pools and wells, and even by placing hundreds of seemingly abandoned desserts and fruits injected with large quantities of typhoid and paratyphoid bacteria by the Imperial Japanese Army at doorsteps and beside trees, deceiving local residents who lacked food to consume.

On 4 October 1940, wheat and barley items dropped by Japanese aircraft were found in Quzhou. That afternoon, the county magistrate ordered the residents of Quzhou to gather and burn the air-dropped items. Starting from 10 October, the area began to see deaths from the diseases. From 18 September to 8 October, the Japanese launched a total of six attacks on Ningbo, none of which resulted in a plague outbreak. Despite fleas being dropped in Quzhou on 4 October, there were no apparent effects by the end of October.On 22 October, Japanese military aircraft flew over Ningbo and dropped wheat and other items. The airstrikes in Quzhou did not attract the attention of the provincial government, which instead focused on a plague outbreak in Qiyuan, not associated with the Imperial Japanese Army.

At around 7 a.m. on 27 October, air raid sirens sounded in downtown Ningbo, and Japanese military aircraft flew over the streets of the city, dropping leaflets instead of bombs. According to eyewitness Hu Xianzhong, the leaflets depicted flags of Japan, Germany, and Italy, and a cartoon depicting "Sino-Japanese friendship", claiming that Chongqing was suffering from famine and hardship while the Japanese people were well-fed and had surplus food to help them. Around 2 p.m., Japanese aircraft reappeared and air-dropped barley, millet, flour, and clusters of cotton balls. Archibald Crouch, an American missionary in Ningbo, noted in his diary that while Japanese aircraft usually flew in groups when arriving in Ningbo, this time there was only one aircraft, which was unusual, and observed that after the aircraft passed, it seemed to release a cloud that dispersed downward. Local residents had no experience with plague outbreak, and no one mentioned that this was a biological weapons attack that day.

== Epidemic ==
=== Early spread ===
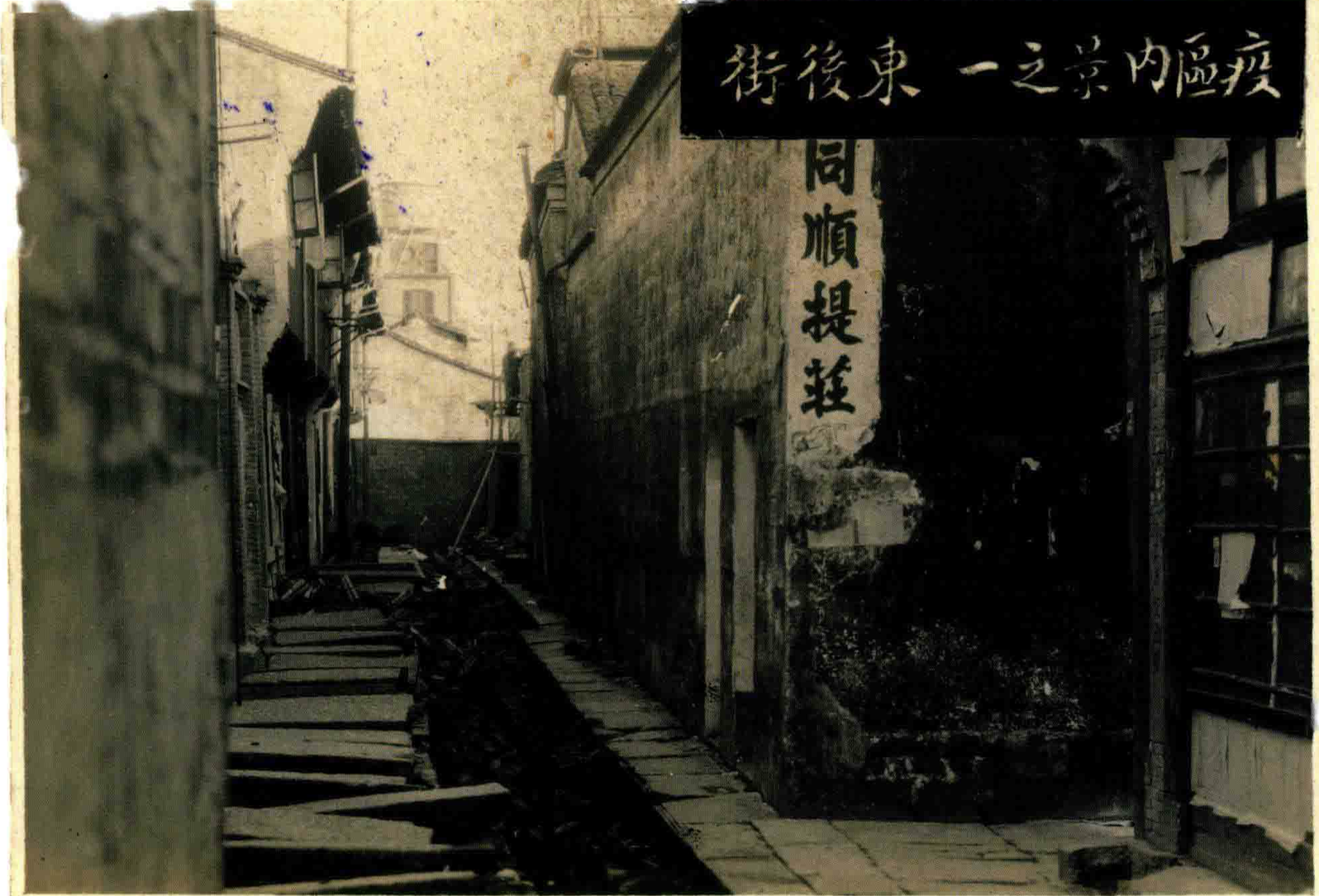
Donghou Street in 1940

In 1940, Ningbo had yet to have piped water, so it was common for households to collect rainwater in one or two large containers placed under the eaves of their courtyards for drinking and cooking. On the evening of 27 October, heavy rain in Ningbo washed wheat grains from rooftops into these water jars. Some poultry that consumed the wheat grains died the following day. People noticed a sudden increase in fleas in Donghou Street and Kaiming Street, but there were no reports of mass deaths in rodents. Rumours circulated that the Japanese air raid was actually a biological weapons attack.

On 30 October, according to the local Chinese-language newspaper Shishi Gongbao, an acute disease outbreak was reported in Kaiming Street of Ningbo, spreading severely. Within just three days, over 10 deaths were reported. Subsequently, people from neighbouring establishments such as Wang Shunxing's bakery, Hu Yuanxing's dominoes shop, Yuan Tai Hotel, Bao Changxiang underwear shop on East Zhongshan Road, and the vicinity of Donghou Street, all experienced fatalities. Infected individuals exhibited symptoms including high fever, headache, dizziness, staggering gait, occasional confusion, swelling, and pain in the lymph nodes, and diarrhoea before death. Initially, people mistook it for bubos or malignant malaria. People sought quinine from hospitals, but it proved ineffective. On the morning of 1 November, nearly ten households in Kaiming Street, East Main Road, Donghou Street, and Taiping Alley reported deaths, with an increasing number suffering from colds and fever. Nine people succumbed to the disease on that day alone.

=== Immediate responses ===
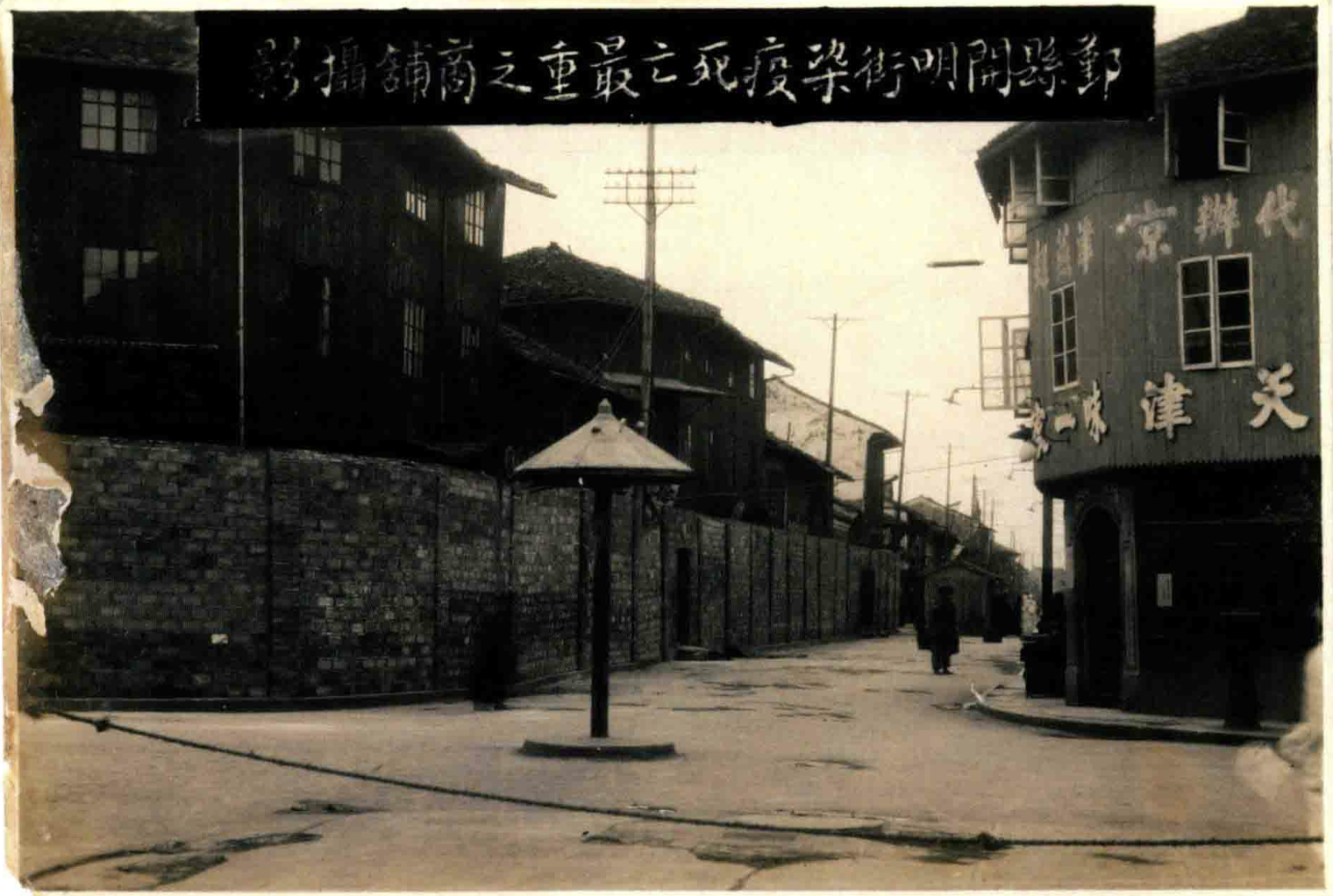
Kaiming Street in 1940

On 1 November, the government of Yin County invited physicians to form a prevention and control committee, with Zhang Fangqing, the director of the Central Hospital, appointed as the head of the Medical Affairs Department, and Sun Jinshi as the attending physician. Based on Sun Jinshi's preliminary diagnosis of patient symptoms, they suspected plague, with the majority of patients suffering from septicemic plague, and a minority from bubonic plague, with no cases of pneumonic plague detected. Ding Licheng, the director of Hwa Mei Hospital, stated that it was still uncertain whether it was a genuine plague.

On the evening of 2 November, the county government imposed a blockade and isolation on the area and conducted routine disinfection of households. As a preventive measure, bed sheets and cloth were burned, and officials promptly began vaccinations.

By November 3, 16 deaths had occurred, followed by another 7 on the next day. The highest recorded death toll in a single day was 20. Wails echoed along Kaiming Street, with mourners clad in mourning attire abound. Ding Licheng, the director of Hua Mei Hospital, obtained samples through lymph node puncture fluid examination, and had the plague bacillus detected by Hua Mei's examiner Xu Guofang, followed by multiple tests and rechecks by the provincial health department. On 4 November, Ding Licheng issued a statement to the Shishi Gongbao, officially declaring the epidemic as "plague".

=== Quarantine ===
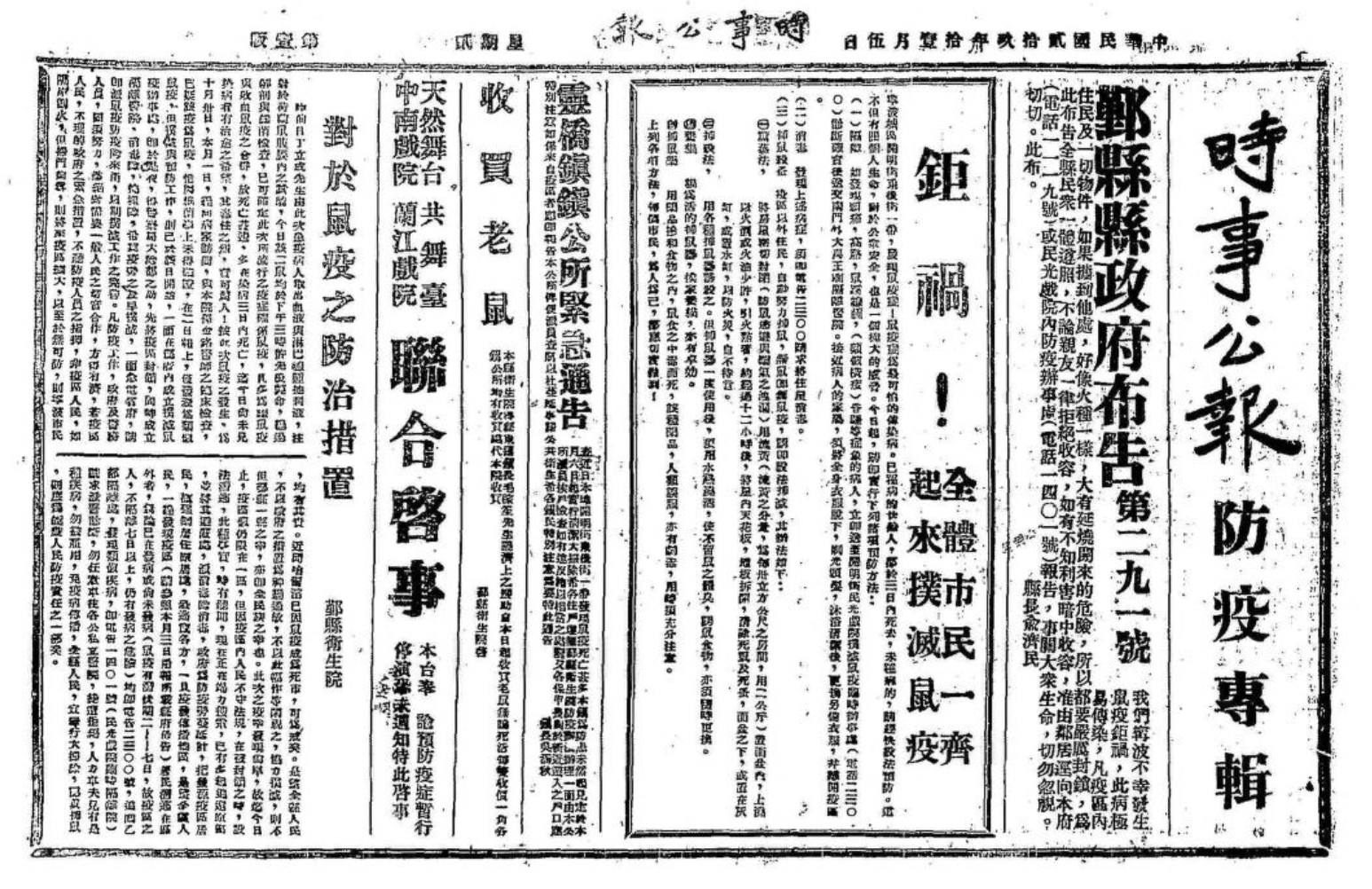
Shishi Gongbao, 5 November special issue for disease control

From 4 November onwards, an isolation zone spanning over 5000 square metres around the affected area was demarcated. Considering the inconvenience of transporting patients to Dayuwangmiao, due to its distance from the outbreak site, a Class A Isolation Hospital was established in Tongshun Store within the isolation zone to admit patients exhibiting clear symptoms. Additionally, a Class B Isolation Hospital was established at Kaiming Lecture Hall on Kaiming Street adjacent to the outbreak area to accommodate individuals suspected of being infected. On 5 November, the local newspaper Shishi Gongbao issued an official announcement titled Great Disaster: All Citizens Unite to Eradicate the Plague, along with the publication of the first epidemic prevention special edition. Subsequently, daily updates on epidemic prevention measures continued to be featured.

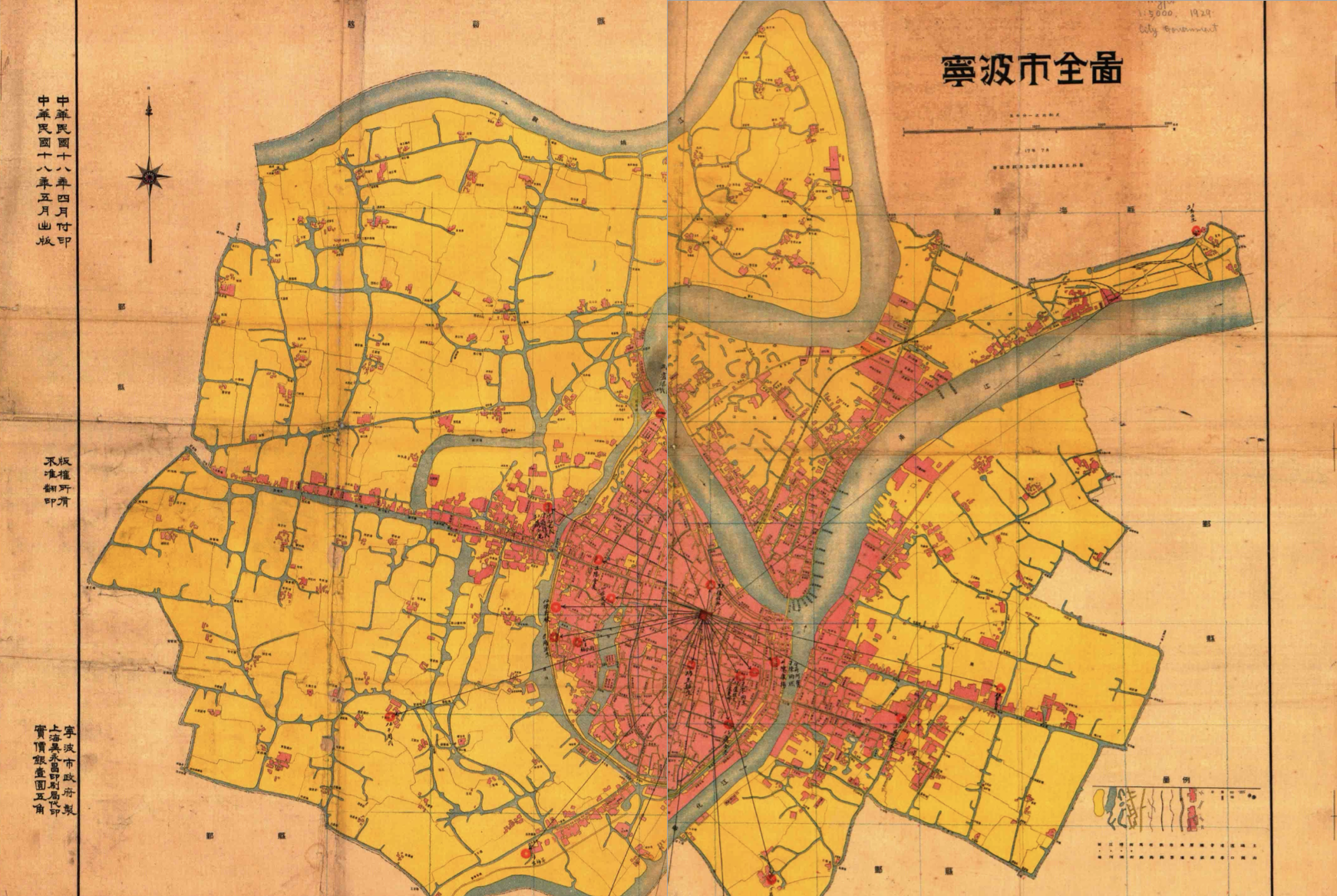
Map showing where the escapees went

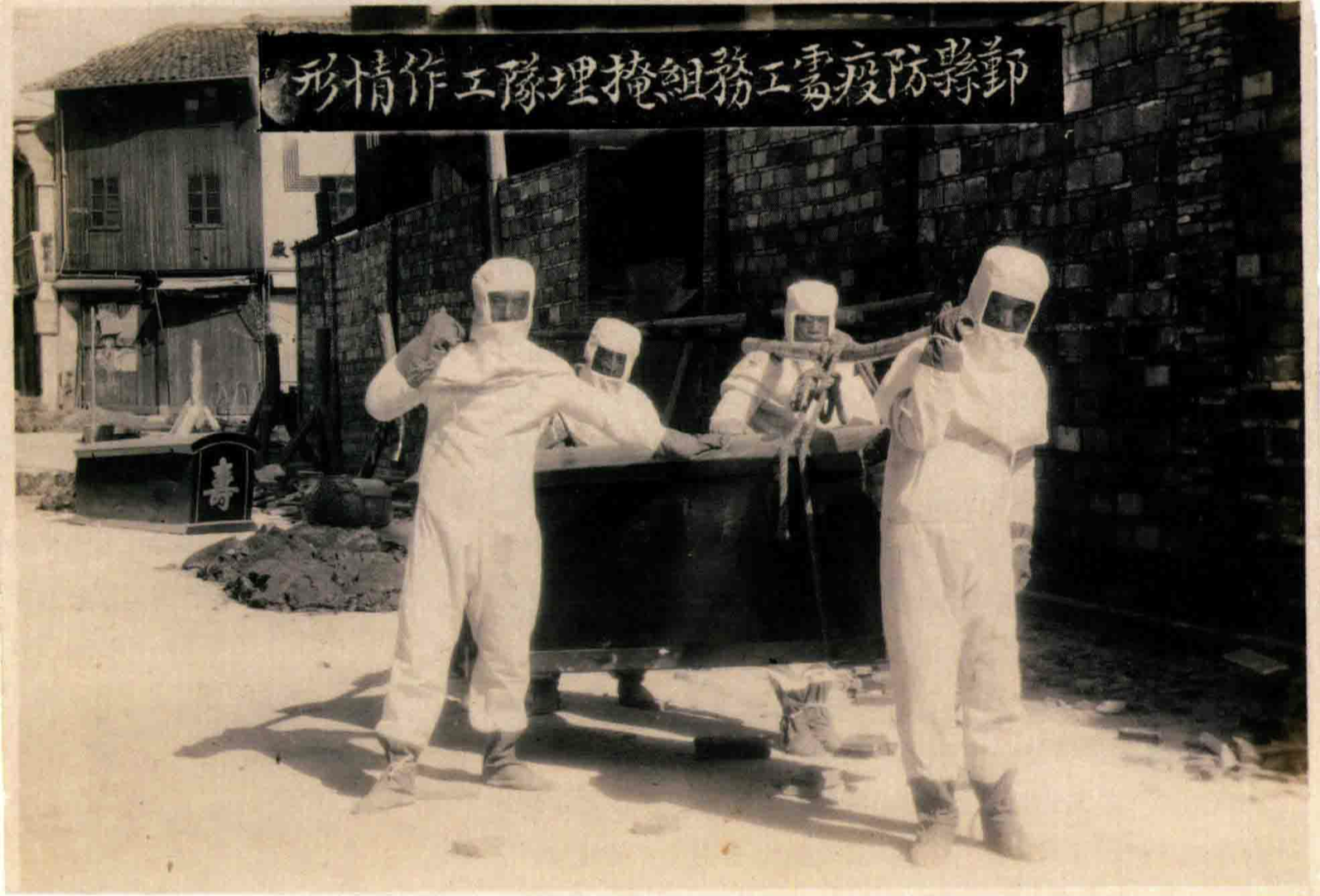
The burial team of the government

The county secretary, Zhang Hongbin, assumed temporary control of the county government, and on 6 November, the Yin County Epidemic Prevention Office was established, concurrently forming a team to search for fugitive patients. Township governments under the county also issued a notice refusing to accommodate residents from the affected area. Schools, public places, hotels, and restaurants ceased operations one after another. From that day onwards, families were prohibited from burying bodies privately, and all deceased patients were required to be buried deep in Laolongwan in the southwest suburbs.

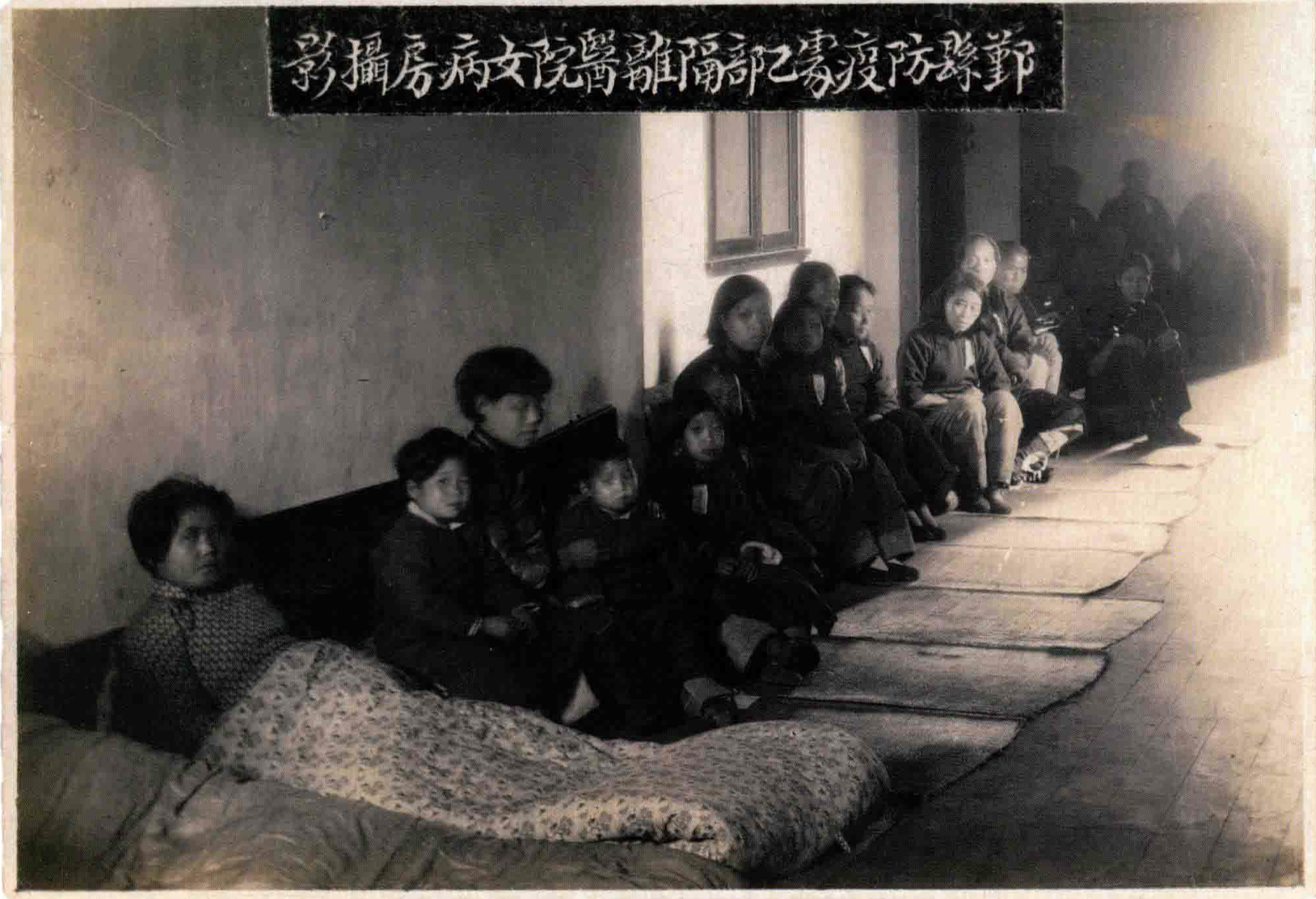
Class B quarantine hospital

Starting on 7 November, three quarantine hospitals—designated as Class A, Class B, and Class C—were established. Class A was tasked with treating confirmed plague patients, while Part B oversaw asymptomatic residents under observation within the affected area. Part C dealt with suspected patients both inside and outside the epidemic area. The Class A and Class C hospitals were located at Tongshun Store and Kaiming Hermitage. The Class B hospital was within the Yongyao Power Building. Residents' clothing, miscellaneous items, and furniture were disinfected and transported by stretcher teams.

To address the issue of handling materials within the epidemic area, a property registration office was established to register all houses and items within the epidemic area. For valuable or movable items, disinfection was mandatory before removal from the epidemic area. Two large stoves were constructed on the open ground of Kaiming Lane in the southwest corner of the epidemic area for boiling and disinfection purposes. Disinfection personnel wore protective clothing and hats, and based on the household information in the registration book, items were removed for disinfection house by house, with family members responsible for collection.

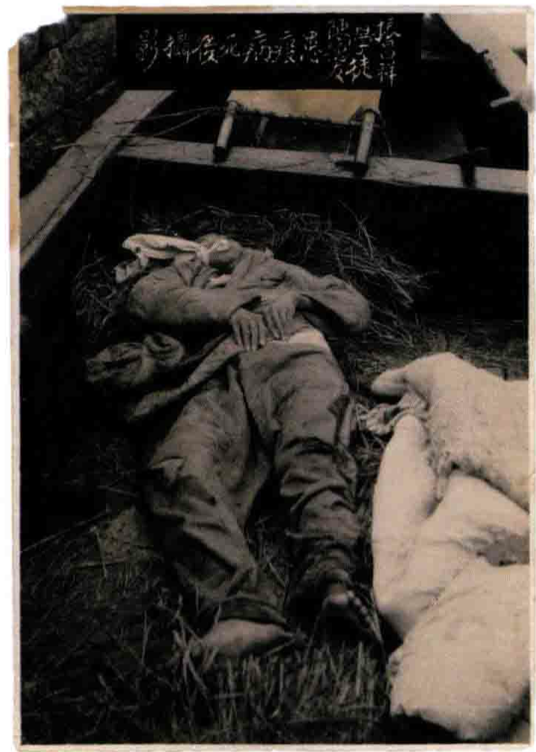
A shop assistant died in a boat when escaping the city

On 8 November, the Yin County government held its second epidemic prevention meeting, mandating that residents within the epidemic area and other relevant individuals must receive preventive injections of the plague vaccine. To facilitate this, the county government established a dedicated vaccination team, covering an area from the epidemic area centred around Kaiming Street, extending east to Qizha Street, south to Daliang Street, west to the North and South Main Roads, and north to Cangshui Street in the city centre. All residents, including primary and secondary school students, were required to receive the vaccination. On 10 November, Chen Wanli, Director of the Zhejiang Provincial Health Bureau, led the 17th Epidemic Prevention Team of the National Health Administration to Ningbo with the vaccines. In total, 23,343 individuals received the injections.

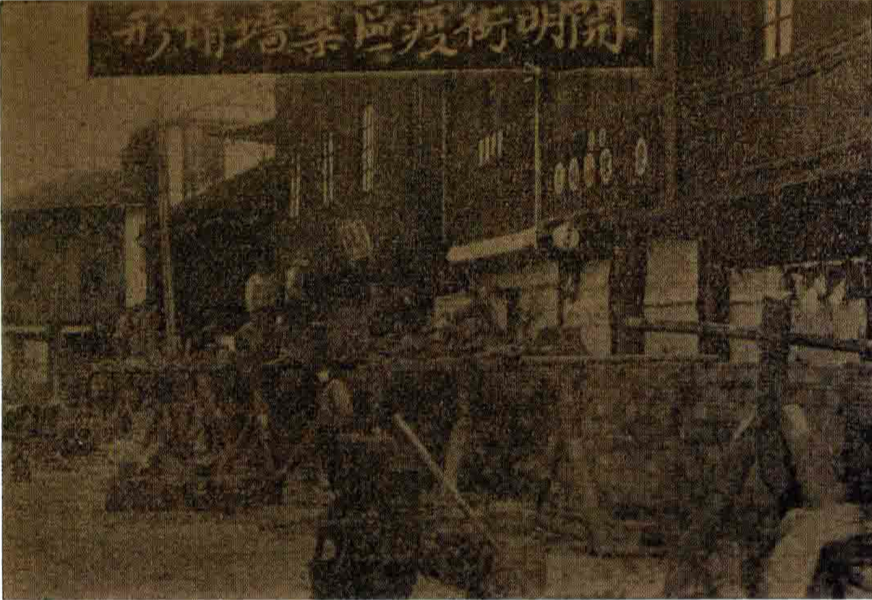
Construction of the quarantine wall

From 8 November onwards, a wall measuring over one yard high was erected around the perimeter of the epidemic area. The wall's surface was plastered with mud and covered with arched white iron sheets on the top. Additionally, a three-foot wide and four-foot deep isolation trench was dug outside the wall to prevent the spread of the epidemic, ensuring that plague-infested fleas could not escape. To prevent the spread of the disease, the disinfection team implemented a series of measures. They primarily sealed the cracks along the street walls with white paper and sprayed lime water along the way. Shops and houses were sealed and subjected to 12 hours of sulphur fumigation for disinfection. Furthermore, ceilings and floors were pried open and filled with lime water to thoroughly remove the bodies of dead rats. Additionally, all domestic animals such as dogs and cats within the epidemic area were culled.

On 14 November, the search team for escaped patients successfully apprehended 14 individuals.Subsequently, a total of 38 residents who had fled the epidemic area were gradually recovered. Shockingly, the number of deaths among those who escaped the area reached as high as 32 individuals. From 15 November onward, concerns about personal safety were openly expressed by those responsible for sealing off and isolating the area. Since 23 November, there had been public complaints and protests against the isolation measures. Local media also began questioning the authenticity of the epidemic, with those raising doubts and objections being officially rebutted and condemned. However, there were few who questioned the isolation measures themselves, indicating community understanding of the corresponding risks and support for such actions.

=== Burning ===
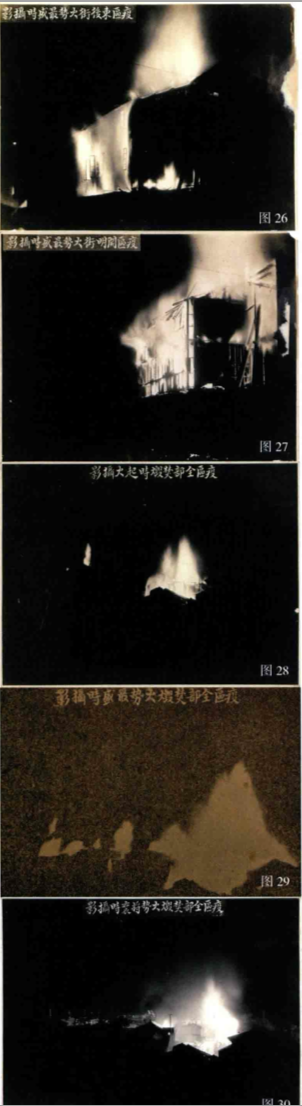
Fire of Kaiming Street

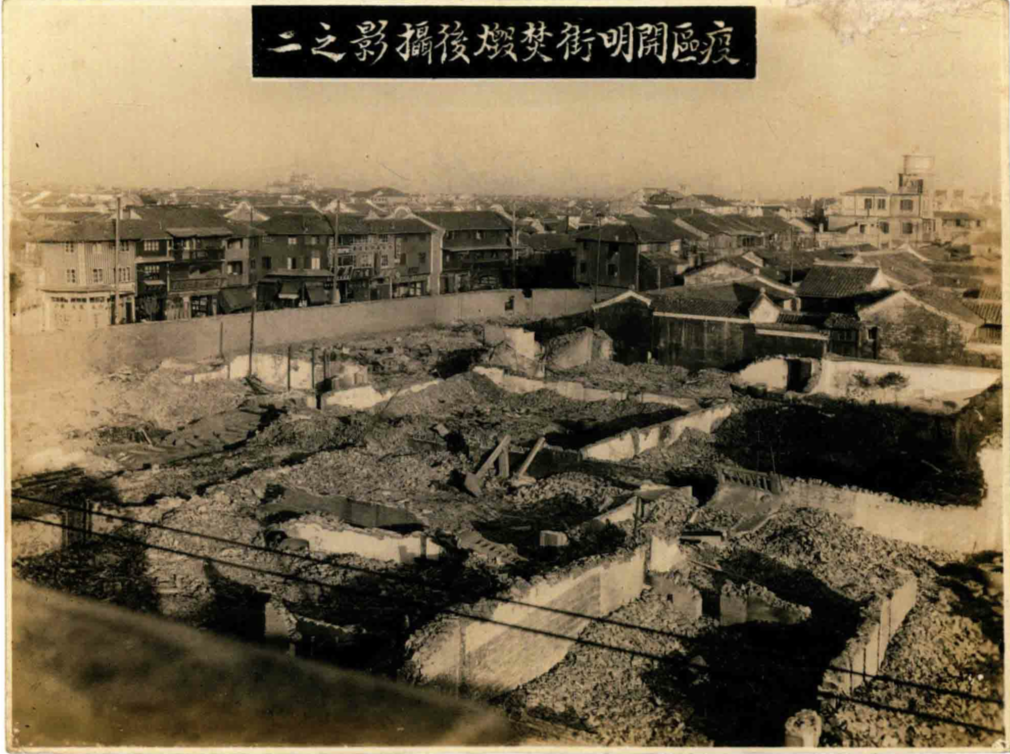
Kaiming Street after fire

The epidemic area comprised over 200 houses, mostly of brick and wood construction. Along East Main Road and Kaiming Street, the street-facing houses typically had three floors or pseudo-floors, while those within the alleys were mostly one or two story buildings. It would be challenging to thoroughly eradicate the source of the epidemic, as experts concluded that the area was relatively concentrated and situated in a bustling urban district. Additionally, beneath these houses, there used to be a small river that was purchased and filled in by homeowners during the expansion of East Main Road. However, in some areas, remnants of the river remained, filled with debris, making it challenging to disinfect using conventional methods.

At the 19th anti-epidemic meeting held on 28 November, due to the poor condition of the houses in the epidemic area and its low-lying location, which made it an ideal breeding ground for rats and fleas, the county government decided to burn down the epidemic area. The burning operation commenced at 7 p.m. on 30 November and was overseen by officials from the Provincial Health Department and local residents of Ningbo. Prior to the burning, nearby streets were closed to traffic, and surrounding buildings were protected by the fire brigade. Except for valuable items that could be disinfected and removed, all other belongings within the epidemic area were incinerated. Provincial Health Department Director Chen Wanli inspected the area and approved the decision.

On 30 November 1940, the authorities of Yin County carried out their plan to burn down all the houses in the epidemic area. Several points were selected within the epidemic area as ignition points, where straw was laid down and soaked with petrol, and designated routes were established for the fire setters. The perimeter was tightly guarded by military and police forces, and the entire city's fire brigade was mobilized to protect the safety of buildings outside the epidemic area. At around six or seven in the evening, fires were simultaneously ignited at 11 locations within the epidemic area, and flames shot up into the sky, lasting for a full four hours. All the residences, shops, and factories within the epidemic area were engulfed by the blaze. A total of 115 households, comprising 137 houses, and 5000 square meters of buildings were reduced to rubble overnight. The fire spread to the houses across East Avenue, blackening their outer walls and sending sparks flying. The fire brigade then aimed their hoses at these row houses and activated the water pumps. In North Taiping Lane, where the road was narrow, houses were specifically protected by sprinkler heads.

The specific areas burned included 224 to 268 East Zhongshan Road, Jiang Zhongji to Jiuhe Xiang Smoke Shop, 64 to 98 Kaiming Street, 139, 133, 129, 128, 127, 126, 125, 124, 123, 122, 121, 120, 118, 130 (Tongshun Store), 131, 134, 136 (Wang Renlin), 138, 132, 140, 141 (Xu Shenglai), 142, and 143 Donghou Street. Additionally, there were 8 upstairs houses, 5 front and back small coverings, and 3 high-level flat-roofed houses in the Kaiming Street temple, and 28 third-floor market houses and 3 second-floor market houses in Taiping Lane. Until the 1960s, this burned area was still referred to as the "plague field". After the Imperial Japanese Army entered Ningbo in 1941, they demolished the isolation walls.

== Investigations ==
=== Nationalist government ===
==== Theory of local origins ====
In October to November 1940, Chen Wanli from the Zhejiang Provincial Health Department and others involved in the prevention and control of the plague in Zhejiang, such as Liu Jingbang, did not believe that the plague in Ningbo at that time was caused by Japanese biological weapons.

On 5 November, the Shishi Gongbao published an article titled "Investigating the Origin of the Disease", which rejected the speculation of Japanese biological weapons and put forward the "local origin" theory. The article pointed out that a similar plague event occurred in the Donghou Street area of Kaiming Street, which was initially suspected to be caused by enemy aircraft spreading poison. However, based on factual inference, several factors may have contributed to the outbreak: the Donghou Street area used to have a city moat, which was filled with garbage when the riverbed was filled. In the garbage pile, dead rats were inevitably mixed in. Due to the long decomposition of dead rats or the breeding of toxins in the garbage, once they entered the human body, it would trigger a plague-like outbreak. From this report, it can be inferred that the source of the plague in Ningbo this time was similar to the Qingyuan plague in 1938, both originating locally due to "rotting dead rats" or "garbage brewing toxins" leading to the occurrence of the plague.

==== Theory of biological warfare ====
On 28 November 1940, the Japanese bombed Jinhua, scattering granular particles resembling fish eggs, which were confirmed to contain Yersinia pestis. On 5 December, Huang Shaohong, the Chairman of the Zhejiang Provincial Government, telegraphed all county magistrates, instructing them to immediately report any outbreaks and establish epidemic prevention committees to promptly seal off affected areas and isolate patients. He also reported the finding to Chiang Kai-shek via telegram, asserting that his province was under the attack of Japanese biological weapons.

On 29 November 1940, the Shishi Gongbao reported that Japanese aircraft attacked Jinhua on 28 November, and in addition to releasing poison gas, also dispersed Gram-negative bacilli, attempting to attack civilians. By December 3, the Shishi Gongbao suggested that the source of the plague in Ningbo was "enemy aircraft spreading poison", but stopped short of making a definitive statement, only stating that "the enemy's intentions are sinister, and poisoning is possible." However, Ningbo health officials remained divided on whether the epidemic in Ningbo originated from Japanese biological weapons.

On 10 December 1940, Chen Wanli reported to the Nationalist Government, stating, "About a week before the onset of the illness, enemy aircraft dropped about 2 liters of wheat over the epidemic area. Whether this is related to the epidemic is yet to be determined." By mid-December, Chen Wanli, Liu Jingbang, and Ke Zhuguang confirmed that the plague in Qu County and Jinhua was the result of "enemy aircraft spreading poison". Huang Shaoheng, Chairman of the Zhejiang Provincial Government, pointed out in his report to the Nationalist Government that there was a strong correlation between the Ningbo plague and the suspected Japanese aircraft dissemination, citing evidence of Japanese aircraft dispersing plague bacilli in Jinhua, which could prove Japan's use of bacteriological warfare. While Zhejiang's provincial government introduced a law to manage airdrops from Japanese aircraft, Chen Wanli and other Zhejiang health officials were disbelieved by the experts of National Health Administration, including Robert Pollitzer.

==== Further investigations ====
In December 1940, the National Health Administration convened a national health technology conference in Chongqing to discuss the plague in Ningbo. During the meeting, Chen Wengui, a microbiologist, who attended the meeting, pointed out that the Japanese had conducted bacteriological warfare in China, but he was accused of being overly sensitive by the conference chairman. During the Zhejiang Plague Consultation Conference chaired by Jin Baoshan, Robert Pollitzer expressed skepticism about the theory of bacteriological warfare causing the plague.

The Nationalist government received accusations stating that the epidemic was not the plague and that burning down houses was unnecessary. In January 1941, Jin Baoshan dispatched the Director of the Epidemic Prevention Department, Rong Qirong, and others to investigate in Zhejiang. Before arriving in Ningbo, Pollitzer had already confirmed the situation of blood smears at the provincial health department and verified the conditions of the disease and its onset. The investigation proposed two theories: one was that the epidemic originated from elsewhere and spread to Ningbo, as there had been a plague outbreak in Qingyuan, southern Zhejiang; the other was that Japanese aircraft had spread fleas and other substances by dropping wheat and grains. However, the transport from Qingyuan to Ningbo was extremely inconvenient, and no outbreaks occurred along the way. The areas where Japanese aircraft dropped the most wheat and grains also had the highest death tolls. Additionally, strange fleas were found in the epidemic area, slightly smaller in size and red in color, distinct from local fleas. After the investigation, Rong Qirong supported Pollitzer's judgment, believing there was not enough scientific evidence for biological warfare.

On 5 March 1941, Chen Wanli, the highest health official of Zhejiang, informed Yu Jimin, the Magistrate of Yin County, requesting the submission of post-growing photographs of airdropped wheat as evidence, to be forwarded to Chongqing for verification. He also mentioned that detailed records of plague cases from the previous year and investigations related to patient onset needed to be provided urgently in response to central government requests. Chen Wanli further instructed Zhang, the director of the Yin County Health Bureau, to submit detailed records of plague cases from the previous year and to send a copy of the plague patient investigation form. He emphasized that all documents needed to be submitted within ten days for transmission to the central authorities, including information on the isolation status of all patients and the entire period of quarantine work.

On 4 November 1941, using the same method, the Japanese attacked Changde, resulting in 2810 being infected with the plague. Immediately after the attack, Chen Wengui led a team to investigate. He performed autopsies on the bodies and injected lymph node puncture blood from patients into guinea pigs, which died five days later. By observing patient samples and conducting pathological analysis, it was concluded that the patients died from sepsis caused by Yersinia pestis. Chen Wengui compiled the evidence gathered into the "Investigation Report on the Plague in Changde, Hunan", confirming Japanese bacteriological warfare. However, the Nationalist government, considering the matter's impact on international credibility, altered the report. It was not until 1950 that the report resurfaced from the archives.

=== Imperial Japanese Army ===
==== Indirect sources ====
The Japanese military monitored the local media reports and regularly dispatched military aircraft to surveil the situation. The air raids resulted in a plague outbreak, leading to the success of bacteriological warfare attacks by rapidly disseminating a certain bacterial vector through aircraft. This development pleased Shiro Ishii. Ishii concluded that for successful attacks, bacteria should not be dispersed from high altitudes; instead, fleas and pathogens should be released together. Additionally, Shiro Ishii specifically filmed the Ningbo plague as a documentary to publicise his achievements. On 25 November 1940, the Imperial Japanese Army instructed to terminate the experiments, with all participants instructed to return to their original units and maintain secrecy. By the end of 1940, the Emperor ordered the expansion of Unit 731, increasing its personnel to 3,000 and establishing the Hailar Detachment, Sunwu Detachment, Hailin Detachment, and Linkou Detachment. Starting from 1940, an annual budget of 10 million yen was allocated to Unit 731. Shiro Ishii, the commander of Unit 731, was promoted to Major General on 1 March 1941.

==== Field study ====
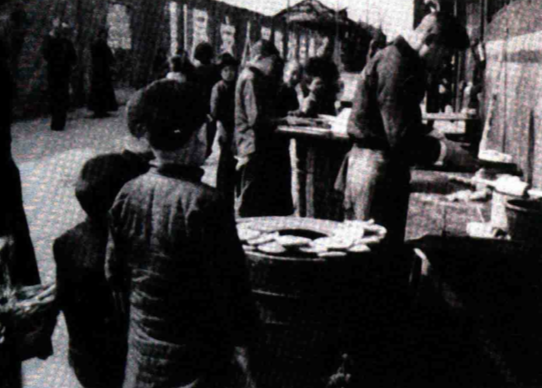
The wall of plague field after the Japanese occupation in 1941

In April 1941, following the Japanese occupation of Ningbo, a further investigation into the effectiveness of the plague attack in Ningbo was launched. The Kwantung Army transferred five researchers from Unit 731 to Nanjing to collaborate with Unit Ei 1644 in investigating the effectiveness of the plague attack in Ningbo. In early May, eleven senior Japanese generals visited the vicinity of the epidemic area to meet with Jin Tirong, who was responsible for epidemic prevention work in 1940. They extensively queried the occurrence of the plague in Ningbo, including when and where it first occurred, which household was initially affected, whether there was aircraft dispersal of wheat, and whether there were accusations from the local population against the Japanese military, among other details. This questioning lasted for about two hours, and the contents were meticulously recorded.

==== Kaneko thesis ====
According to the doctoral thesis of Junichi Kaneko, a military doctor of Unit 731, on 27 October 1940, Unit 731 scattered 2 kilograms of plague bacteria over Ningbo, Zhejiang Province, using aircraft. According to the data shown in the thesis's charts, the plague began to spread in Ningbo on 30 October, with 3 cases reported on the 31st, increasing to 9 cases on 1 November, peaking at 13 cases on the 6th, 10 cases on the 8th, 8 cases on the 9th, and 7 cases on the 12, gradually declining thereafter until the last case on 7 December, lasting a total of 39 days with 112 reported cases. Patients who escaped from the epidemic area created conditions for a "second infection". According to research conducted by the Japanese military in Ningbo, it was found that 1450 people died in the second round of infections.

On 15 October 2011, representatives of the Tokyo-based citizen organization "Revealing the Truth of Unit 731's Bacterial Warfare" and five others, including Professor Matsamura Takao from Keio University and Wang Xuan, a descendant of victims of bacterial warfare in China, held a press conference in Tokyo. They urged the Japanese government to disclose information on bacterial warfare and face up to historical truths. The organization discovered the first part of a classified military report from the Army Medical School's Epidemic Research Institute, titled "Estimation of PX's Effectiveness", at the Kansai Branch of the National Diet Library in Kyoto. This report directly documented Japan's conduct of bacterial warfare in China, challenging the Japanese government's claim of "no evidence" in response to Chinese accusations of Unit 731's bacterial warfare.

The cover of the report bears the words "Military Secret" and contains the name of a senior military doctor who graduated from Teikyo University and recorded the content on December 14, 1943. The report explains that "PX" refers to fleas infected with Yersinia pestis, and it calculates the effectiveness of spreading bacteria bombs on the battlefield. The report lists the quantities of PX used and the number of infected individuals in various locations in China, including Nong'an, Quzhou, Ningbo, Changde, Guangxin, Guangfeng and Yushan. It states that over 26,000 people were infected once or twice, defining PX as "the best bacterial bomb, capable of causing psychological and economic panic".

== Trials ==
=== Khabarovsk, Soviet Union ===
On 25 December 1949, the Soviet Union began the trial of Japanese prisoners of war involved in bacteriological warfare in Khabarovsk. During the Khabarovsk trial, Japanese prisoners admitted to the events of the "aerial dissemination of pathogens" that took place in Ningbo in 1940. Susumu Hatano testified that the experiment in Ningbo was the first actual field test and, because it was conducted on enemy territory, the results were inconclusive. However, the Japanese military drew conclusions about the bacteriological warfare experiment based on information recorded in Ningbo newspapers and laboratory test data.

On 29 December 1949, a forensic medical examination committee composed of six medical biologists, including academician Zhukov-Verezhnikov, from the Soviet Academy of Medical Sciences, studied all the materials related to the criminal case against Japanese prisoners charged with preparing and using bacteriological weapons. The committee confirmed that the experiments and production conducted by the Japanese Kwantung Army's Unit 731, Unit 100, and Unit 1644 of the Japanese Expeditionary Forces in China were aimed at exploring and manufacturing bacteriological weapons, as well as researching methods for their use. The committee also confirmed that in 1940, under the leadership of Shiro Ishii, a combat expedition equipped with large quantities of bacillus anthracis, vibrio cholerae, and plague-infected fleas was sent to Ningbo. The aerial dissemination of plague-infected fleas by aircraft resulted in a plague epidemic in the Ningbo area.

After news of the Khabarovsk trial reached China, the Zhejiang Daily published a news article on 7 February 1950, stating that personnel from the Zhejiang Provincial Health Department, including Wang Yuzhen, Zheng Jie'an, Yu Hanjie, and Jin Qiu, submitted a written report in support of the Soviet Union's trial of Japanese bacteriological warfare criminals. The report criticized the Zhejiang Health Department at the time for not taking action when the Japanese military continuously disseminated plague bacteria in various areas of Zhejiang, instead covering up for the Imperial Japanese Army.

=== Tokyo ===
After the war, the activities of Unit 731 remained confidential and did not appear in the Tokyo Trials. It wasn't until the publication of The Devil's Gluttony in 1981 that the unit's activities were first revealed to the public. In the first half of the 20th century, including during World War II, dozens of lawsuits for wartime compensation were filed against the Japanese government and companies associated with Japanese aggression. However, almost all of these lawsuits were rejected by Japanese courts. Nevertheless, the Japanese government has never formally acknowledged that the Japanese military conducted bacteriological warfare.

In 1996, a group of Japanese anti-war activists came to China to investigate the victims of bacteriological warfare and expressed their willingness to help the victims sue the Japanese government for its crimes. Subsequently, in 1997 and 1999, a total of 180 plaintiffs from Zhejiang (Quzhou, Ningbo, Jiangshan, Yiwu), and Hunan (Changde) filed lawsuits against Japan, demanding that the Japanese government acknowledge its crimes of bacteriological warfare in China and apologise and compensate the victims.

During the five-year trial, veterans of Unit 731 admitted to participating in live dissections, cultivating agents such as anthrax, typhoid, and cholera, and releasing plague-infected fleas into villages. Plaintiffs from China flew to Japan to testify, describing how Japanese planes flew low and dropped infected wheat, rice, or cotton, leading to mysterious disease outbreaks in villages. Despite a series of confessions from former soldiers, the Japanese government acknowledged the unit's existence but still refused to disclose the scope of scientists' activities. During the debates in the Tokyo District Court, Chinese bacteriologist Huang Ketai pointed out that unlike previous epidemics, the Ningbo plague in 1940 occurred in winter rather than summer and was carried by fleas that were not native to the region, killing humans without affecting mice.

In 2002, based on 28 hearings and a large amount of evidence, the Tokyo District Court wrote a written summary confirming for the first time that the Japanese military conducted bacteriological warfare. However, many plaintiffs were angry at the rejection of their compensation claims and appealed. In 2005, the Tokyo High Court upheld the ruling of the Tokyo District Court in 2002 and rejected the request for an apology from the Japanese government for its biological warfare in China before and during World War II. The Japanese Supreme Court subsequently rejected the appeal, stating that international law prohibits foreign citizens from directly seeking compensation from the Japanese government.

== Memorials ==
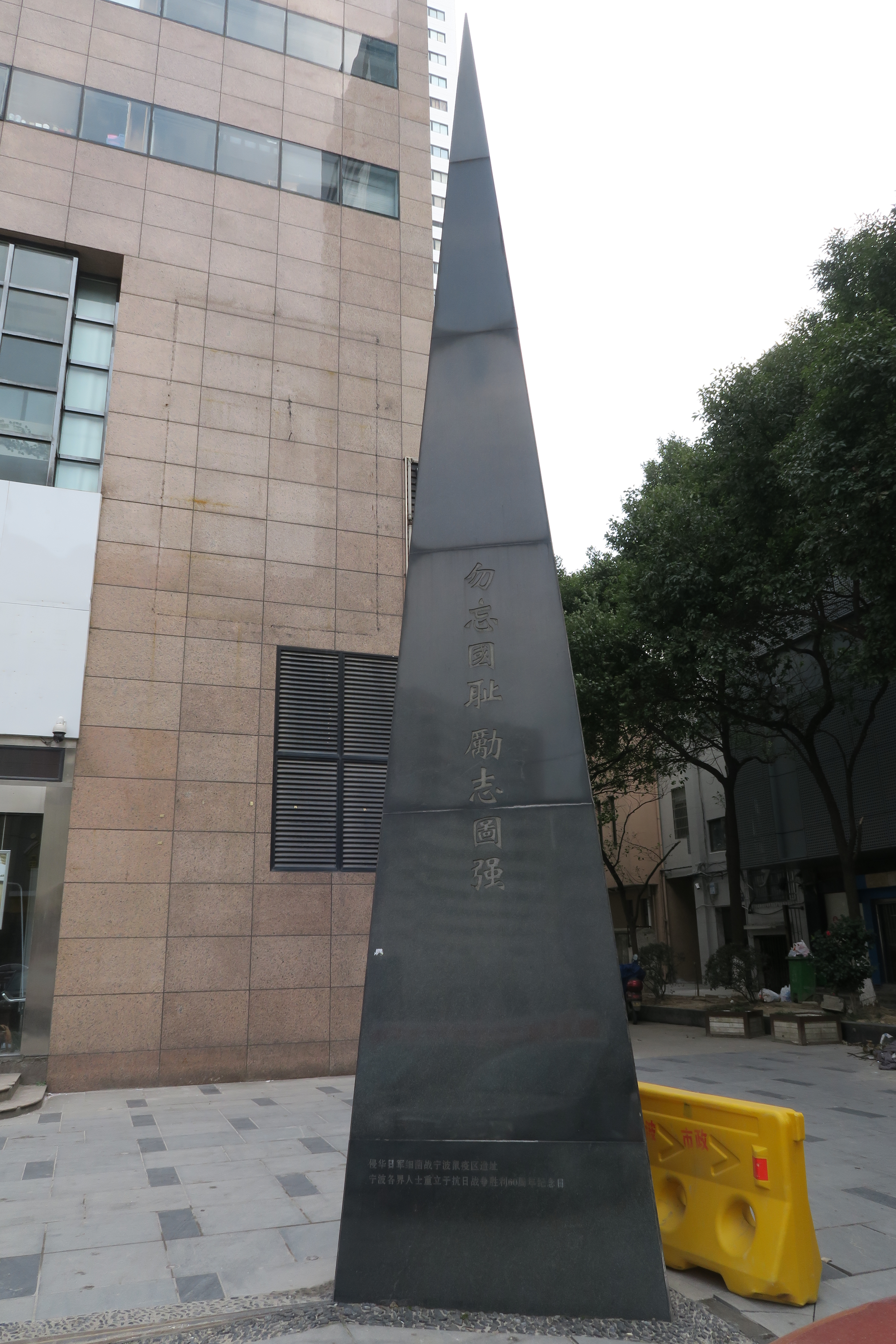
The Ningbo Plague Memorial Monument

On 3 September 1995, the Ningbo Municipal People's Government erected a monument on the pedestrian walkway of Kaiming Street, inscribed with the words "Site of the Plague Field in Ningbo Infected by the Bacteriological Warfare of the Japanese Invaders", with the central inscription reading "Never Forget National Humiliation, Strive to Strengthen the Nation". It was signed by "Various sectors of Ningbo City on the 50th anniversary of the victory of the War of Resistance Against the Japanese". In 2005, the monument was relocated to the original site of the bacteriological epidemic area on the west side of Tianyi Haoting. The new monument's front is engraved with the words "Do Not Forget National Humiliation, Strive to Strengthen the Nation", with bacteriological warfare historical materials and a list of victims carved on both sides.

In 2009, the Publicity Department of Haishu District Committee, the District Radio, Television, and News Bureau, the District Cultural Relics Management Office, and the Ningbo New Fourth Army Historical Research Association jointly established the "Ningbo Kaiming Street Plague Disaster Exhibition Hall" on the second floor of the Tianyi Business Circle Party and Mass Service Center. The curved wall on the right side of the entrance of the exhibition hall lists the names of all the victims. In the centre of the hall, there is a sand table displaying a model of the buildings in the Kaiming Street epidemic area, reconstructed according to the "Epidemic Area Map" provided by the family of the victim Hu Dingyang.
