= Unit 1855 =

Japanese human experimentation unit in China (1938–1945)

Unit 1855 was a unit for human experimentation that belonged to the central Epidemic Prevention and Water Purification Department of the North China Army of the Imperial Japanese Army, stationed in Beijing between 1938 and 1945.

Unit 1855 was established by the North China Army in 1938. The unit was located in a facility not far from the Temple of Heaven in Beijing, and had a staff of about 2000 men. The unit was commanded by the surgeon Col. Nishimura Yeni, who reported directly to Shirō Ishii at Unit 731.

According to the testimony of the Korean Choi Hyung Shi, who worked as an interpreter with Unit 1855 between 1942 and 1943, the Unit conducted experiments with plague, cholera and typhus on Chinese and Korean immigrants to China:

"When I first arrived there, some one hundred prisoners were already in the cells. Whenever the Japanese doctors made contact with the people being tested, they always did so through an interpreter. The test subjects were infected with plague, cholera and typhus. Those not yet infected were kept in different rooms. There were large mirrors in the rooms with the subjects so that those undergoing the testing could be observed better. I spoke with the prisoners using a microphone and looking through the glass panel, interpreted the questions from the doctors: "Do you have diarrhea? Do you have a headache? Do you feel chilly?" The doctors made careful records of all answers. With the typhus test, ten people were forced to drink a mixture of the germs, and five were administered the vaccine. The two groups were separated from each other. The vaccine proved effective with all five to whom it was administered. The other five suffered horribly. In the plague tests, the prisoners suffered with chills and fever, and groaned in pain...until they died. From what I saw, one person was killed every day."

It has been estimated, that Unit 1855 killed about 1000 people between 1938 and 1945.

The unit evacuated the facilities in Beijing during the Japanese defeat in 1945, and the Chinese entered the building, which was not destroyed and was still standing as of 1996.

== Branches ==
Unit 1855 had a branch in Chinan, which was a combination of prison and experiment center.
