= Unit Ei 1644 =

Japanese biological warfare facility (1939–1945)

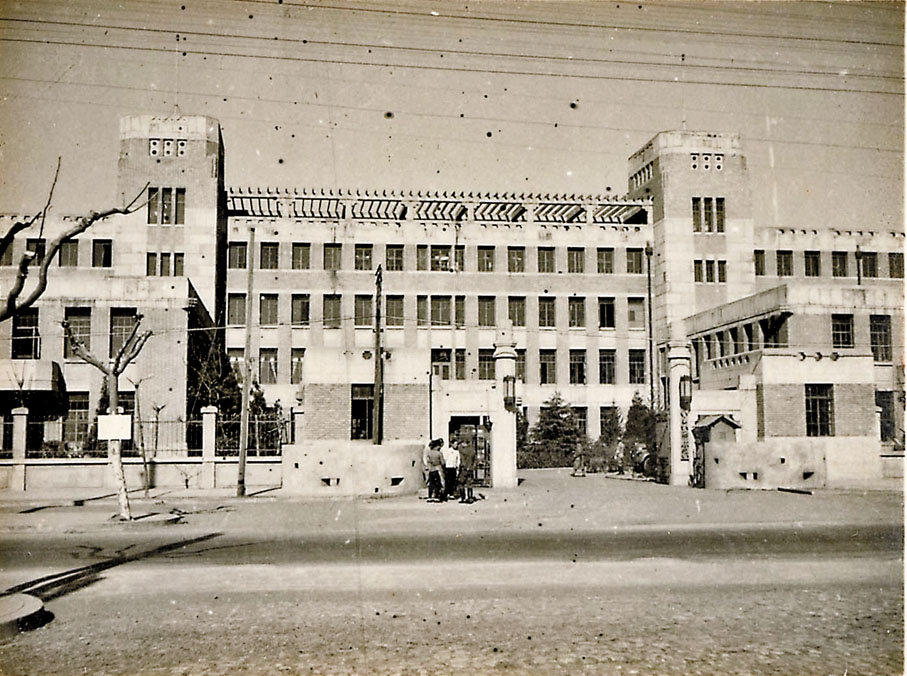
- Headquarters of Unit Ei 1644 in Nanjing
- Location: Nanjing, Jiangsu, China
- Date: 1939–1945
- Attack type: Human experimentation; Biological warfare; Chemical warfare
- Weapons: Biological weapons; Chemical weapons
- Deaths: Unknown, no documented survivors
- Perpetrators: Colonel Masuda Tomosada; Epidemic Prevention and Water Purification Department

Unit Ei 1644 (Japanese: 栄1644部隊) — also known as Unit 1644, Detachment Ei 1644, Detachment Ei, Detachment Tama, The Nanking Detachment, or simply Unit Ei, was a Japanese laboratory and biological warfare facility under control of the Epidemic Prevention and Water Purification Department. It was established in 1939 in Japanese-occupied Nanjing as a satellite unit of Unit 731. It had 12 branches and employed about 1,500 men.

During the Second Sino-Japanese War, Unit Ei engaged in "producing on a mass scale lethal bacteria to be used as weapons against the Chinese forces and civilian population" and "took a direct part in employing bacteriological weapons against the Chinese forces and local inhabitants during the military operations of the Japanese troops," according to its Chief, Shunji Sato.

== Founding ==
Unit Ei 1644 was established on April 18, 1939, as a branch operation of the China Anti-Epidemic Water Supply Unit. From the beginning, its primary purpose was to research biological warfare with the prevention of epidemics as a secondary focus. The reason for establishing the unit in Nanjing is unknown.

== Facilities ==
The facilities of Unit Ei 1644 were located in the heart of Nanjing, just across the street from the Japanese Army's military airport. The unit used an existing six-story Chinese hospital as its main building. The hospital building housed the offices of the commander and officers, while the prison and the research facilities were located in a four-story annex. The camp also contained many other facilities including barracks, a clothing disinfectant station and an incinerator for the disposal of human and animal remains as well as recreational facilities, such as a swimming pool. The perimeter was surrounded by a 3-meter-high brick wall topped with barbed wire as well as electrically charged wire in some areas. The area was patrolled at all times of the day by a special police unit.

While the soldiers that guarded the unit and the people involved in biological weapon research lived within the perimeter, officers and important civilian personnel lived off base.

== Human experiments ==
Sato claimed in his testimony that Unit Ei "did not conduct experiments on human beings."

An anonymous researcher, who claims he was attached to Unit 1644, says that it regularly carried out human vivisections as well as infecting humans with cholera, typhus, and bubonic plague. The researcher and his family had not yet reached an agreement about releasing his name.

The human experiments on Unit Ei 1644 took place in the confines of the fourth floor in the facility, which was out of bounds for the majority of the Unit Ei 1644. Reportedly, only a minority of the staff took part in the BW experiments on humans at Unit Ei 1644, such as the unit's doctors and high level technicians. Each week between ten and twenty persons were exposed to poisons, germs and different gases, and about ten were killed weekly by gases, lethal injections and bullets after having been used as test subjects.

A soldier stationed at the Unit testified, that ordinary soldiers were not allowed beyond the second floor and not informed that human experiments were taking place there, but they were aware of rumours to that effect. The soldier had heard that there were prisoners kept at the fourth floor, and was told by an officer: "There is a lumber storage facility on the fourth floor. You never go above the second floor, you got it." Several units referred to human test subjects and corpses as ‘logs’ to be burned/incinerated, also solidifying the soldier’s assumption of what really happened on floors they were not granted access to. There was an incinerator in the Unit in which dead prisoners were cremated.

Hiroshi Matsumoto testified:

"[the prisoners] were all naked and kept in cages that looked like cages for birds and animals, very small, in the size of 1.2 meters to 1.30 meters in hight, side and width. They had to always have their legs crossed... After we injected live germs in to prisoners, we would wait until germs spread in the blood, then we would take out all their blood".

After about six months of captivity, prisoners would be taken to the "treatment room" where they would be put to sleep with chloroform and cut open at their inguinal artery: after the body was emptied of enough blood "the body would start shaking in convulsions". The contaminated blood would then be used to infect food or given to flies who would then be used as a biological weapon.

When the war ended, the remaining test subjects were killed, the East Zhongshan Street complex was destroyed with explosive charges and the staff evacuated.

== Capabilities ==
Sato testified that while Chief of the Unit, it was "devising bacteriological weapons and producing them on a mass scale. For this purpose the Nanking Detachment Ei was supplied with high-capacity equipment and with bacteriological experts, and it produced lethal bacteria on a mass scale. Under my direction ... the Training Division every year trained about 300 bacteriologists with the object of employing them in bacteriological warfare."

According to Sato, "...the output of bacteria substance was 10 kilograms per production cycle." The facility also bred fleas for the purposes of plague infection.

Sato also testified about the equipment of Unit Ei, "The output capacity of the Nanking Detachment Ei 1644 for the production of lethal bacteria was up to 10 kilograms per production cycle." To produce this quantity of bacteria, Detachment Ei 1644 had the following equipment:

- Ishii cultivators, about 200; incubator room, 1, dimensions 5x5x3 meters;
- 2 cylindrical autoclaves, 1.5 meters in diameter and 2.5 meters long;
- incubators, about 40-50
- steam sterilizers, 40-50
- Koch boilers, about 40–50,

and for cooking media, the detachment had large retorts..."

== Members ==
The first Chief of Unit Ei was Shirō Ishii, then Colonel Oota. In February 1943, Sato was appointed Chief of Unit Ei. He served as Chief until February 1944. Sato testified at the Khabarovsk War Crime Trials that Unit Ei "possessed high-capacity equipment for the breeding of germs for bacteriological warfare."

Lieutenant Colonel Onadera was Chief of the General Division. Captain Murata was in charge of breeding fleas.

== Biological warfare ==
In late August 1942, Unit Ei participated in a biological attack against Chinese citizens and soldiers in Yushan County, Jinhua, and Fuqing. As Kawashima Kiyoshi testified, "..[The] bacteriological weapon was employed on the ground, the contaminating of the territory being done by sabotage action. ... The advancing Chinese troops entered the contaminated zone and came under the action of the bacteriological weapon." Cholera and plague cultures used during the attack were made at Unit Ei. Sato testified he was told that "plague, cholera and paratyphoid germs were employed against the Chinese by spraying. The plague germs were disseminated through fleas, the other germs in the pure form—by contaminating reservoirs, wells, rivers, etc." The plague fleas were also from Unit Ei.

A Japanese who was part of Unit Ei 1644 admitted that the Japanese suffered a major disaster in their 1942 biological weapons attack in Zhejiang, saying that he saw papers which said 1,700 killed at the Epidemic Prevention and Water Purification Department but admitted Japanese regularly downplayed their own casualties so the real death toll was higher.

== Aftermath ==
When the war ended, the remaining test subjects were killed, the East Zhongshan Street complex was destroyed with explosive charges and the staff evacuated.
