= Valley Forge Military College =

Private military junior college in Pennsylvania

Coordinates: 40.054°N 75.384°W

- Motto: Courage • Honor • Conquer
- Type: Private military junior college
- Established: 1935
- President: Col. Stuart B. Helgeson, USMC (Ret.)
- Location: Wayne, Radnor Township, Pennsylvania, United States
- Campus: Suburban
- Website: www.vfmcollege.edu

Valley Forge Military College (VFMC) is a private military junior college in Wayne, Pennsylvania. VFMC, known as the Military College of Pennsylvania, offers thirteen undergraduate majors.

The college was formerly part of Valley Forge Military Academy and College until 2023, when it became a separate institution.

== History ==
Valley Forge Military College (VFMC) began as a two-year junior college pilot program within Valley Forge Military Academy during the 1935–36 academic year, when the first college-level cadets joined the Corps of Cadets. The institution adopted the designation of Valley Forge Military Academy and Junior College shortly thereafter. Over the next decades, VFMC evolved into a fully independent institution, attaining recognition as a military junior college by the U.S. Department of Defense between the 1940s and 1960s.

The college became coeducational in 2005. In 2007, the Pennsylvania House unanimously adopted a resolution designating VFMC as the official military college of the Commonwealth of Pennsylvania.

In 2023, the college became a separate institution with its own governing board, president, staff, and operations, while still sharing the campus with the academy. The academy closed in 2026 due to high costs and declining enrollment.

== Academics ==
VFMC offers thirteen Associate degrees across arts and sciences disciplines, structured around twelve core competencies such as leadership, critical thinking, and emotional intelligence. It is accredited by the Middle States Commission on Higher Education.

== ROTC and Early Commissioning Program (ECP) ==
The college participates in the U.S. Army ROTC and is one of only four institutions nationwide—and the only one in the Northeast—to offer the Early Commissioning Program (ECP), allowing students to commission as Second Lieutenants after two years of study.

== Notable alumni ==
=== Athletics ===
- George Deiderich – consensus All-American, professional football player, CFL (Montreal Alouettes, Ottawa Rough Riders)
- Chris Doleman – retired professional football player and Pro Football Hall of Famer
- Jeff Otah – professional football player, NFL (Carolina Panthers)
- Julian Peterson – professional football player, NFL (Seattle Seahawks, San Francisco 49ers, Detroit Lions)

=== Military ===
- Harry E. Miller Jr. – major general who commanded the 42nd Infantry Division
- Brendan W. O'Connor – Master Sergeant, United States Army: Distinguished Service Cross — Afghanistan
- Gustave F. Perna – General, United States Army: Commanding General of the United States Army Materiel Command.
- Kevin R. Wendel – major general, United States Army: Commander, 3rd Brigade, 1st Cavalry Division, 20th Chemical, Biological, Radiological, Nuclear and high-yield Explosives Command, First Army Division East, First United States Army, Combined Security Transition Command – Afghanistan.

=== Politics ===
- Steve Chiongbian Solon – Governor of the province of Sarangani in the Philippines
- Bryan R. Lentz – Democratic politician: State Representative, Pennsylvania House of Representatives, 161st Legislative District
- Bob Mensch – Republican state senator: Pennsylvania State Senate, 24th Senate District
- Westley W.O. Moore – United States Army: Rhodes Scholar, White House Fellow, author of The Other Wes Moore, youth advocate, Governor of Maryland
- Simeon Saxe-Coburg-Gotha – King Simeon II of Bulgaria, and Prime Minister of Bulgaria from 2001 to 2005
