= 48th Chemical Brigade =

- 48th Chemical Brigade shoulder sleeve insignia
- Active: 12 March 1942 (as HHC, 81st Chemical Battalion) – present
- Country: United States
- Branch: U.S. Army
- Role: Chemical Defense
- Size: Brigade
- Part of: 20th CBRNE Command
- Garrison/HQ: Fort Hood, Texas
- Nickname: Spartans
- Motto: "TO PROTECT THE NATION"
- Engagements: Normandy (with arrowhead) Northern France; Rhineland; Ardennes-Alsace Central Europe
- Decorations: Presidential Unit Citation (Army); Campaign Streamer embroidered NORMANDY
- Website: https://home.army.mil/cavazos/units-tenants/48th-chemical-brigade

Commanders
- Current commander: Colonel Jacy Park
- Command Sergeant Major: Command Sergeant Major Chylander S. Cummings

Insignia
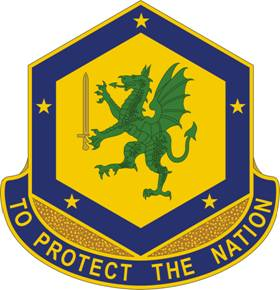
- Identification symbol

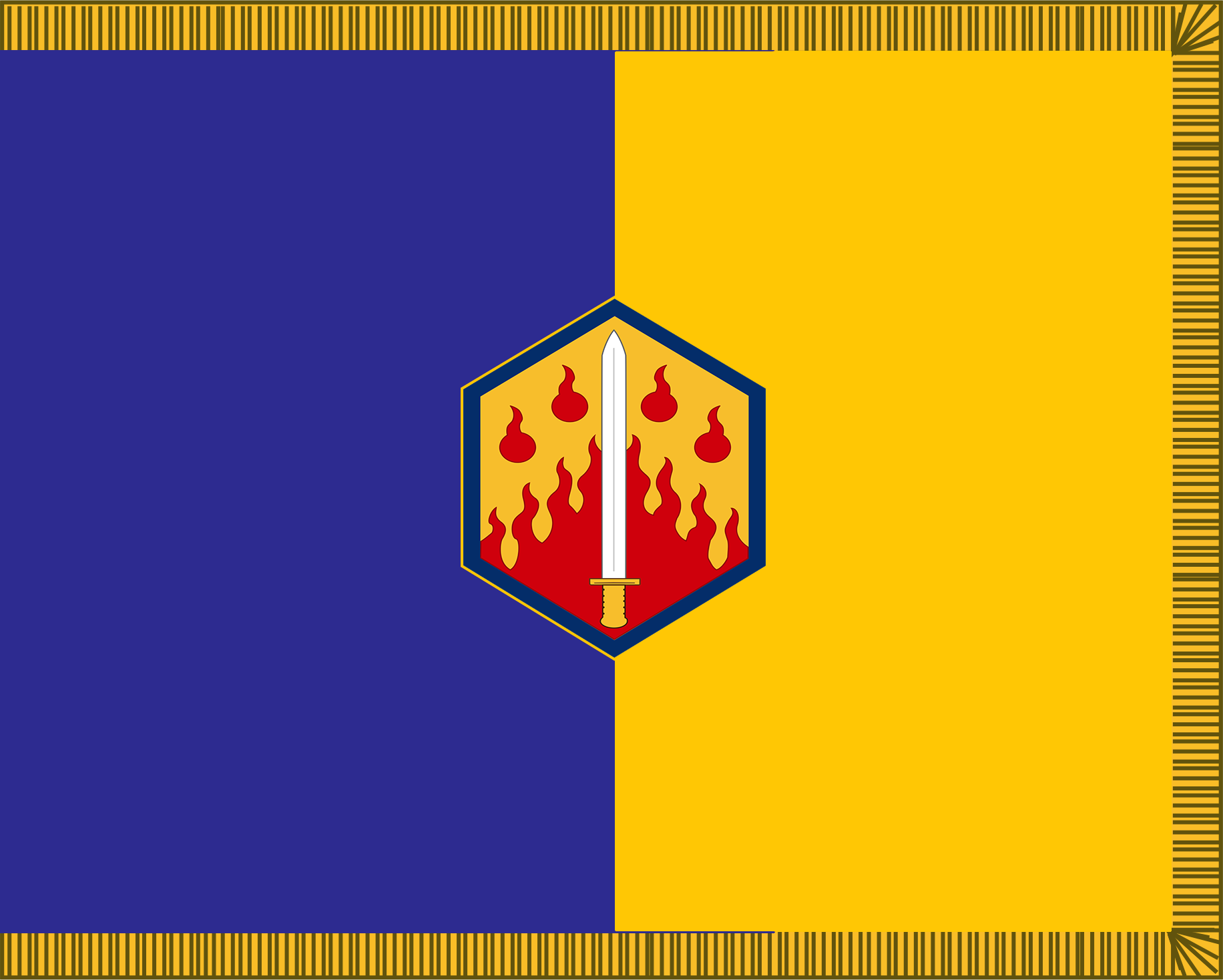
- 48th Chemical Brigade Flag

The 48th Chemical Brigade is a United States Army brigade located at Fort Hood, Texas and subordinate to the 20th CBRNE Command. The 48th Chemical Brigade is the only active duty CBRN defense brigade in the Army. The Brigade is tasked to discover, counter, and neutralize chemical, biological or nuclear threats. The Brigade was activated 16 September 2007, under the command of Colonel Vance P. (Phil) Visser and CSM E. Donald Moten.

== Lineage ==
The 48th Chemical Brigade began as the HHC, 81st Chemical Battalion on 12 March 1942 at Fort DA Russell, Texas. It was redesignated several times during World War II until its deactivation 7 November 1945 at Fort Leonard Wood, Missouri. The unit was reactivated at HHC, 81st Chemical Group and went through several reorganizations until it was again deactivated 12 September 1962 at Fort Bragg, North Carolina.

The Brigade was again activated 14 January 2000 as the 48th Chemical Brigade and activated 16 September 2007 at Fort Hood, Texas.

== Organization ==
- 48th Chemical Brigade, Fort Hood (TX)
- Headquarters and Headquarters Company, Fort Hood (TX)
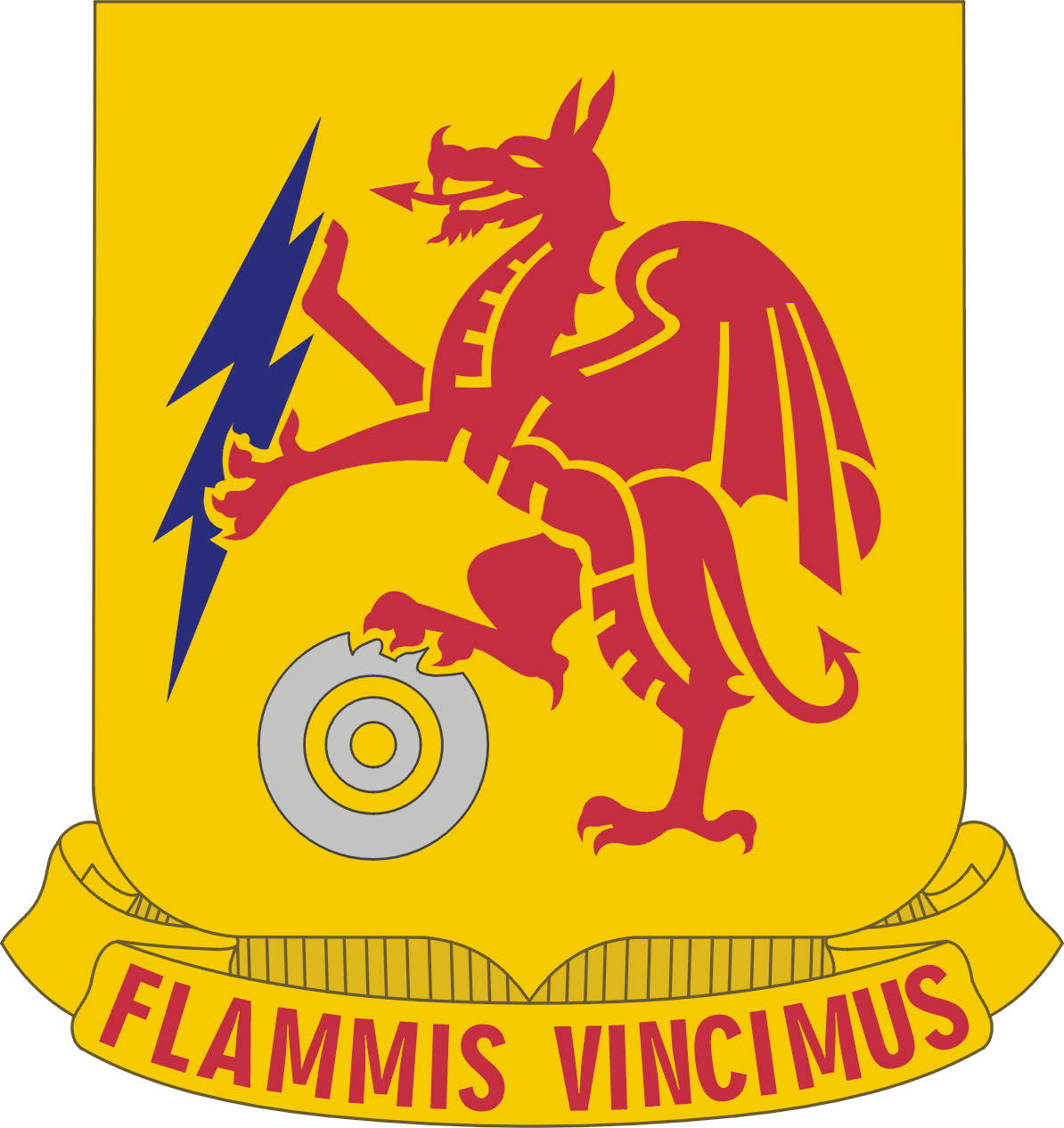
  - 2nd Chemical Battalion, Fort Hood (TX)
    - Headquarters and Headquarters Company, Fort Hood (TX)
    - 63rd Chemical Company, Fort Campbell (KY)
    - 172nd Chemical Company, Fort Riley (KS)
    - 181st Chemical Company, Fort Hood (TX)
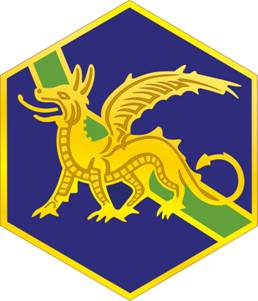
  - 22nd Chemical Battalion, Fort Bliss (TX)
    - Headquarters and Headquarters Company, Fort Bliss (TX)
    - 10th Chemical Company, Fort Carson (CO)
    - 44th Chemical Company, Fort Bliss (TX)
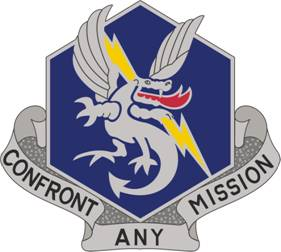
  - 83rd Chemical Battalion, Fort Stewart (GA)
    - Headquarters and Headquarters Company, Fort Stewart (GA)
    - 21st Chemical Company, Fort Bragg (NC)
    - 25th Chemical Company (Tech Escort), Fort Stewart (GA)
    - 51st Chemical Company, Fort Stewart (GA)
    - 59th Chemical Company, Fort Drum (NY)
    - 92nd Chemical Company, Fort Stewart (GA)
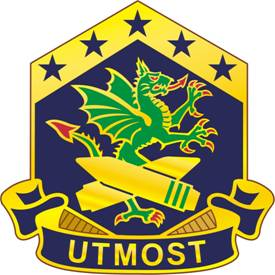
  - 110th Chemical Battalion, Joint Base Lewis–McChord (WA)
    - Headquarters and Headquarters Company, Joint Base Lewis–McChord (WA)
    - 9th Chemical Company (Tech Escort), Joint Base Lewis–McChord (WA)
    - 11th Chemical Company (Tech Escort), Joint Base Lewis–McChord (WA)
    - 45th Chemical Company, Joint Base Lewis–McChord (WA)

The 83rd Chemical Battalion was formerly the 83rd Chemical Mortar Battalion, which fought with the 1st, 3rd, and 4th Ranger Battalions in North Africa, Sicily, and Italy until those three battalions were destroyed during Operation Shingle. They were part of the 6615th Ranger Force which also included the 509th Parachute Infantry Battalion. The lineage of the 2nd Chemical Battalion (CBRN) goes back to the 30th Engineer Regiment (Gas and Flame), formed in 1917. The battalion and its predecessor units fought in World War I, World War II, the Korean War, Operation Desert Storm, and Operation Iraqi Freedom.

== Commanders ==
- Colonel Vance P. (Phil) Visser (2007–2009)
- Colonel Eric Brigham (2009–2011)
- Colonel Maria Zumwalt (2011–2013)
- Colonel Sven Erichsen (2013–2015)
- Colonel Christopher Cox (2015–2017)
- Colonel Christopher Hoffman (2017–2019)
- Colonel W Maria Bochat (2019–2021)
- Colonel Alexander C. Lovasz (2021–2023)
- Colonel Johannie San Miguel (2023–2025)
- Colonel Jacy Park (2025–present)

== Command Sergeants Major ==
- CSM Donald Moten (2007–2011)
- CSM Kenneth M. Graham (2011–2013)
- CSM Kendall Owens (2013–2015)
- CSM Christopher Williams (2015–2017)
- CSM Ronrico Hayes (2017–2020)
- CSM William F. Allen III (2020–2022)
- CSM Chesley L. Baird, Jr (2022-2023)
- CSM Chylander S. Cummings (2023-Present)
