= Kevin R. Wendel =

United States Army general (born 1957)

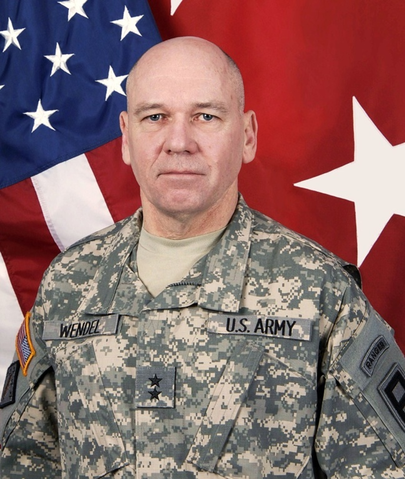
- Wendel as commander of First Army Division East and interim commander of First United States Army, 2013
- Born: 1957 (age 68–69); Bridgewater Township, New Jersey
- Military career
- Allegiance: United States
- Branch: United States Army
- Service years: 1977–2014
- Rank: Major General
- Commands: Combined Security Transition Command – Afghanistan; First United States Army; First Army Division East; 20th Chemical, Biological, Radiological, Nuclear and high-yield Explosives Command; 3rd Brigade, 1st Cavalry Division
- Conflicts: War in Afghanistan
- Awards: Army Distinguished Service Medal (2)

Kevin R. Wendel (born 1957) is a retired officer of the United States Army. He attained the rank of major general, and his assignments included interim commander of First United States Army, commander of First Army Division East, commander of the 20th Chemical, Biological, Radiological, Nuclear and high-yield Explosives Command at Aberdeen Proving Ground, Maryland, and commander of 3rd Brigade, 1st Cavalry Division.

== Early life and education ==
Kevin Robert Wendel was born in Bridgewater Township, New Jersey circa 1957, the son of Fred W. Wendel and Marie Elizabeth (Burns) Wendel. In 1975, he graduated from Bridgewater-Raritan High School West in Bridgewater, New Jersey. Wendel graduated from Valley Forge Military Academy and College with an associate degree in 1977 and received his commission as a second lieutenant via Early Commissioning Program. He graduated from Furman University with a bachelor's degree in business administration and completed the last two years of his Reserve Officers' Training Corps training there as an Infantry officer.

== Military career ==
=== Field rank ===
After completing the Infantry Officer Basic Course, Wendel served in a variety of command and staff positions in the United States, as well as completing assignments in South America, Europe and Southwest Asia. He graduated from the Infantry Officer Advanced Course in 1983, after which he commanded Company D, 4th Battalion, 187th Infantry, 101st Airborne Division, followed by command of Headquarters and Headquarters Company, 3rd Brigade, 101st Division.

Wendel graduated from the United States Army Command and General Staff College in 1991, after which he held a variety of field grade officer staff positions, and commanded 1st Battalion, 327th Infantry Regiment. He subsequently graduated from the United States Army War College, after which he served as special assistant to the commanding general of the 1st Cavalry Division at Fort Hood, Texas. Wendel holds a master's degree in public administration from Shippensburg University of Pennsylvania, and earned a master's degree in Strategic Studies and Theory from the Army War College.

=== 20th Chemical, Biological, Radiological, Nuclear and high-yield Explosives Command ===
From 2000 to 2003, Wendel commanded 3rd Brigade, 1st Cavalry Division. In August 2003, he was assigned as chief of the strategy division in the Strategic Plans and Policy Directorate (J-5) on the Joint Staff at The Pentagon. From 2004 to 2005, Wendel was assigned as assistant deputy director for Strategy and Policy (J-5) on the Joint Staff.

Wendel served as commander of the 20th Chemical, Biological, Radiological, Nuclear and high-yield Explosives Command (CBRNE) (originally called the 20th Support Command) at Aberdeen Proving Ground, Maryland from 2005 to 2008. His subsequent assignments included director of operational maneuver for United States Army Central in Kuwait, and deputy director of Operations for United States Africa Command.

=== General officer ===
From 2011 to 2013, Wendel was commander of First Army Division East; during 2013, he was interim commander of First United States Army following the departure of John Michael Bednarek to serve as Chief of the Office of Security Cooperation (OSC) in Iraq, and prior to the arrival of Michael S. Tucker to assume command of First Army.

After leaving First Army, Wendel was assigned as commander of Combined Security Transition Command – Afghanistan (CSTC–A)/Ministerial Advisory Groups and Commander of North Atlantic Treaty Organization Training Mission – Afghanistan. Wendel's first deputy commander with (CSTC–A) was Harold J. Greene, who was killed in action in August 2014. Wendel completed this assignment in October 2014, and was succeeded by Todd T. Semonite.

== Awards ==
Wendel received the Army Distinguished Service Medal for his accomplishments while in command of the 20th CBRNE Command, and again for his success while in command of First Army Division East and First United States Army.

== Family ==
Wendel is the husband of Denise Jane Kaiser of Bridgewater, New Jersey. They graduated from high school together, and were married in 1979.

Kevin Wendel is one of four sons born to Fred and Marie Wendel; his brothers include Jeffrey, a retired commander in the United States Navy, Dale, and Greg, also a retired Navy commander.

== Sources ==
=== Internet ===
- Rhodes, Lisa R. (April 1, 2011). "Division commander settles into new job". www.army.mil/. Washington, DC.
- Glenn, Amanda C. (August 27, 2013). "Division East changes commander but not mission focus". www.army.mil/. Washington, DC.
- "Obituary, John Howard Kaiser". Star-Ledger. Newark, NJ. December 29, 2013.
- Sopko, John F. (February 19, 2014). "Letter from the Special Inspector General for Afghanistan Reconstruction" (PDF). Washington, DC: United States Department of Defense. p. 1. Archived from the original (PDF) on December 23, 2016.
- Martinez, Michael; Shoichet, Catherine E.; Sciutto, Jim (August 6, 2014). "Maj. Gen. Harold Greene, Army officer since 1980, is killed in Afghanistan". CNN.com. Atlanta, GA.
- Fallon, Michael J. (October 4, 2014). "CSTC-A welcomes new commander" (PDF). The Engineer Blast. Washington, DC: Office of the Army Chief of Engineers. p. 1. Archived from the original (PDF) on October 20, 2016.

=== Newspapers ===
- "BRHS-W grads awarded diplomas". The Courier-News. Bridgewater, NJ. June 23, 1975. p. 12.
- "School Briefs: Kevin Wendel". The Courier-News. Bridgewater, NJ. June 28, 1977. p. 4. "Kevin Wendel of Bridgewater was awarded a teo-year Army R.O.T.C. scholarship recently. He will attend Furman University, Greenville, S.C."
- "Wedding Announcement, Wendel-Kaiser". The Courier-News. Bridgewater, NJ. December 19, 1979. p. 26.
- Johnson, Yvonne (July 17, 2008). "Snow assumes command of FORSCOM's 20th SUPCOM" (PDF). APG News. Aberdeen Proving Ground, MD. p. 1. Archived from the original (PDF) on October 25, 2016.
- "Obituary, Marie Elizabeth Wendel". Star-Ledger. Newark, NJ. May 30, 2014.

=== Books ===
- Military Readiness Subcommittee, United States House of Representatives Armed Services Committee (1999). Hearings on National Defense Authorization Act for Fiscal Year 1999. Washington, DC: US Government Printing Office. p. 227. ISBN 9780160579165.
