= 2nd Chemical Battalion =

US Army unit

2D Chemical Battalion
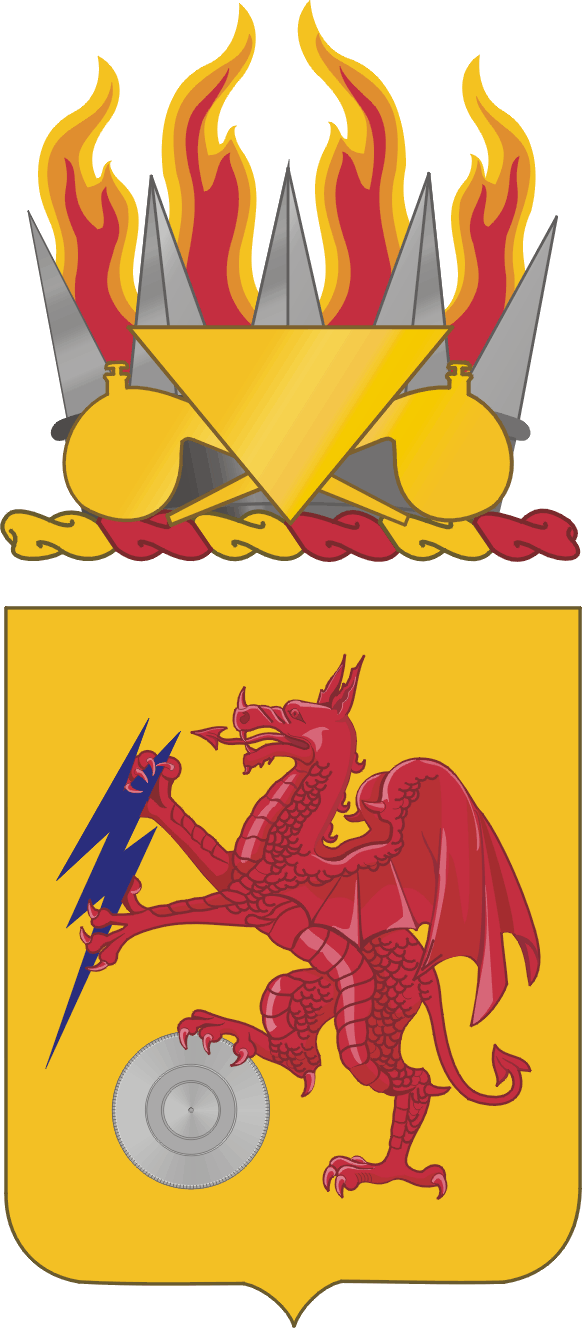
- Coat of Arms
- Active: 1917–1919; 1929; 1942–1946; 1949–1955; 1958–1973; 1981–present
- Country: United States
- Branch: U.S. Army
- Type: Chemical
- Role: smoke generation (deactivated), mass casualty decontamination, hazardous materials response, and CBRN reconnaissance
- Garrison/HQ: Fort Hood, Texas
- Nicknames: Red Dragons “Hell Fire Boys” (1st Gas Rgt)
- Motto: Second to None!
- Equipment: 4 inch Stokes Mortar
- Engagements: Aisne-Marne, St. Mihiel, Meuse-Argonne Offensive

Commanders
- Current commander: Lieutenant Colonel Theodore Demaria
- Command Sergeant Major: Command Sergeant Major

Insignia
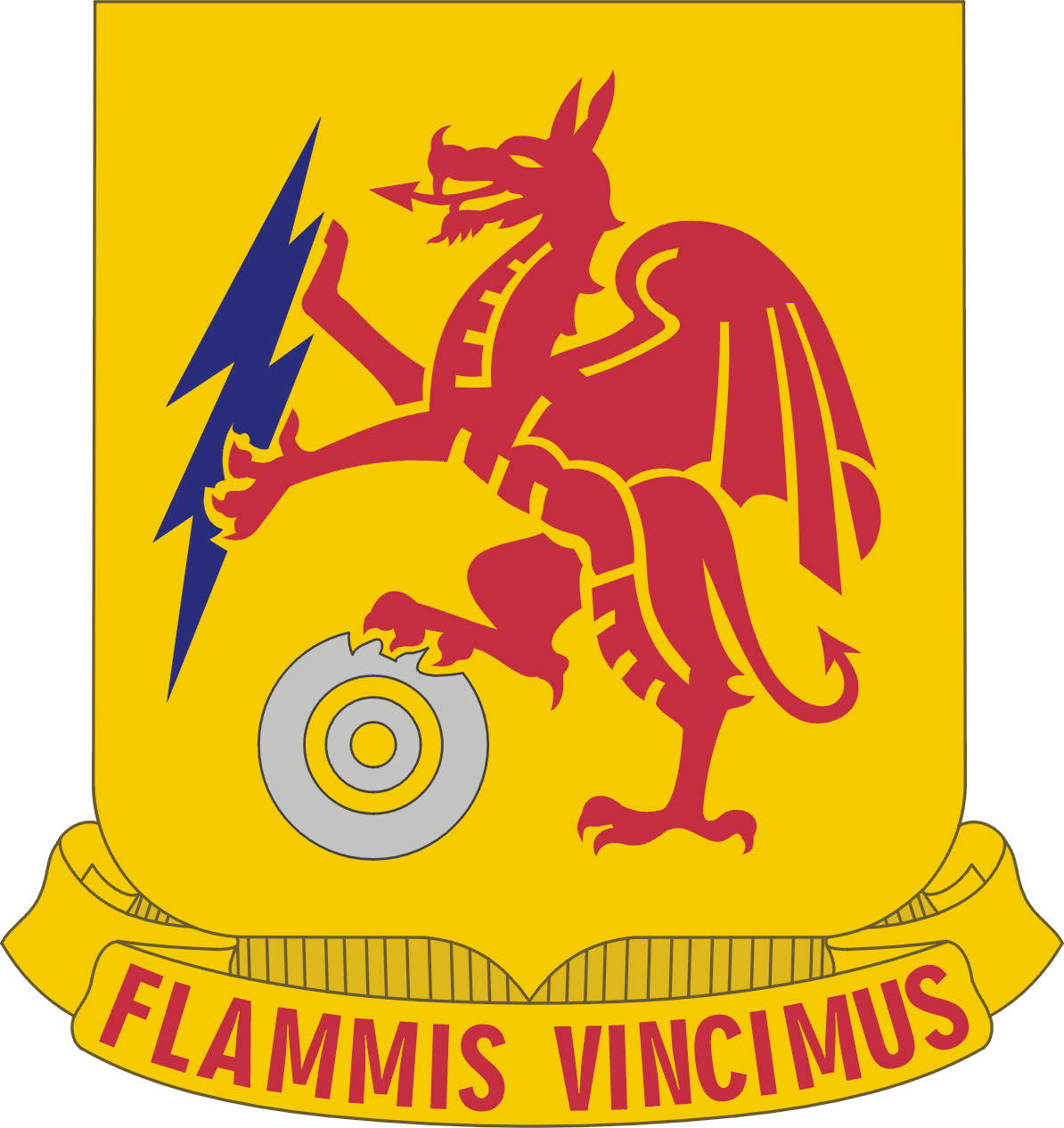
- Distinctive unit insignia

The 2nd Chemical Battalion is a United States Army chemical unit stationed at Fort Hood, Texas, United States, and is part of the 48th Chemical Brigade. The battalion can trace its lineage from the 30th Engineer Regiment (Gas and Flame) and has served in World War I, World War II, Korean War, Operation Desert Storm, and Operation Iraqi Freedom.

The 2nd Chemical Battalion currently (June 2019) consists of the Headquarters and Headquarters Company (Hellfire) and 181st Chemical Company (Double Dragons) at Fort Hood (then known as Fort Cavazos), Texas, the 172nd Chemical Company (Gladiators) at Fort Riley, Kansas and the 63rd Chemical Company (Dragon Masters) at Fort Campbell, Kentucky/Tennessee. The 68th Chemical Company (Responders) was formerly part of the battalion but was deactivated on September 27, 2024 at Fort Hood. The unit is sometimes incorrectly referred to as the "2D CBRN Battalion" where CBRN stands for Chemical, Biological, Radiological, and Nuclear. However the correct designation for the unit is "2D Chemical Battalion (CBRN)."

== History ==
=== Formation ===
Shortly after the U.S. entered World War I, the general staff of the American Expeditionary Forces (AEF) decided to establish a Gas Service, part of which would be an offensive gas regiment. Born out of this decision was War Department General Order 108, dated 15 August 1917, which authorized and established an offensive gas unit designated as the 30th Engineer Regiment (Gas and Flame.) Shortly thereafter, General Order 31 from the General Headquarters of the AEF officially activated the Gas Service Section with Colonel Amos Fries in command. Because its lineage traces directly back to the 30th Engineers, this timeline means that not only is the 2D Chemical Battalion the first and oldest unit in the Chemical Corps, but it is also older than the Chemical Corps itself.

On 30 August 1917 Captain Earl J. Atkisson was assigned the task of raising and training the fledgling gas regiment which was stationed at Camp American University, Washington, D.C. Atkisson set out acquiring officers, enlisted men, equipment and information. Beginning on 19 October 1917, the influx of enlisted personnel into the regiment was "near continuous".

Early on the 30th Engineer Regiment became known as the "Hell Fire Battalion", and its soldiers as the "Hell Fire Boys". A 15 November 1917 story in the Baltimore Evening Star stated:

If His Satanic Majesty happened to drop around at the American University training camp to-day, he would see the "Hell Fire Battalion" at work and might blush with envy. On the War Department records the battalion is known as the "Gas and Flame Battalion of the Thirtieth Regiment Engineers." Throughout the Army they are known as the "Hell Fire Boys."

In reality training consisted mostly of close order drill, marching, inspections and guard duty. The U.S. Army had no men with chemical warfare experience, no weapons or agents to train for offensive chemical warfare, and no gas masks or other protection to train for defensive chemical warfare. On 24 December 1917, the first two companies of the regiment deployed to France as part of the American Expeditionary Force (AEF), still with no equipment or training for chemical warfare.

=== World War I ===
Once in France, companies A and B reported to the British Special (Chemical) Brigade and received training in offensive chemical warfare with Livens projectors and Stokes mortars. Five platoons completed a five-week training course and began offensive operations under supervision of the Special Brigade on 2 March, only 93 days after formal organization. During this period the 30th Engineers participated in the largest gas attack of the war, consisting of 4,000 Livens projectors. On 22 May 1918, the regiment began combat operations as an independent American unit. The 30th Engineers won three campaign streamers – Flanders 1918, Lys, and Lorraine 1918 which are still carried on the battalion colors today.

On 13 July 1918 the regiment was re-designated as the 1st Gas Regiment. In its first campaign (Aisne-Marne) the front was very fluid. Gas weapons were considered static and of little use when positions were changing frequently. Therefore, the regiment was assigned to road repairs and the men performed this task with such excellence that they were praised by the I Corps Commanding General for “maintaining practically the entire line of communication upon which the advancing Divisions were dependent” which was “of first importance” to the success of the campaign. Meanwhile, officers and picked weapon squads demonstrated to American combat commanders the effectiveness of their gas weaponry. This began a tradition still demonstrated by the Red Dragons today: gaining trust and confidence by excelling at onerous, off-mission work, and using persuasion and education to ensure their chemical capabilities are used most effectively.

For their second campaign (St. Mihiel) they were assigned all along the American front, supporting eight infantry divisions. Confounding the view that gas weapons were static, members of the regiment began carrying their Stokes mortars along with the advancing infantry to assist by taking out enemy machine gun positions and other strong points. At times their heavy 4-inch gas mortars were in action ahead of the infantry's own 3-inch mortars, firing combinations of gas, smoke, and thermite.

The 1st Gas Regiment won battle streamers for Aisne-Marne, St. Mihiel, and the Meuse-Argonne. During six campaigns seventy-five members of the regiment made the ultimate sacrifice while supporting the AEF. After the Armistice, the regiment redeployed to Camp Kendrick, Lakehurst, New Jersey where it was demobilized on 28 February 1919.

=== Between the Wars ===
On 24 February 1920 the 1st Gas Regiment was reconstituted at Edgewood Arsenal, Maryland which remained its home station until 1953. Duties at Edgewood were mostly routine for more than a decade. The men maintained the grounds, polished their equipment, and drilled. They conducted demonstrations with Stokes mortars and Livens projectors and taught the Chemical Warfare Course for all Army officers. Being trained with tear gas, their responsibilities included crowd control and periodic field exercises were conducted to practice this mission as well as combat operations.

On 5 February 1929 the 1st Gas Regiment was redesignated the 1st Chemical Regiment. The men in ranks hardly noticed, as the idyllic environment at Edgewood continued unchanged. The daily schedule of events was standard, with weekends free after Saturday morning inspections.

Change was more noticeable after 15 April 1935 when the 1st Chemical Regiment was disbanded. The next day the 2nd Separate Chemical Battalion was activated, receiving all personnel and equipment from the disbanded regiment. With supplies and equipment in short supply, soldiers began to refer to the new unit as the “2nd Desperate Chemical Battalion.” The battalion began training with the new 4.2-inch chemical mortar, developed from the 4-inch Stokes mortar. The new weapon had a rifled barrel that give it unprecedented accuracy, and a firm base structure that allowed firing up to 20 rounds per minute. With a 25-pound shell a company of mortars had the firepower (although not the range) of a full battalion of 105 mm howitzers.

=== World War II ===
After Pearl Harbor the battalion spent several months performing guard duty at aircraft manufacturing plants, public water supplies and other potentially sensitive points. Then it was transferred to Fort Bragg, NC under a new commander, Major Robert W. Breaks. On 1 April 1942 Companies B, C, and D and a Medical Detachment were activated. For 14 months Breaks carried out a training program that involved working with paratroopers and engineers, extensive mountain training, and four amphibious invasion exercises. Most important, they trained with the 45th Infantry Division, with which they invaded Sicily in Operation HUSKY, and which they supported on many occasions during the war.

During the Sicilian campaign, 10 July – 18 August 1943, operating under the code name SAPPHIRE, the Red Dragons were the only Allied unit to serve the entire 38-day campaign without relief. Their performance in supporting infantry attacks was so remarkable that shortly after the invasion of Italy, Fifth Army ordered that no infantry division would ever go into combat without a chemical mortar battalion attached, and no infantry regiment without a chemical mortar company attached. Eventually 32 chemical mortar battalions were activated and in 1947 the 4.2-inch mortar was standardized by Ordnance and was the primary heavy support weapon for fifty years. These decisions rested heavily on the mortar's performance in the hands of the 2nd Separate Chemical Battalion.

The battalion was cited specifically for its actions on 6 August 1943 at San Fratello Ridge, known as “Hill 715.” Two battalions of the 15th Infantry became trapped while attacking across the Furiano River. The Red Dragons laid an eight-hour smoke screen on a 3500-yard front to protect the infantry which was under direct observation and fire from the ridge. Two chemical mortar companies were shelled out of their positions but set up elsewhere and continued firing. That night the two infantry battalions returned safely under cover of darkness.

On 7 September 1943 the unit was re-designated the 2nd Chemical Battalion, Motorized being one of the few Army units with enough organic transport to move itself unassisted. Under this name the battalion participated in the invasion of Italy at Salerno (Operation AVALANCHE.) The 45th, 34th and 3rd Infantry Divisions went into the line and were rotated out, but the Red Dragons remained in action to support each in turn. The unit participated in the Naples-Foggia and Rome-Arno campaigns, then prepared for the invasion of southern France in operation ANVIL-DRAGOON, Company A joined the First Airborne Task in a glider assault 15 miles inland from the beaches. The battalion continued with the ABTF defending against any German penetration of the French-Italian border in the Maritime Alps. They then proceeded to the Vosges Mountains, attached to the First French Army. At this point they had completed the Southern France campaign. On 31 December 1944 the designation changed to 2nd Chemical Mortar Battalion.

Continuing on to cross the Rhine and enter Germany, the battalion completed the Rhineland, Ardennes Alsace, and Germany campaigns. Significant events included defending the flank of 3rd Army during the Battle of the Bulge, assault on the Maginot line, liberation of the Dachau concentration camp, and the capture of a town named Traunstein. This was the only occasion in the entire war in which a chemical mortar battalion was credited with such a capture. In Traunstein HQ Company captured a young Luftwaffe deserter named Joseph Ratzinger, who later would become Pope Benedict XVI.

After the German surrender, the battalion was assigned guard duty over numerous sites where the Germans had stored chemical munitions, including Zyklon B, the chemical used for mass executions in the concentration camps. On 26 July 1946 the battalion was deactivated in Germany, with remaining personnel going to the 9th Infantry Division. During the war the battalion was in combat for 511 days, the same as the 45th Division, and the second most days of combat in the US Army in the European Theatre of Operations. Fifty-eight men were killed in action.

=== Korean War ===
The 2nd Chemical Mortar Battalion was reactivated at Edgewood Arsenal on 1 February 1949. Personnel and equipment came from the 91st Chemical Mortar Battalion. For the next year and a half, the Red Dragons trained to a high state of readiness under the command of Lieutenant Colonel V. H. Bell. The battalion taught the Chemical Warfare School for the entire Army. They trained Army and National Guard troops on use of the 4.2-inch mortar. They conducted PORTEX, a practice invasion of Puerto Rico, and trained on airborne operations with the mortar.

The Korean War broke out on July 25, 1950. The battalion received movement orders on 7 September 1950 and moved so quickly that 47 days later, on 24 October, they fired their first combat mission. The journey. included travelling 700 miles up the Korean peninsula in four days, from Pusan South Korea to YongByon, North Korea. They were assigned the code name NATIVE and kept it for the rest of the war. A week later the battalion was over run at Unsan when the Chinese made their first significant entry into the war. Many guns and vehicles were lost and 19 men were killed, some by capture and execution. On 26 November the Chinese made a major assault against the US 9th Infantry, which the Red Dragons were supporting. The Chinese over ran most of the battalion's gun positions, and men continued to fire missions for the infantry while under small arms fire. Six men were killed; two were awarded posthumous Silver Stars.

As the entire Eighth Army retreated, 2nd Chemical was attached to the 27th British Commonwealth Brigade. Working together smoothly these two units formed the rear guard as all of Eighth Army retreated more than 400 miles. They were the only units in contact with the enemy, constantly setting ambushes and falling back. The association of these two units continued for almost six months, and after the war the 27th gave the Red Dragons a set of ceremonial drums like the one they used on parade, which rest today in battalion HQ at Fort Hood. On 14 February 1951, the Red dragons, still with the 27th Commonwealth Brigade, played a critical role in saving the US 23rd Infantry which was surrounded at Chipyong-ni by 90,000 Chinese troops.

When the United Nations advanced again in the spring of 1951 the battalion was moved literally from coast to coast. Their presidential citation for this period reads in part, “...the men of this Battalion moved along the entire width of the battle-line, emplacing where the fighting was heaviest, inflicting tremendous casualties among attackers, and redeploying as soon as a relative lull occurred to yet another sector where the savage battle flared anew.” This was one of four citations that the battalion earned during the war. The Red Dragons were the only chemical mortar battalion to serve in the war, and routinely outperformed heavy mortar units of the infantry, although operating with much lower manpower. The unit remained in combat for 1007 days, never relieved or placed in reserve. It participated in eight of the ten United Nations campaigns of the war. Sixty-one members of the battalion were killed or missing in action.

On 23 January 1953 all personnel and equipment of the 2nd Chemical Mortar Battalion were transferred to the 461st Infantry Battalion (Heavy Mortar). The Red Dragon personnel, serving as the 461st Infantry Battalion, continued in action until the Armistice, completing their ninth campaign, the tenth and last campaign of the war. The 461st was over run twice in June and July 1953. Ironically, those who served in the 461st were eligible for the Combat Infantryman's Badge after their transfer to the new unit.

=== Cold War ===
The 2nd Chemical Mortar Battalion was transferred at zero strength to the U.S. and re-designated the 2nd Chemical Weapons Battalion. Personnel were transferred from the 3rd Chemical Weapons Battalion which was deactivated. The battalion trained with 5.5-inch chemical rockets at Dugway Proving grounds until 16 January 1955 when it was deactivated. On 7 January 1958 Headquarters and Headquarters Company was reactivated at Fort McClellan, Alabama as the 2nd Chemical Battalion (Smoke Generator.) Companies A, B, and C, still at Dugway were inactivated at the same time. For the first time in its 40-year history, the Red Dragons became a service unit rather than a combat unit. Smoke operations continued until the unit was deactivated 19 December 1973 at Fort McClellan Alabama. It was reactivated on 1 September 1981 as the 2d Chemical Battalion, stationed at Fort Hood, Texas.

At this point the companies were no longer lettered, but had their own numbers and could be moved from battalion to battalion in the Chemical Corps. Initially the battalion consisted only of Headquarters and the 181st Chemical Detachment. The 181st was later expanded to a company and has remained part of the Red Dragons to the present day. There is not a record of which companies were in the battalion at any point in time, until Desert Storm. With various numbered companies, the battalion continued to function through the next twenty years with at least one smoke company, a decontamination company, a chemical reconnaissance company, and at times a BIDS (Biological Integrated Detection System.)

The 13th Chemical Company was activated with 2nd Chemical in 2001 as the Army's first BIDS unit. It operated at first using a Humvee platform and later a specialized vehicle based on the M-113 personnel carrier. The deactivation of the 13th in 2011 ended the battalion's BIDS mission. Decontamination in the 1970s was carried out with the M12 skid-mounted decontamination system that was standardized in 1961. This was replaced beginning in 1987 by the M17, lighter but with higher capacity. During the 1980s the battalion discontinued the M3 stationary smoke generators that had been in use since 1952. M3 generators were mounted on Humvee platforms under the name M56 Coyote, and on M-1059 vehicles based on M-113 personnel carriers and known as Lynx. The Red Dragons tested and deployed the Army's first M-1059s in the mid-1980s. The M58 Wolf, also based on the M113, was introduced in 1998 but never fully replaced the M1059.The Red Dragons used M-1059s in Desert Storm and Operation Iraqi Freedom until the last ones were retired in 2005. After this the battalion mission set no longer included smoke.

=== Operation Desert Storm ===
In August 1990, Iraq attacked Kuwait and seized the oil fields and the capital, Kuwait City. The 2d Chemical Battalion received deployment orders from Fort Hood, Texas, and by 27 October 1990 the battalion had closed into Saudi Arabia and was attached to the XVIII Airborne Corps for the Defense of Saudi Arabia during Operation Desert Shield. On 10 January 1991 the battalion was attached to the Army VII Corps (designated the main force for the attack into Iraq), The VII Corps would eventually total approximately 145,000 Soldiers, and consist of four Armor divisions (one being the UK 1st Armor Division), one Mechanized Infantry Division and the 2d Armored Cavalry Regiment. The Red Dragons provided all chemical support to this formation, other than organic chemical units. When the ground war began on 24 February 1991 the battalion's operating chemical companies were the 46th and 84th, both smoke companies, the 181st, equipped for decontamination, the 323rd, a reserve unit, and the 12th Chemical Maintenance Company. The smoke companies lived in their tracks in the desert for five months. The total strength and equipment was 590 soldiers, 154 wheeled vehicles, 53 M-1059 tracked smoke generator vehicles, and 111 trailers. Headquarters and the 46th Chemical Company (Smoke Dawgs) were part of the VII Corps race across the desert in the “100-Hour War,” travelling 375 kilometers (233 miles.) Initially the Red Dragons were attached to the 1st Infantry which had the main attack, then the main attack was transferred to the 3rd Armored. At night the Red Dragons detached from the 1st ID which was in motion and in contact with the enemy, traveled 70 miles (113 kilometers) across unmarked desert to attach to the 3rd AD which was also in motion and in contact. On the way they went through acres of unexploded sub-munitions from American field artillery missions. This feat of land navigation was accomplished without GPS, because the XVIII Airborne had taken them. When hostilities ceased on 28 February, the battalion took up position in Kuwait for maintenance/recovery operations and supporting VII Corps in humanitarian assistance. On 7 May the battalion departed from Dhahran Airbase to return to Fort Hood, TX.

=== 1992-2002 ===
Throughout the 1990s the 2d Chemical Battalion remained stationed at Fort Hood, ready on order to deploy and take command and control of chemical units in any theater of operations. During this period the battalion participated heavily in development of the M93 Fox NBCRS (Nuclear Biological and Chemical Reconnaissance System) based on the German TPz Fuchs. The battalion was the first to deploy with Foxes, for chemical reconnaissance missions in Desert Storm. Beginning in 1998 it also tested the upgraded M93A1 Variant proving as viable new automated systems for sampling, analysis and reporting and the first remote chemical sensing system, the Remote Sensing Chemical Agent Alarm (RSCAAL) A number of chemical companies rotated in and out of the battalion including the 21st, 44th, 46th 59th, 84th, 101st, and 172nd. The 181st Chemical Company did not rotate, but remained with the battalion.

=== Operation Iraqi Freedom to Present ===
There is no known written history of the Red Dragons’ participation in Operation Iraqi Freedom. Some facts are known by direct observation.

The battalion deployed for the initial invasion which began on 19 March 2003. The 44th and 46th Chemical companies advanced with the 4th Infantry Division for provide smoke for river crossings. Several platoons deployed with Foxes. The first vehicle to enter Baghdad Airport was a Red Dragon Fox, to detect and identify chemical agents. A few isolated chemical munitions were identified, but the primary effort involved industrial chemical inventories. Large quantities of nitric acid posed particular problems. After the invasion, Red Dragon platoons were deployed to a variety of locations as far north as Tikrit. They were tasked for guard duty, infantry patrols, convoy escort, and other non-chemical duties. One platoon guarded a Tikrit bridge within a mile of Saddam Hussein's "Spider hole". Another platoon remained in Kuwait providing escort for visiting VIPs.

From 2004 to 2010 companies were almost constantly rotated on deployments. Further, individual soldiers were pulled from undeployed companies and inserted into both chemical and non-chemical units. The demand was high; soldiers meeting the criteria for deployment could be almost certain of individual deployment. During this period beginning in 1990 the M1135 Nuclear Biological Chemical Reconnaissance Vehicle (Stryker) system was deployed to replace the Fox. Some deployments in this period involved identification and assessment of “sensitive sites” which might contain chemical or valuable intelligence. The last company to deploy to Iraq was the 44th Chemical Company in 2010, which upon return went immediately into training with the M1135. In 2014 Red Dragons of the 181st Chemical Company retired the Army's last active Foxes at the National Training Center.

In 2007 the battalion became part of the 48th Chemical Brigade, an operational chemical brigade made up of four chemical battalions. The 48th in turn was subordinate to the 20th CBRNE command at the Edgewood Area of Aberdeen Proving Ground, formerly Edgewood Arsenal.

In 2012 the 2d Chemical Battalion took on the national Defense Chemical Response Force (DCRF) mission. Under this concept the battalion, in addition to readiness for overseas deployment, was tasked to respond to major CBRN (Chemical, Biological, Radiological and Nuclear) incidents in the US, whether of foreign or domestic origin. The battalion grew as large as 12 companies at four locations. Two years later the DCRF mission rotated to another chemical unit, and the battalion returned to it historical makeup of HHC and four operating companies.

As of this writing, July 2019, the Red Dragons continue to train to a high state of readiness for diverse missions. In 2018 Red Dragons provided humanitarian relief to the Houston area in the wake of Hurricane Harvey. In September of that year 42 soldiers deployed to San Jose Island Panama to demilitarize a collection of 500-pound phosgene bombs abandoned from a World War II storage facility. This mission was accomplished with no incidents or injuries of any sort.

== Campaign participation ==
- World War I: Flanders, Lys, Lorraine, Aisne-Marne, St. Mihiel, Meuse-Argonne
- World War II: Sicily (with arrowhead), Naples-Foggia (with arrowhead), Rome-Arno, Southern France (with arrowhead), Rhineland, Ardennes-Alsace, Central Europe
- Korean War: UN Offensive; CCF Intervention; First UN Counteroffensive; CCF Spring Offensive; UN Summer-Fall Offensive; Second Korean Winter; *Korea Summer Fall 1952; and Third Korean Winter campaigns.
- Southwest Asia: Defense of Saudi Arabia, Liberation and Defense of Kuwait, Ceasefire

== Unit commendations ==
- Presidential Unit Citation (Army), Streamer embroidered KUMHWA, KOREA
- Presidential Unit Citation (Navy), Streamer embroidered WONJU-HWACHON
- Navy Unit Commendation, Streamer embroidered PANMUNJOM
- Republic of Korea Presidential Unit Citation, Streamer embroidered DEFENSE OF KOREA
- Meritorious Unit Commendation (Army), Streamer embroidered Southwest Asia

== Current Configuration ==
- HHC, 2 CBRN Battalion (Fort Hood, TX)
- 21st Chemical Company (HR) (Fort Bragg, NC)
- 63rd Chemical Company (HR) (Fort Campbell, KY)
- 181st Chemical Company (HDR) (Fort Hood, TX)

== Traditions ==
The Distinctive Unit Insignia consists of a red dragon on gold background. The dragon clasps a blue lightning bolt symbolizing the unit's role as a combat unit from 1918 to 1958. The dragon's foot rests on a stylized wheel, representing the unit's 1940 status as a Motorized unit, rare in those days. A motorized unit had sufficient organic transport that it could move itself without vehicles from Quartermasters or other support units. The phrase “Flammis Vincimus” is Latin for “We conquer with Fire,” referring to the units use of dedicated offensive chemical weapons in World War I. It is the only unit in the US Army to have done so.

In 2002 a crest or coronet was added to the battalion colors, bearing four flames between five steel spikes. The four flames symbolize the four wars in which the battalion fought (Operation Iraqi Freedom had not yet occurred), and the five spikes represent five unit commendations that the unit has received.

The 30th Engineer Battalion was popularly known as “The Hellfire Boys.” In recognition of this, 2d Chemical Battalion Headquarters and Headquarters Company has the nickname “Hellfire.”

When the unit was a smoke generator battalion LTC Jack Stenger, a battalion commander who was a former mortar company commander was concerned that the men would forget their heritage. He procured a barrel from an M2A1 4.2-inch mortar and a custom was instituted in which four men would hold the barrel while another drank a suitable beverage from the muzzle. At the Red Dragon Centennial in 2017 this custom was revived as “The Fireshot Ceremony.” The name recalls that in a mortar position the platoon leader would order “Fire!” and as soon as the round was on its way, would say into the phone “Shot!” so that the Fire Direction Center could mark the exact time until impact.

The motto of the 2D Chemical Battalion (CBRN) is “Second to None.”

== Notable members ==
- During World War I, several Major League Baseball figures served in the 1st Gas Regiment (as it was then called). These included:
  - Branch Rickey, then general manager of the St. Louis Browns (later of the St. Louis Cardinals and Brooklyn Dodgers).
  - Ty Cobb, outfielder for the Detroit Tigers and one of the first five inductees into the Hall of Fame in 1936.
  - Christy Mathewson, pitcher for the New York Giants and one of the first five inductees into the Hall of Fame in 1936.
