= John Michael Bednarek =

United States Army officer

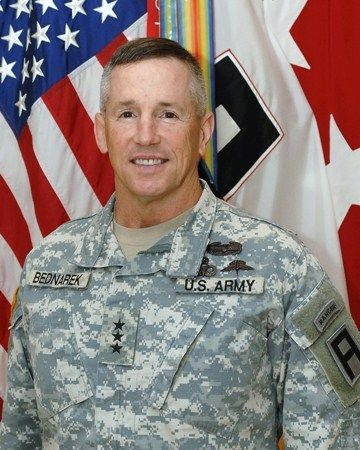
- Bednarek in 2011
- Born: London, United Kingdom
- Military career
- Allegiance: United States
- Branch: United States Army
- Service years: 1975–2015
- Rank: Lieutenant General
- Nickname: Mick
- Commands: Office of Security Cooperation-Iraq; United States First Army; 25th Infantry Division
- Conflicts: Iraq War
- Awards: Defense Distinguished Service Medal; Army Distinguished Service Medal; Defense Superior Service Medal; Legion of Merit (5)

John Michael "Mick" Bednarek is a retired United States Army officer. He was chief of the United States Office of Security Cooperation in Iraq and former commander of the United States First Army. Bednarek took command of the First Army on April 6, 2011, from Lieutenant General Thomas G. Miller and was succeeded as commanding officer by Major General Kevin R. Wendel on March 14, 2013 (interim), with Lieutenant General Michael S. Tucker succeeding Bednarek as permanent commander on August 2, 2013.

== Military career ==
Bednarek received his commission through an Army Reserve Officers' Training Corps program upon his graduation from Old Dominion University. He has held commands within every level of the Army, ranging from platoon to field army. Bednarek has also served as the Chief of the Training Group at the Joint Warfighting Center, the Chief of the Operations Group at the Joint Readiness Training Center, and Commander of the 4th Training Brigade. In June 2008 Bednarek was given command of the First Army's East Division and on April 6, 2011, Bednarek took command of the United States First Army. He served as commander of the First Army until March 14, 2013, when he was assigned as Chief of the Office of Security Cooperation (OSC) in Iraq. As OSC chief, Bednarek was the highest ranking American military officer in Iraq and was involved in US efforts against the Islamic State in the Iraqi Civil War. Bednarek has also attended Troy State University where he received a MS in personnel management and administration, the US Army Command and General Staff College, and the US Army War College. Bednarek retired from service on July 24, 2015.

== Awards and decorations ==
Combat Action Badge
Expert Infantryman Badge
Ranger tab
Master Parachutist Badge with one bronze Combat Jump Device
Military Freefall Parachutist Badge
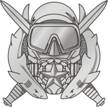
Special Operations Diving Supervisor Badge
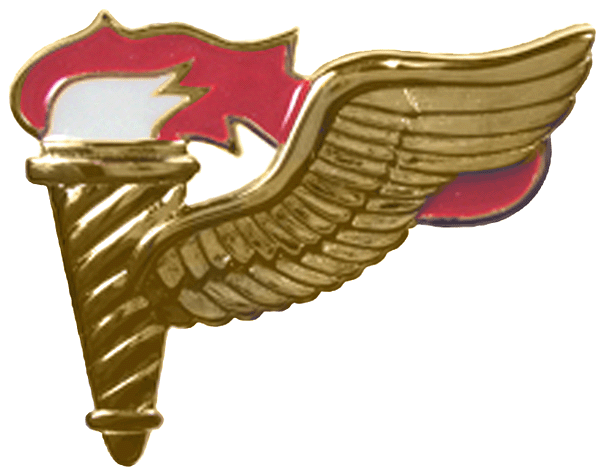
Pathfinder Badge
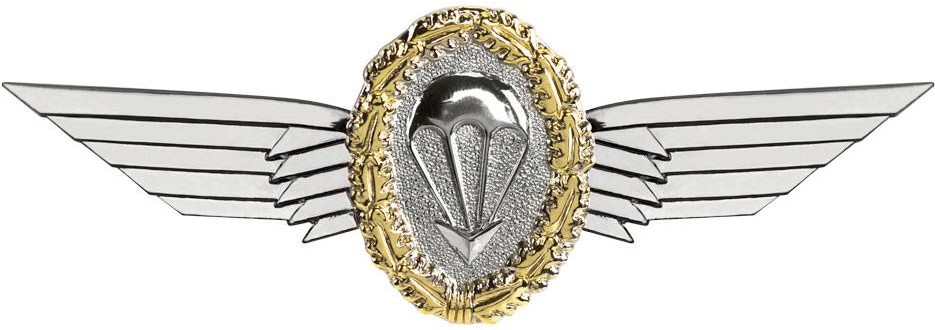
Silver German Parachutist Badge
25th Infantry Division Combat Service Identification Badge
75th Ranger Regiment Distinctive Unit Insignia

Defense Distinguished Service Medal
Army Distinguished Service Medal
Defense Superior Service Medal
Legion of Merit with four bronze oak leaf clusters
Defense Meritorious Service Medal
Meritorious Service Medal with silver oak leaf cluster
Army Commendation Medal with two oak leaf clusters
Army Achievement Medal
Joint Meritorious Unit Award with oak leaf cluster
Valorous Unit Award with oak leaf cluster
Meritorious Unit Commendation
Army Superior Unit Award with two oak leaf clusters
National Defense Service Medal with one bronze service star
Iraq Campaign Medal
Global War on Terrorism Service Medal
Humanitarian Service Medal
Army Service Ribbon
Army Overseas Service Ribbon with unidentified award numeral

Military offices
Preceded by Thomas G. Miller	Commanding General of the First United States Army; 2011–2013	Succeeded by Kevin R. Wendel (interim)
