= First Army Division East =

Division of the United States Army

- Shoulder sleeve insignia and combat service identification badge of the First United States Army
- Active: 7 March 2007 – 8 July 2026
- Country: United States
- Branch: United States Army
- Role: Training Support
- Size: Division
- Part of: First Army
- Garrison/HQ: Fort Knox, Kentucky
- Motto: Train for Combat

Commanders
- Current commander: MG Mark D. McCormack
- Command Sergeant Major: CSM Evan Lewandowski

Insignia
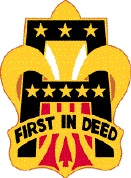
- Distinctive unit insignia

- Flag

First Army Division East was a division of the First United States Army. With its new role, the First Army developed two subordinate multi-component headquarters – one division to support the eastern United States and the other to support the western United States. First Army Division West was activated at Fort Carson, Colorado, and later moved to Fort Hood, Texas. First Army Division East was activated on 7 March 2007 at Fort George G. Meade, Maryland, and later moved to Fort Knox, Kentucky.

First Army Division East was established by Department of the Army Permanent Order 156-7 to provide training and readiness oversight and mobilization operations for an area of responsibility spanning 27 states and territories east of the Mississippi River. First Army Division East is responsible for mobilizing, training, readiness oversight and deploying the United States' Reserve and National Guard Soldiers, and selected Sailors and Airmen along with members of multiple interagency and governmental entities.

First Army Division East was deactivated 8 July 2026 at Rock Island Arsenal.

== Subordinate commands ==
The division is organized into five brigades located throughout the eastern United States with 52 total battalions.

4th "Saber" Cavalry Brigade – Fort Knox, Kentucky. Formerly the 85th Division's 4th Brigade.
157th "Spartan" Infantry Brigade – Camp Atterbury, Indiana. Formerly the 87th Division's 5th Brigade.
174th "Patriot" Infantry Brigade – Fort Dix (Joint Base McGuire-Dix-Lakehurst), New Jersey. Formerly the 78th Division's 2nd Brigade.
177th "Spear Head" Armored Brigade – Camp Shelby, Mississippi. Formerly the 87th Division's 3rd Brigade.
188th "Battle Ready" Infantry Brigade – Fort Stewart, Georgia. Formerly the 87th Division's 4th Brigade.

== Garrisons ==
Division East currently operates three mobilization training centers located at Camp Atterbury Joint Maneuver Training Center, Indiana; Camp Shelby Joint Forces Training Center, Mississippi; and the Fort Dix entity of Joint Base McGuire–Dix–Lakehurst, New Jersey.

== Commanders ==
- MG Jay W. Hood, 2006–2008
- BG Blake E. Williams, 2008 (interim)
- MG J. Michael Bednarek, 2008–2011
- MG Kevin R. Wendel, 2011–2013
- MG Jeffrey L. Bailey, 2013–2015
- MG Brian J. McKiernan, 2015–2016
- MG Todd B. McCaffrey, 2016–2018
- MG Terrence J. McKenrick, 2018–2020
- MG Mark H. Landes, 2020–2022
- MG Brian M. Howay, 2022–2024
- MG Michael J. Simmering, 2024–2025
- MG Mark D. McCormack, 2025-2026

== Decorations ==
Ribbon	Award	Year	Orders
	Army Meritorious Unit Commendation	Afghanistan Retrograde 2021–2022	Permanent Orders 032-0001 announcing award of the Army Meritorious Unit Commendation
	Army Superior Unit Award	2008–2011	Permanent Orders 332-07 announcing award of the Army Superior Unit award
