= James E. Bonner (general) =

United States Army general

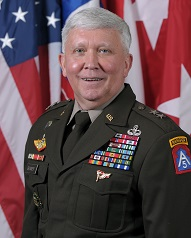
- Born: Anna, Illinois, U.S.
- Alma mater: Southern Illinois University; Army Command and General Staff College; Central Michigan University (MSA); Naval War College (MSA)
- Military career
- Allegiance: United States
- Branch: United States Army
- Service years: 1988–2024
- Rank: Major General
- Commands: Fort Leonard Wood/United States Maneuver Support Center of Excellence; 20th CBRNE Command; United States Army Chemical, Biological, Radiological, and Nuclear School; 3rd Chemical Brigade
- Conflicts: War in Afghanistan
- Awards: Legion of Merit (4); Bronze Star Medal

James E. Bonner is a United States Army major general who last served as the deputy commanding general of United States Army North from 2023 to 2024. He served as commanding general of the United States Army Maneuver Support Center of Excellence and Fort Leonard Wood from 2020 to 2023. He previously served as commanding general of the 20th Chemical, Biological, Radiological, Nuclear, Explosives Command and before that, as commandant of the United States Army Chemical, Biological, Radiological, and Nuclear School.

In November 2012, Bonner was inducted into the Southern Illinois University Army Reserve Officers' Training Corps Hall of Fame.

Military offices
Preceded by Maria R. Gervais	Commandant of the United States Army CBRN School and Chief of Chemical Corps; 2016–2017	Succeeded by Antonio Munera
Preceded by William E. King IV	Commanding General of the 20th CBRNE Command; 2017–2020	Succeeded by Antonio Munera
Preceded by Donna W. Martin	Commanding General of the United States Army Maneuver Support Center of Excellence; 2020–2023	Succeeded by Christopher G. Beck
Preceded by Robert F. Whittle Jr.	Deputy Commanding General of United States Army North; 2023–2024	Vacant
