= Mark D. McCormack =

US Army major general (born 1966)

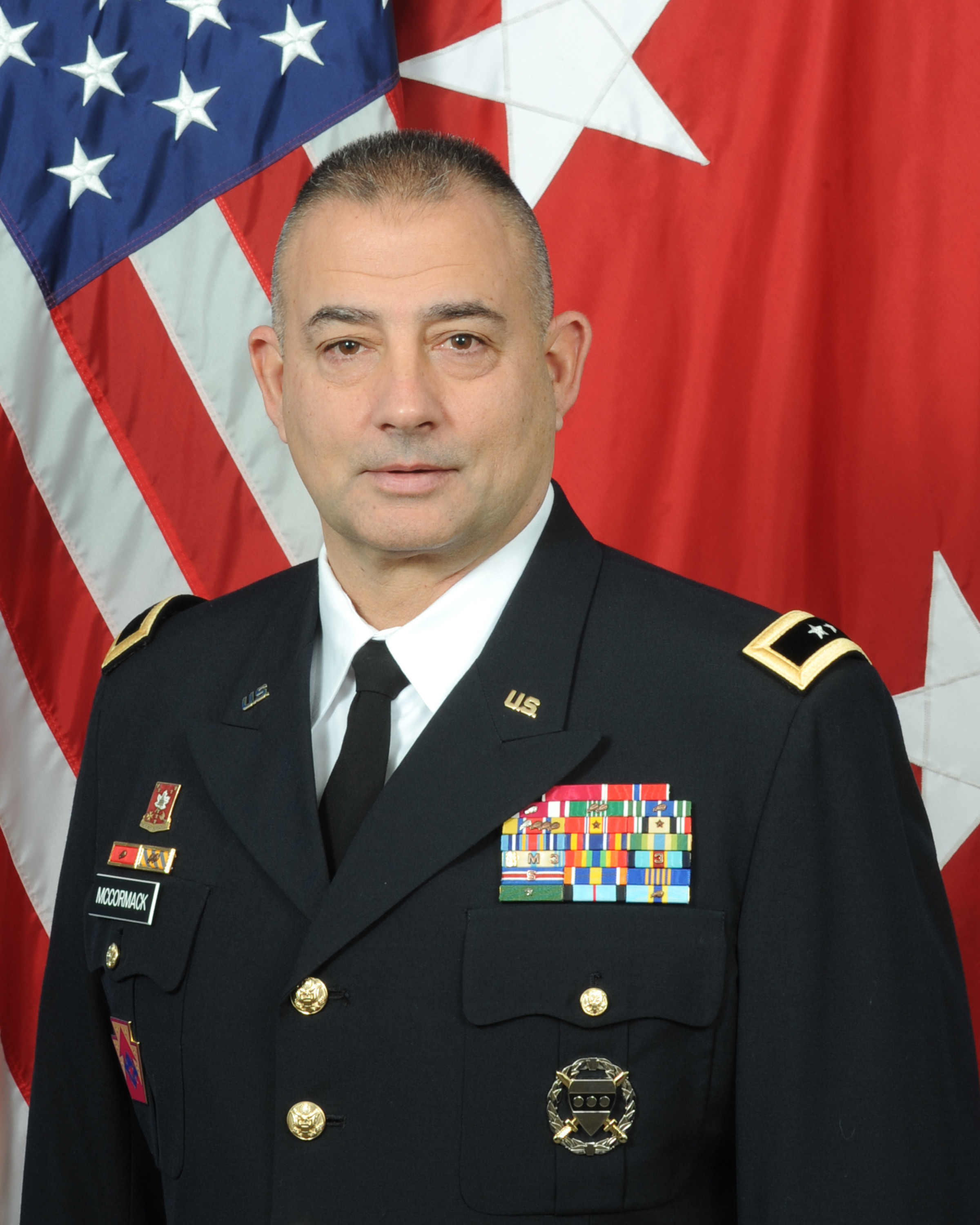
- McCormack as a major general in 2024
- Born: 1966 (age 59–60); Binghamton, New York, US
- Alma mater: Mansfield University; United States Army Command and General Staff College; United States Army War College
- Spouse: Lori E. McGinnis (m. 1993)
- Children: 2
- Military career
- Allegiance: United States of America
- Service: U.S. Army; U.S. Army Reserve; Pennsylvania Army National Guard
- Service years: 1988–2026
- Rank: Major General
- Units: Adjutant General’s Corps; Infantry Branch
- Commands: 281st Personnel Detachment; Detachment 1, 281st Personnel Detachment; 281st Personnel Services Detachment; 28th Personnel Support Battalion; 213th Regional Support Group; 28th Infantry Division; First Army Division East
- Conflicts: Operation Joint Endeavor; Iraq War; Operation Spartan Shield; Operation Inherent Resolve
- Awards: Army Distinguished Service Medal; Legion of Merit (2); Bronze Star Medal; Meritorious Service Medal (6)

Mark D. McCormack (born 1966) is a retired United States Army officer. A major general and veteran of the United States Army Reserve and Pennsylvania Army National Guard, from 2024 to 2026 he served as deputy commander of First United States Army at Rock Island, Illinois. McCormack's service included overseas assignments for Operation Joint Endeavor, the Iraq War, and Operation Spartan Shield. His awards and decorations included the Army Distinguished Service Medal, two awards of the Legion of Merit, the Bronze Star Medal, and six awards of the Meritorious Service Medal.

A native of Binghamton, New York, McCormack graduated from Mansfield University in 1989; while in college, he took part in the Reserve Officers' Training Corps. After receiving his commission as a second lieutenant, he served initially in the United States Army Reserve, and later transferred his military membership to the Pennsylvania Army National Guard. As he advanced through the ranks, he completed several command and staff assignments, and his commands included: 281st Personnel Detachment; Detachment 1, 281st Personnel Detachment; 281st Personnel Services Detachment, 28th Personnel Support Battalion, and 213th Regional Support Group. In May 2020, he was promoted to major general and assigned to command of the 28th Infantry Division. He completed this assignment in February 2024, and in July was assigned as deputy commander of First Army.

== Early life ==
Born in Binghamton, New York in 1966, a son of Michael A. McCormack and Angela (Carbo) McCormack. He was raised and educated in Binghamton, and graduated from Binghamton High School in 1984. In 1989, he completed a Bachelor of Arts degree in criminal justice administration at Mansfield University.

McCormack was assigned to the United States Army Reserve Control Group from May 1988 to January 1989, when he began attendance at the Infantry Officer Basic Course. After his basic course, he returned to the control group, where he remained until January 1990. From January 1990 to February 1991, he was executive officer of Company D, 3rd Battalion, 392nd Regiment, a training unit of the United States Army Reserve's 98th Training Division. From February 1991 to October 1992, McCormack was again assigned to the USAR Control Group. In the early 1990s, he moved first to Denver, Pennsylvania and later to Mechanicsburg, Pennsylvania, and he graduated from the state police academy's liquor law enforcement officers course in October 1992.

== Start of career ==
In October 1992, transferred his military membership to the Pennsylvania Army National Guard as a member of the 28th Adjutant General Company. In October 1993, he was appointed commander of the 281st Personnel Detachment. From February to October 1997, he commanded Detachment 1, 281st Personnel Detachment, which performed duty in Germany during Operation Joint Endeavor. From October 1997 to September 1998, McCormack commanded the 281st Personnel Services Company.

=== Military education ===
Professional education McCormack completed during his career includes:

- Adjutant General Officer Advanced Course
- United States Army Command and General Staff College
- United States Army War College (master of strategic studies degree)
- Dual Status Commanders Course
- Joint Domestic Operations Course
- Joint Task Force Commanders Course
- Senior Leaders' Course, Baltic Defence College
- Army Senior Leader Development Seminar (SLDS)
- Army Strategic Education Program - Command (ASEP-C)
- Aviation Senior Leader Course (AvSLC)
- National Security Studies Management Course (NSSMC), Syracuse University

== Continued career ==
From September 1998 to July 2001, McCormack served as personnel staff officer (S-1) on the staff of the 28th Infantry Division Support Command (DISCOM). From July 2001 to October 2004, he was assigned as personnel service officer on the staff of Pennsylvania's Joint Force Headquarters. He served as commander of the 28th Personnel Support Battalion from October 2004 to February 2007. From February 2007 to February 2010, McCormack served as deputy commander of the 213th Area Support Group, which included Operation Iraqi Freedom deployment to Balad from April 2007 to May 2008.

From February 2010 to November 2012, McCormack was assigned as assistant chief of staff for personnel (J-1) at Joint Force Headquarters – Pennsylvania. From November 2012 to October 2015, he commanded the 213th Regional Support Group. By now a resident of Reinholds, Pennsylvania, he served as Pennsylvania's deputy United States Property and Fiscal Officer from October 2015 to May 2016.

== Later career ==
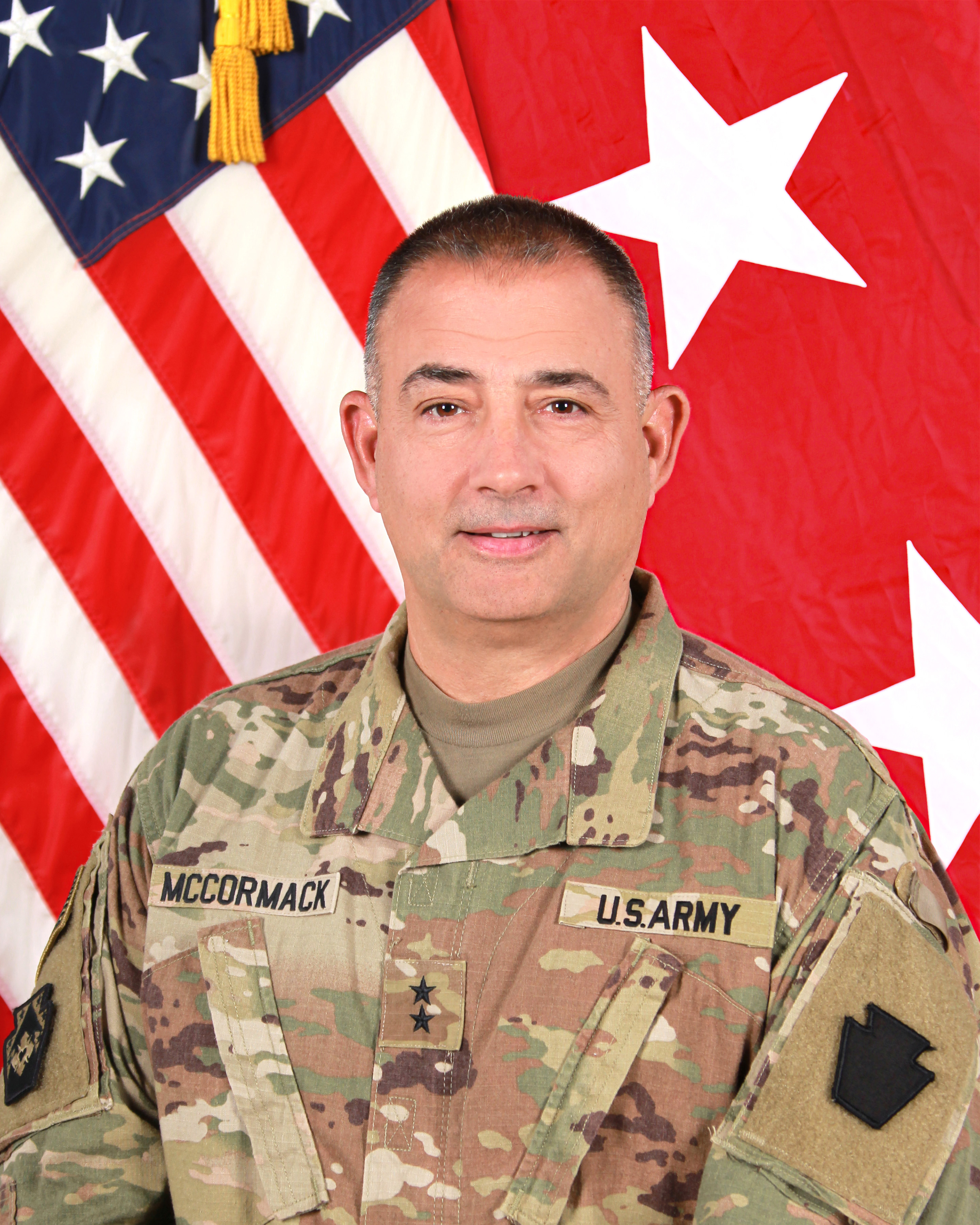
McCormack as 28th Infantry Division Commander in 2022

From May 2016 to May 2020, McCormack served as assistant division commander of the 28th Infantry Division. During this posting, he took part in Operation Inherent Resolve in Kuwait from January to December 2018. In April and May 2020, he carried out dual status commander duty for National Guard members assigned to Pennsylvania's COVID-19 response effort.

In May 2020, McCormack was appointed to command of the 28th Infantry Division, and he was promoted to major general in July. He continued to lead the division until February 2024, when he was assigned to temporary duty as a special assistant to the director of the Army National Guard. In July 2024, McCormack was assigned as deputy commanding general of First United States Army. He served in this position and as commander of First Army Division East prior to its inactivation. McCormack retired in 2026.

== Awards ==
McCormack as commander, First Army Division East in 2026

=== Federal awards ===
McCormack's federal awards include:

- Army Distinguished Service Medal
- Legion of Merit with one bronze oak leaf cluster
- Bronze Star Medal
- Meritorious Service Medal with 1 silver oak leaf cluster
- Army Commendation Medal with 2 bronze oak leaf clusters
- Army Achievement Medal with 1 bronze oak leaf cluster
- Army Meritorious Unit Commendation with 1 bronze oak leaf cluster
- Army Reserve Components Achievement Medal with 1 silver oak leaf cluster and 3 bronze oak leaf clusters
- National Defense Service Medal with 1 bronze service star
- Iraq Campaign Medal with 1 bronze service star
- Global War on Terrorism Expeditionary Medal
- Global War on Terrorism Service Medal
- Armed Forces Service Medal
- Armed Forces Reserve Medal with gold hourglass, M device and numeral 3
- Army Service Ribbon
- Overseas Service Ribbon with numeral 3
- Army Reserve Components Overseas Training Ribbon with numeral 5

=== State awards ===
Among McCormack's state awards are:

- Pennsylvania Meritorious Service Medal
- Pennsylvania Commendation Medal
- Pennsylvania Twenty Year Service Medal with 1 silver star
- Major General Thomas R. White Jr. Medal
- General Thomas J. Stewart Medal with 1 bronze oak leaf cluster
- The Governor's Unit Citation with 2 bronze oak leaf clusters
- The Adjutant General's Staff Identification Badge

== Dates of rank ==
McCormack's dates of rank are:

- Major General, 30 July 2020
- Brigadier General, 7 June 2016
- Colonel, 28 May 2010
- Lieutenant Colonel, 30 December 2004
- Major, 5 September 2000
- Captain, 1 June 1995
- First Lieutenant, 24 May 1991
- Second Lieutenant, 15 May 1988
