= 20th CBRNE Command =

U.S. Army headquarters for CBRNE defense

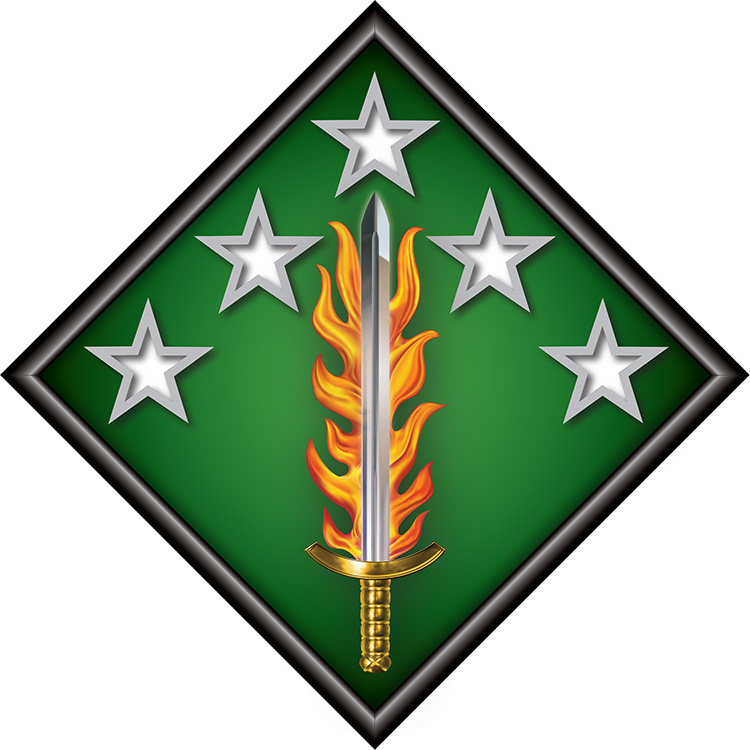
- 20th CBRNE shoulder sleeve insignia
- Active: October 16, 2004 – present
- Country: United States
- Branch: United States Army
- Type: CBRNE Command
- Role: Chemical, Biological, Radiological, Nuclear and high-yield Explosives
- Size: 5,500
- Part of: U.S. Army Western Hemisphere Command
- Garrison/HQ: Aberdeen Proving Ground, Maryland, US

Commanders
- Commander: BG W M Bochat
- Deputy Commander: COL Phillip P. Murrell
- Command Sergeant Major: CSM Dennis R. Kirk

Insignia
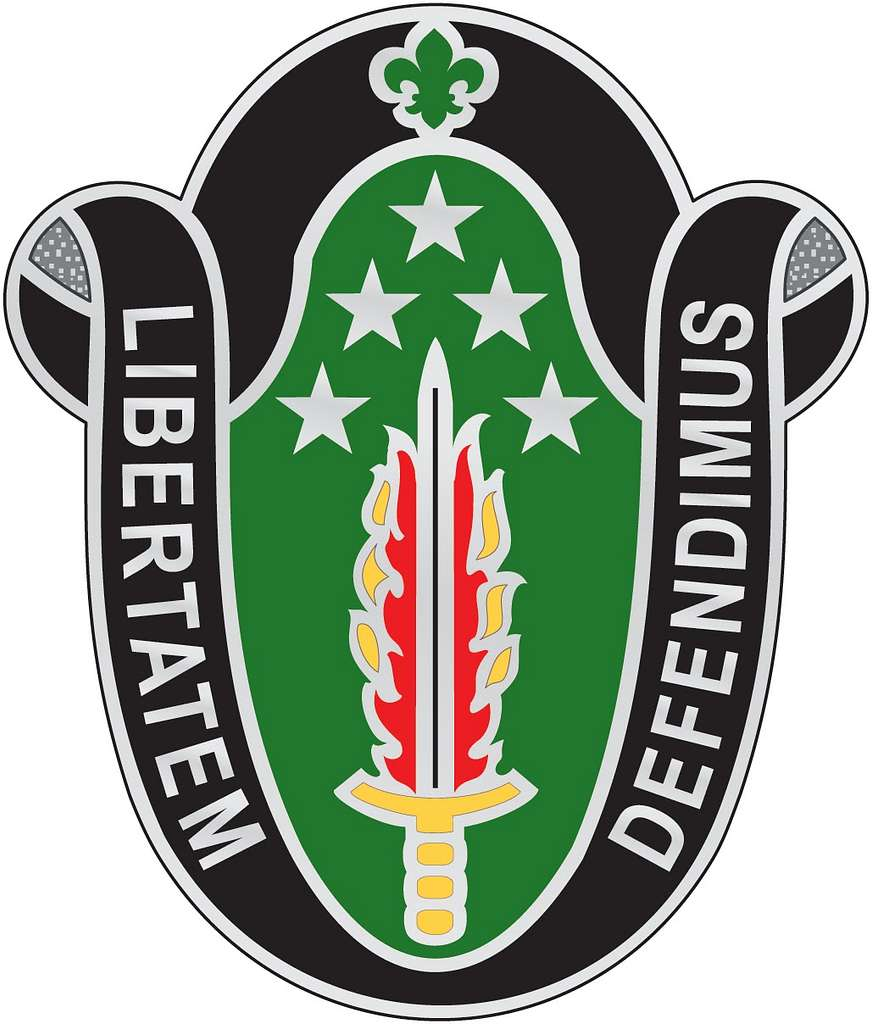
- 20th CBRNE Command DUI

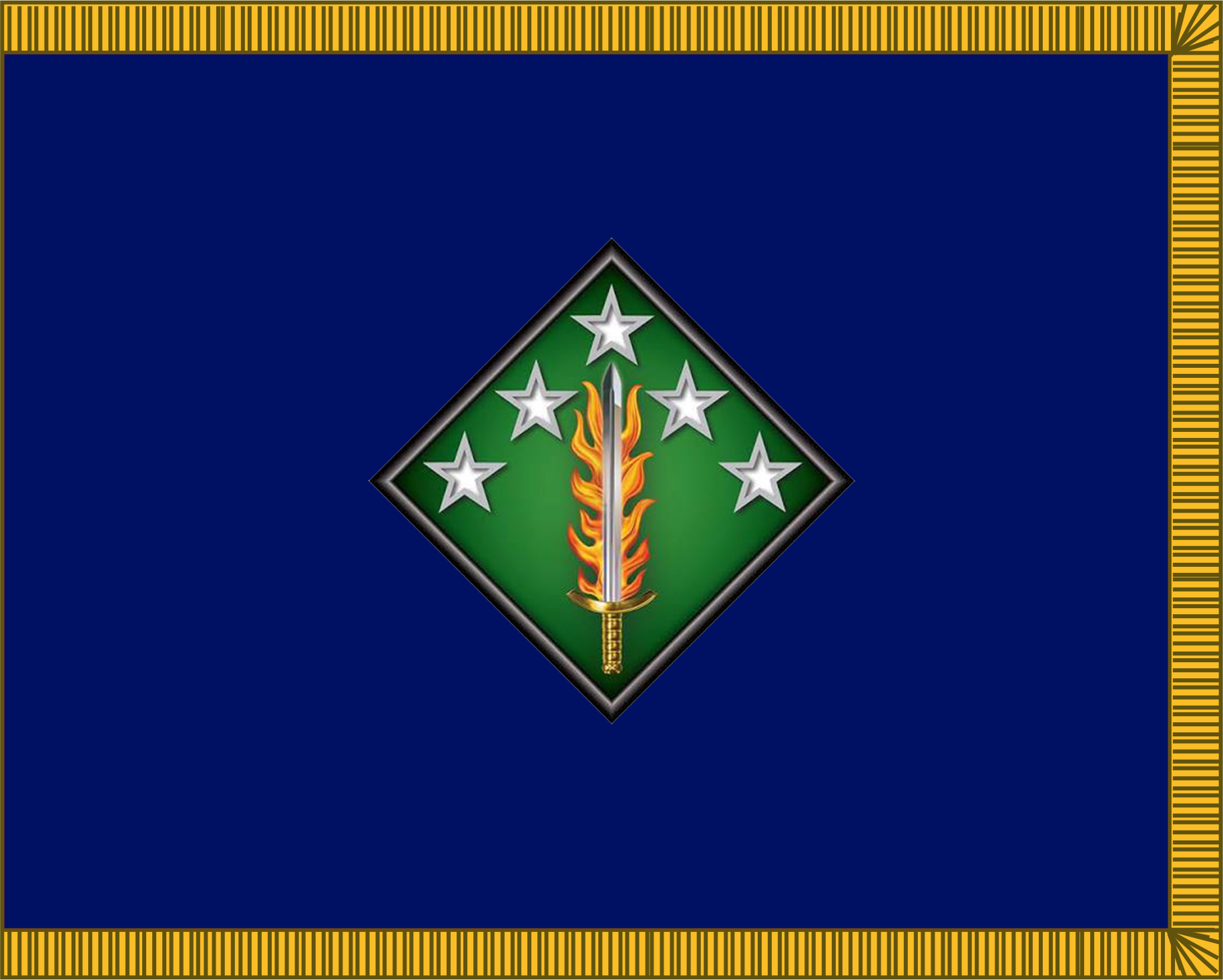
- 20th CBRNE Command Flag

The 20th CBRNE Command is the United States Army headquarters for defense against Chemical, Biological, Radiological, Nuclear, and high-yield Explosives (CBRNE), headquartered on the site of the defunct Edgewood Arsenal chemical weapons production facility at Aberdeen Proving Ground in northern Maryland.

== Command Overview ==
The 20th CBRNE Command was activated 16 Oct. 2004, by U.S. Army Forces Command to provide specialized CBRNE response in support of military operations and civil authorities. Its establishment consolidated a range of unique CBRNE assets from across the Army under a single operational headquarters at Aberdeen Proving Ground, Maryland.

CBRNE operations detect, identify, assess, render-safe, dismantle, transfer, and dispose of unexploded ordnance, improvised explosive devices and other CBRNE hazards. These operations also include decontaminating personnel and property exposed to CBRNE materials during response.

By consolidating these assets under one headquarters, the Army has more effective command and control of its specialized CBRNE elements. This alignment also eliminates operational redundancies and allows more efficient management and employment of these unique—but limited—resources.

The 20th CBRNE Command gives the Army and the nation a scalable response capability with the flexibility to operate in a variety of environments, from urban areas to austere sites across the spectrum of military operations. Subordinate elements include the 48th Chemical Brigade, the 52d Ordnance Group (Explosive Ordnance Disposal), the 71st Ordnance Group (EOD), the CBRNE Analytical and Remediation Activity (known as CARA), three Nuclear Disablement Teams, and five Weapons of Mass Destruction Coordination Teams. These organizations support Combatant Commands and the Homeland in operations and contingencies throughout the world.

When called upon, the command may deploy and serve as a headquarters for the Joint Task Force for Elimination of Weapons of Mass Destruction (JTF-E), as directed by the 2006 Quadrennial Defense Review.

The CBRNE Command leverages sanctuary reach back, linking subject matter experts in America's defense, scientific and technological communities with deployed elements and first responders.

== Nuclear Disablement Teams ==
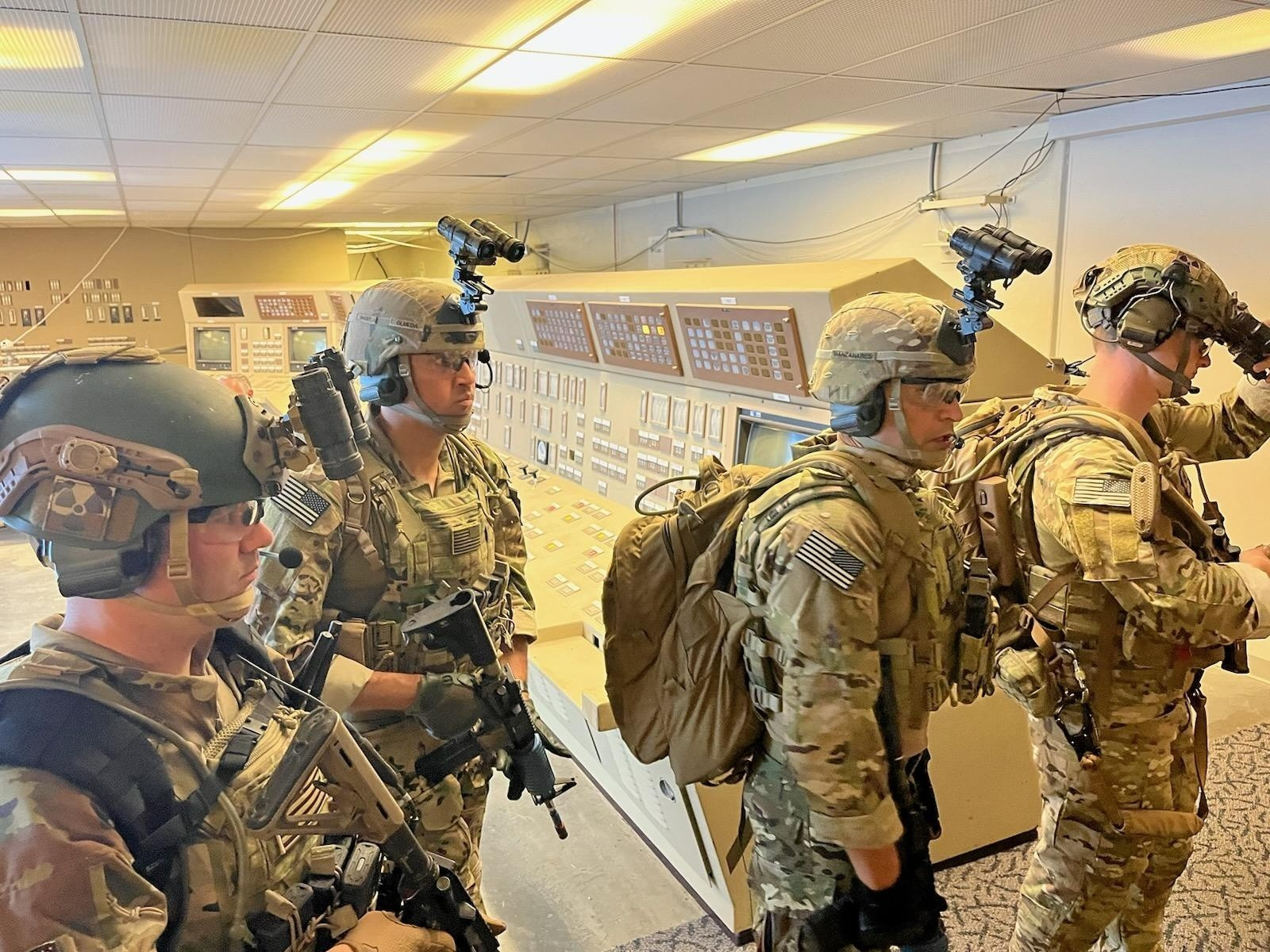
Nuclear Disablement Team 1 along with 5th Special Forces Group (Airborne) during an air assault exercise where they successfully simulated powering down the Bellefonte Nuclear Power Plant.

The 20th CBRNE Command is host to all three of the Department of Defense's specialized non-SOF nuclear disablement teams, all of which are stationed at Aberdeen Proving Ground. The NDTs directly contribute to the nation’s strategic deterrence by staying ready to exploit and disable nuclear and radiological Weapons of Mass Destruction infrastructure and components to deny near-term nuclear and radiological capability to adversaries. NDTs also serve on the FBI-led National Technical Nuclear Forensics Ground Collection Task Force, which stays ready to conduct post-blast nuclear forensics. The NDTs have previously trained with Army Rangers from the 75th Ranger Regiment, and Special Forces operators from 5th Special Forces Group during combat training center rotations.

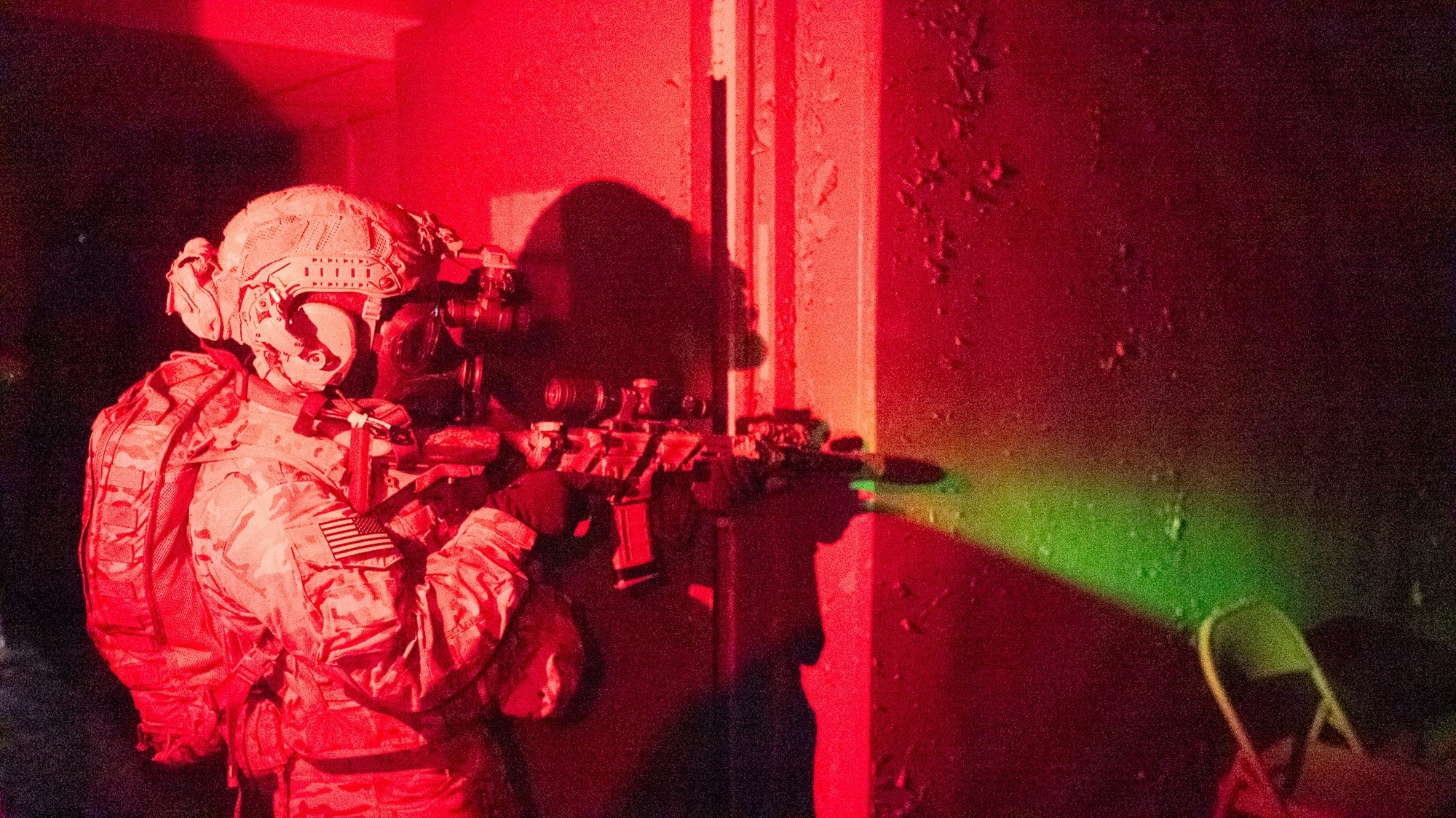
NDT 1 and Army Rangers seizing a decommissioned underground nuclear pulse radiation facility under simulated fire during a training exercise.

== Current structure ==
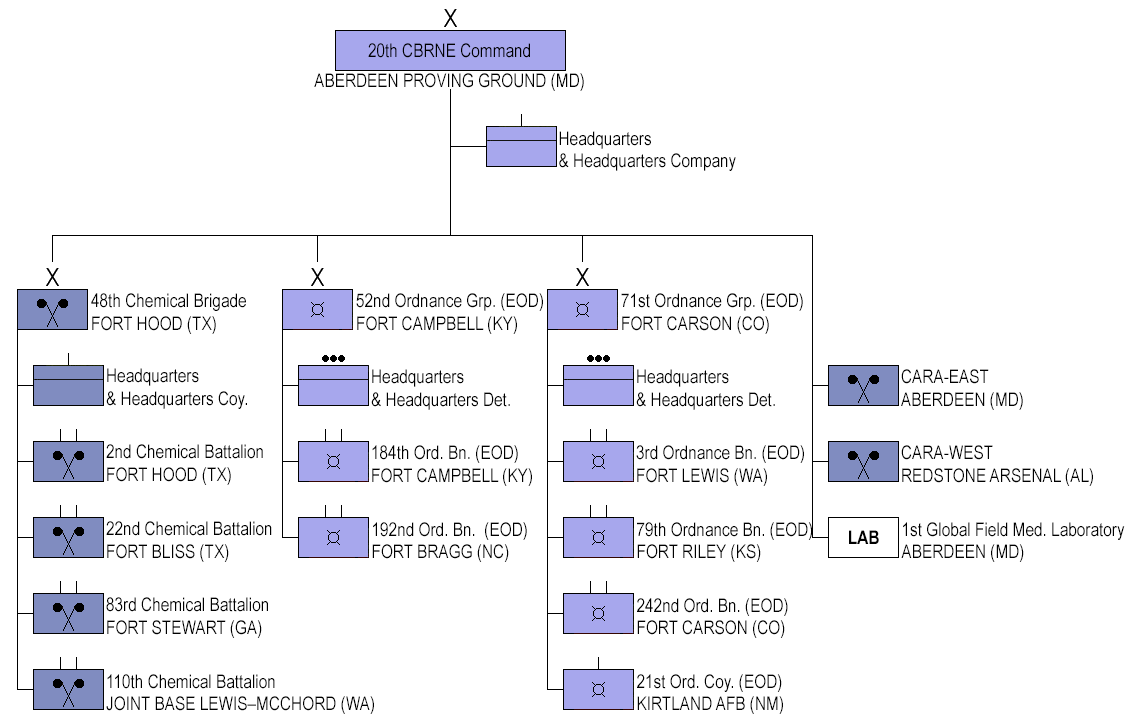
20th CBRNE Command organization 2025

- 20th CBRNE Command Structure, Aberdeen Proving Ground (MD)
  - 48th Chemical Brigade, Fort Hood (TX)
  - 52nd Ordnance Group (EOD), Fort Campbell (KY)
  - 71st Ordnance Group (EOD), Fort Carson (CO)
  - CBRNE Analytical and Remediation Activity-East (CARA), Aberdeen Proving Ground (MD)
  - CBRNE Analytical and Remediation Activity-West (CARA), Redstone Arsenal (AL)
  - 1st Global Field Medical Laboratory, Aberdeen Proving Ground (MD)

Training Readiness Authority:

- Consequence Management Unit (CMU) (Army Reserve), Aberdeen Proving Ground (MD)

== History ==
On 16 October 2004 the 20th CBRNE Command was activated at Aberdeen Proving Ground, Md., as a major subordinate command under US Army Forces Command with the mission of providing an operational headquarters to command and control Army CBRNE operations and serve as the primary Army force provider of specialized CBRNE capabilities.

Assigned to the new headquarters were the 52d EOD Group and its five EOD battalions, and the 22d Chemical Battalion (Technical Escort), formerly known as the Technical Escort Unit. In June 2005, the 71st EOD Group was activated at Fort Carson, Colo. By June 2006, three new EOD battalions were assigned to the 71st EOD Group and the 110th Chemical Battalion (TE) was activated at Ft. Lewis, Wash.

The publishing of the 2006 Quadrennial Defense Review required further alterations to the 20th Support Command’s structure, organization, manning and equipment in order to meet its new requirement to stand-up and serve as the headquarters for the Joint Task Force for Elimination of WMD (JTF-E).

In May 2007, the establishment of the CBRNE Analytical and Remediation Activity (CARA) with four remediation response teams, multiple mobile exploitation laboratories, and an aviation section, marked a key milestone in the Command’s ability to provide the Army with the full spectrum of specialized CBRNE forces and capabilities.

In September 2007, the final major organizational piece was completed when the 48th Chemical Brigade was activated and assumed command of three Chemical Battalions and the two Chemical Technical Escort Battalions.

In addition to the Command’s organic assets the 20th CBRNE Command assumed operational control of the USAR Consequence Management Unit in 2008 and administrative control of the 1st and 9th Area Medical Laboratories.

The CBRNE Command also executes command and control of five WMD-Coordination Elements that deploy to augment combatant commanders or lead federal agencies with their significant CBRNE and combating-WMD expertise and communications assets. The Command’s four Nuclear Disablement Teams provide the final piece of the puzzle and the Command’s ability to execute full-spectrum counter-CBRNE and combating-WMD operations at home and abroad.

In 2008, elements of the Command deployed in support of Operation Iraqi Freedom for sensitive missions leveraging the unique capabilities of this command. The CBRNE Command has deployed over 20 units and headquarters per year in support of OIF and OEF for counter-IED operations, and CBRN force protection, exploitation, and elimination operations and at any time more than 20 percent of the Command is deployed abroad in support of OIF and OEF.

The command maintains a rapid response force for threats in the homeland, and routinely supports the President, other dignitaries, and national special security events. The command now stands with two EOD Groups, one Chemical Brigade, 12 Battalions, more than 65 Companies, and one direct reporting activity. The 20th CBRNE Command continues to transform to meet current and future challenges at home and abroad.

"Liberty We Defend"

=== Training ===
The CBRNE Command also trains foreign governments in CBRN detection and response. The Command trained the Armed Forces of the Philippines at Camp Aguinaldo in 2014. During the training, vehicles carrying explosives were prepared as a test scenario. The AFP bomb squad defused the simulated explosives and the CBRNE Command neutralized the chemical threat. In another exercise, the U.S. Army trained the Kenya Rapid Deployment Capability to respond to HAZMAT/CBRN incidents using SCBA gear.

=== Commanders ===
1. BG Walter L. Davis (October 2004–August 2005)
2. BG Kevin R. Wendel (September 2005–June 2008)
3. BG Jeffrey J. Snow (June 2008–May 2010)
4. MG Leslie C. Smith (July 2010–May 2013)
5. BG JB Burton (May 2013–May 2015)
6. BG William E. King IV (May 2015–July 2017)
7. BG James E. Bonner (July 2017–June 2020)
8. MG Antonio V. Munera (June 2020–September 2022)
9. MG Daryl O. Hood (September 2022–July 2024)
10. BG W M Bochat (July 2024–present)

=== Deputy Commanders ===
1. COL Gene King
2. COL Paul Plemmons
3. COL Raymond Van Pelt
4. COL Thomas Langowski
5. COL Kyle Nordmeyer
6. COL. Marty Muchow
7. COL. Hershey
8. COL. Phillip P. Murrell

=== Command Sergeants Major ===
1. CSM Marvin Womack, Sr., 2005 to 2009
2. CSM Ronald E. Orosz, 2009 to 2011
3. CSM David Puig, 2012 to 2014
4. CSM Harold E. Dunn IV, 2014 to 2016
5. CSM Kenneth M. Graham, 2016 to 2018
6. CSM Henney M. Hodgkins 2018 to 2021
7. CSM Jorge Arzabala Jr. 2021 to 2023
8. CSM David Silva, 2023 to 2025
9. CSM Dennis R. Rirk, 2025 to present

== See also ==
- Bioterrorism
- Explosive Ordnance Disposal
