= Navy Bomb Disposal School =

Former military installation in Washington, DC

- Part of American University
- Washington, D.C.

Site information
- Type: Training installation
- Owner: Navy Department
- Operator: U.S. Navy

Location
- Location of the Navy Bomb Disposal School
- Coordinates: 38°56′13.56″N 77°5′12.84″W

Site history
- In use: 1942–1945
- Battles/wars: World War II

The Navy Bomb Disposal School, was a World War II era U.S. naval training installation built on American University property in Washington, D.C.

== Environmental impact ==
During World War II, American University allowed the U.S. Navy to use part of its campus for bomb disposal training. In 1993, a construction worker stumbled upon some of the buried munitions. This led to major cleanup efforts in the 1990s and 2000s (decade) on the site, which included a corner of the university and several neighboring residences.
