= Thomas G. Miller =

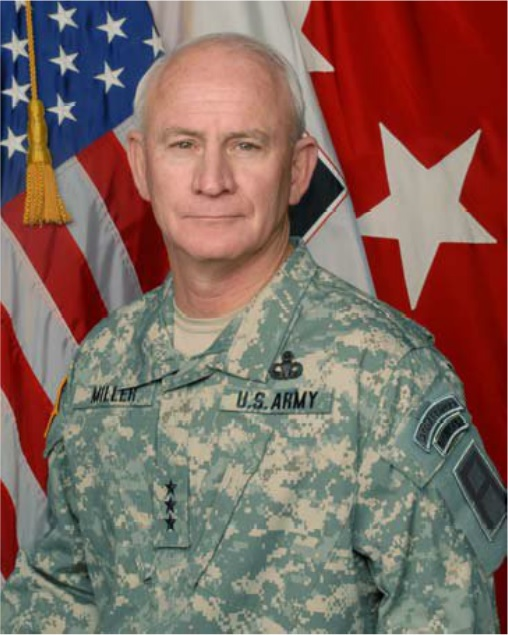
- Military career
- Allegiance: United States
- Branch: United States Army
- Service years: 1973–2011
- Rank: Lieutenant General
- Commands: First United States Army; United States Army in Japan; Director of Operations-US Forces Iraq
- Conflicts: Iraq War
- Awards: Army Distinguished Service Medal (2); Defense Superior Service Medal (2); Legion of Merit (5); Bronze Star Medal

Lieutenant General Thomas G. Miller is a retired senior officer of the United States Army and a former commander of the First United States Army. As head of the First Army, Miller was responsible for the training, readiness and mobilization of National Guard and Army Reserve units in all states and territories as they prepare for deployment as needed by United States combat commanders globally. He is the son of the late Colonel William H. Miller, who served in World War II, Korea, and Vietnam.

== Military career ==
Miller was commissioned in 1973 as an Infantry Officer after graduating from the University of Southern Mississippi as a Distinguished Military Graduate. He has served primarily with Infantry, Special Forces and Airborne units. This included assignments in the 7th Special Forces Group, 82d Airborne Division, 101st Airborne Division, 10th Mountain Division and the 25th Infantry Division. Additionally he served overseas in Iraq, Kuwait, Haiti, Hawaii, Korea, and Japan. Prior to commanding the First Army, he served as the Director of Operations for FORSCOM and in Iraq as the Director of Operations for CJTF-7, and later as the Director of Strategic Operations for Multinational Forces Iraq. Miller is also a graduate of the United States Army War College and holds a Master of Science in Management.

== Awards and decorations ==
Expert Infantryman Badge
Master Parachutist Badge
Air Assault Badge
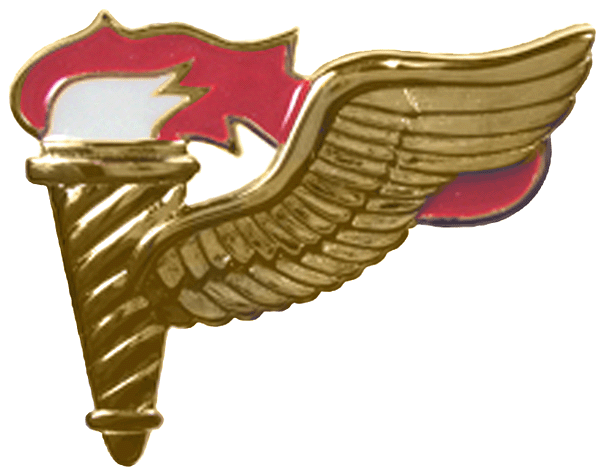
Pathfinder Badge
Ranger tab
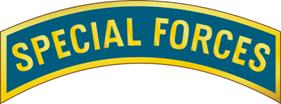
Special Forces Tab
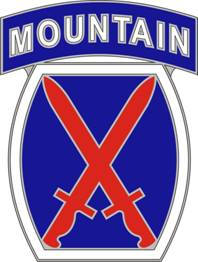
10th Mountain Division Combat Service Identification Badge
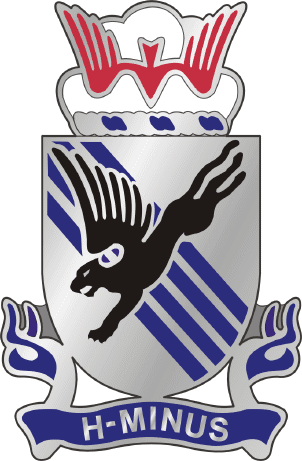
505th Infantry Regiment Distinctive Unit Insignia

Army Distinguished Service Medal with one bronze oak leaf cluster
Defense Superior Service Medal with oak leaf cluster
Legion of Merit with four oak leaf clusters
Bronze Star
Meritorious Service Medal with six oak leaf clusters
Army Commendation Medal with two oak leaf clusters
Joint Meritorious Unit Award
National Defense Service Medal with two bronze service stars
Armed Forces Expeditionary Medal
Humanitarian Service Medal
Army Service Ribbon
Army Overseas Service Ribbon

=== Other ===
Miller is also a member of the University of Southern Mississippi ROTC Hall of Fame.
