= United States Security Assistance Organizations =

United States Security Assistance Organizations (SAOs) are Department of Defense military and civilian personnel stationed abroad to manage security assistance and other military programs. SAOs are closest to these programs' operation and have the closest contact with host-country militaries.

In general, they are not to be confused with defense attachés, who normally play a more diplomatic role. Many U.S. embassies have both defense attachés and SAOs.

Security assistance organizations go by different names in different countries. These names include Military Groups (MILGROUPs), Military Assistance and Advisory Groups (MAAGs), Military Liaison Offices (MLOs), Offices of the Defense Representative (ODRs), Offices of Security Cooperation (OSC) (one example is the Office of Defense Cooperation Turkey), and the Office of Military Cooperation (OMC).

The Office of Security Cooperation - Iraq, part of the larger embassy of the United States, Baghdad after the 2011 U.S. withdrawal held the remaining DOD support personnel, totalling about 1,000 contractors and about 147 DOD uniformed personnel. It operated from ten locations around Iraq, and managed about 370 Foreign Military Sales cases, totalling more than US $9 billion of pending arms sales, citing a February 2012 Congressional Research Service report. The biggest program underway was the much-delayed sale of 18 Lockheed Martin F-16 Fighting Falcon fighters. The Office was headed by Lieutenant General Robert L. Caslen. OSC-Iraq was established on October 1, 2011. Lt Gen John M. Bednarek succeeded Caslen.

The Office of the Defense Representative, Pakistan, was the Islamabad presence.

There are also non-DOD entities carrying out similar activities. The Department of State's Bureau of Political-Military Affairs runs the Global Defense Reform Program (GDRP), amongst others.

== Duties ==
SAOs' duties are officially referred to as "overseas military program management". Specific responsibilities may include managing Foreign Military Sales (FMS) cases, managing training programs, monitoring security-assistance programs, evaluating and planning the host country's military capabilities and requirements, promoting international defense cooperation and interoperability between forces, providing administrative support, and other liaison functions.

== Responsibilities ==
Typically, SAOs are responsible for a number of different tasks listed in the Department of Defense Manual, The Management of Security Assistance:

- Provide foreign governments with information they need to help them decide whether to buy U.S. defense articles and services. This information might concern the acquisition, use, and training needed to obtain these items
- Evaluate host countries' military capabilities, in order to process security assistance requests
- Acquire information concerning foreign governments' potential future defense acquisitions
- Help U.S. military departments (such as the Army or Navy) arrange security assistance for recipient countries
- Assist host governments in identifying, administering, and disposing of excess security assistance materiel
- Report on the use of defense articles and services granted as aid to the host country, as well as personnel trained by the United States
- Inform other Defense Department offices with security-assistance responsibilities of security assistance activities in host countries
- Perform secondary functions, such as advisory and training services and negotiation on non-security assistance military matters
- Perform command and administrative functions.

SAOs also coordinate or participate in activities not traditionally regarded as "security assistance," such as exercises and deployments, humanitarian civic assistance activities, exchanges, conferences and other military-to-military contact programs.

Section 515 (e) of the Foreign Assistance Act states that SAOs are to be under the direct supervision of the Ambassador to the country in which they are stationed. However, the Management of Security Assistance states that: "The Chief of the SAO is essentially responsible to three authorities: the Ambassador (who heads up the country team), the Commander of the Unified Command, and the Director, Defense Security Cooperation Agency."

Funding for the portion of SAO salaries and operating costs used to manage security assistance comes from the Foreign Military Financing (FMF) program and from administrative surcharges on Foreign Military Sales (FMS).

== Law ==
Section 515 of the Foreign Assistance Act of 1961 (P.L. 87-195, or the "FAA"), as amended, governs SAO staffing and responsibilities.

Limitations

Section 515(b) mandates that SAOs keep advisory and training assistance to an absolute minimum. This provision's intent is to specify that SAOs should manage training and advice provided by others, not carry it out themselves.

- The number of military members of an SAO cannot exceed six unless specifically authorized by Congress.
- Section 515(f) orders the President to instruct SAOs that they "should not encourage, promote, or influence the purchase by any foreign country of United States-made military equipment, unless they are specifically instructed to do so by an appropriate official of the executive branch."

Reporting

- SAO staff sizes must be included in the Congressional Presentation documents submitted each February with the administration's budget request.

Notification

- If the President wishes to exceed the maximum of six military SAO members, the Senate Foreign Relations Committee and the House International Relations Committee must be notified 30 days in advance.
- If the President wishes to exceed the number of military SAO members listed in the yearly State Department Congressional Presentation (even if the number will not exceed six), the Senate Foreign Relations Committee and the House International Relations Committee must be notified 30 days in advance.
