= Michael S. Tucker =

United States Army general

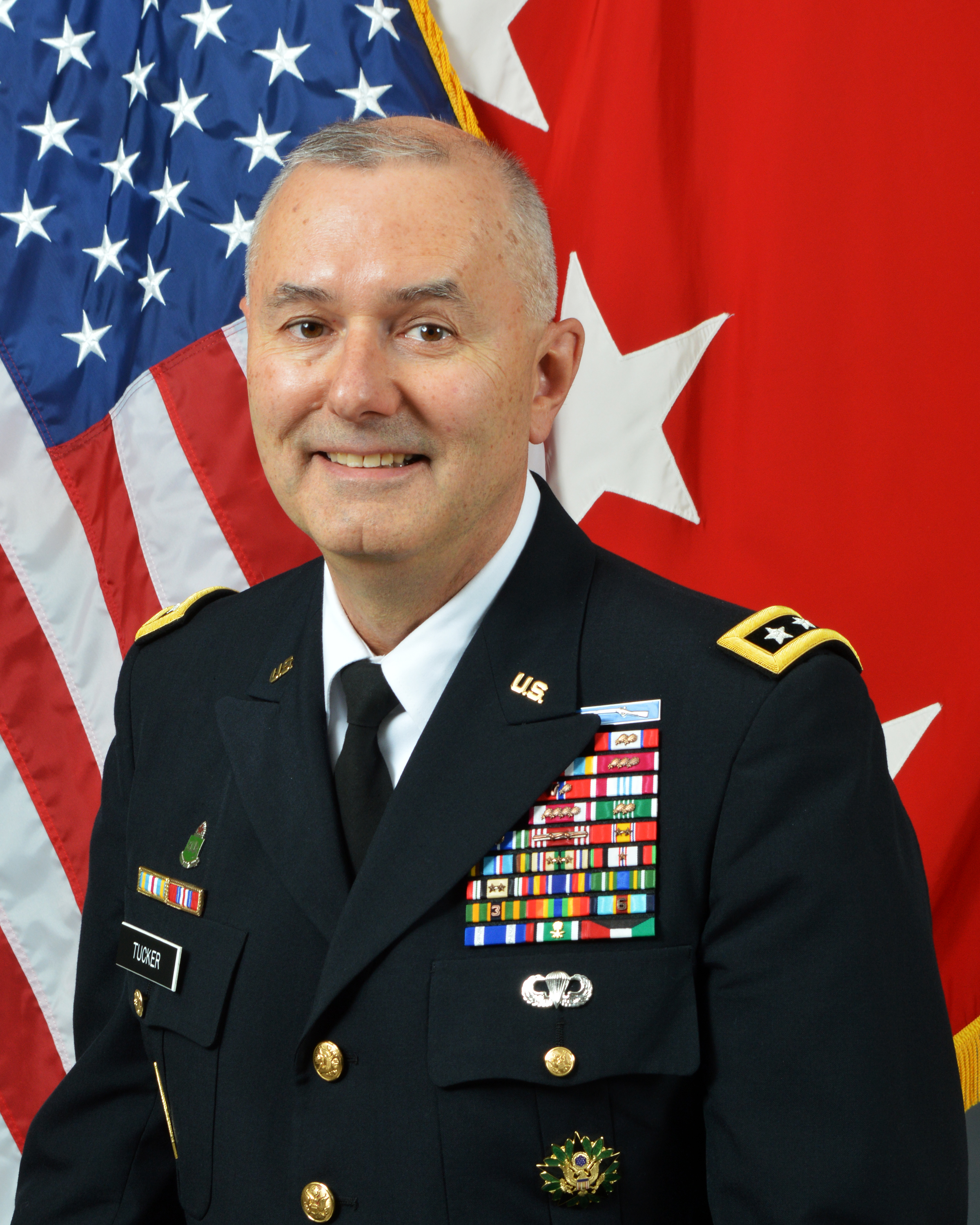
- Born: September 14, 1954 (age 72); Charlotte, North Carolina
- Military career
- Allegiance: United States
- Branch: United States Army
- Service years: 1972–2016
- Rank: Lieutenant General
- Commands: First United States Army; 2nd Infantry Division; 1st Brigade, 1st Armored Division; 1st Battalion, 64th Armor
- Conflicts: Gulf War; Iraq War; War in Afghanistan
- Awards: Army Distinguished Service Medal (4); Defense Superior Service Medal; Legion of Merit (4); Bronze Star Medal (2)

Lieutenant General Michael S. Tucker (born September 14, 1954) is a retired United States Army general who served Commanding General of the First United States Army from 2013 until 2016. He formerly served as the Commanding General of the 2nd Infantry Division.

On March 9, 2007, The Washington Post reported Army Vice Chief of Staff General Richard A. Cody's announcement that Tucker, a former enlisted soldier and a non-member of the United States Army Medical Corps, had been selected to take over the Deputy Commander position at Walter Reed Army Medical Center as part of a major "leadership restructuring at Walter Reed ... designed to attack problems and lapses exposed" in the growing scandal over poor healthcare and treatment conditions of wounded combat outpatients at the historic medical facility, uncovered in an undercover exposé by Washington Post reporters.

== Background and experience ==
A native of Charlotte, North Carolina, Michael S. "Mike" Tucker enlisted in the United States Army as a private in 1972. He served as a cavalry scout with the 1st Battalion, 35th Armor in Erlangen, Germany, reaching the rank of staff sergeant in 1977. In 1979, after two years as a drill sergeant in the 3rd Basic Combat Training Brigade at Fort Leonard Wood, Missouri, he was accepted into Officer Candidate School, where he graduated as a Distinguished Military Graduate.

After being commissioned as a lieutenant in the armor branch, Tucker's first assignment was as a tank platoon leader in B Company, 1st Battalion, 35th Armor, Germany. During this tour from January 1980 until July 1984 he served as a Tank Company Executive Officer, Battalion Motor Officer, commanded the Battalion's Combat Support Company and C Company. Following stateside schooling, he returned to Germany in January 1986 to command Headquarters and Headquarters Company, 1st Battalion, 35th Armor. He then served as the Battalion Adjutant, Deputy Sub-Community Commander of Ferris Barracks, and finally as the S3, 1st Battalion, 35th Armor in Operation Desert Shield and Operation Desert Storm.

Tucker attended Army Command and General Staff College in 1991 and 1992, and was then assigned as an assistant professor at the United States Military Academy at West Point, New York. He was then selected to serve as a joint staff officer, and was assigned as Chief, Joint Network Simulations at the Air Command and Staff College at Maxwell Air Force Base in Montgomery, Alabama. He commanded 1st Battalion, 64th Armor, 3rd Infantry Division (Mechanized) from June 1996 to June 1998 at Fort Stewart, Georgia, and following attendance at the U.S. Army War College, was assigned as the G3, 3d Infantry Division (Mechanized) from June 1999 to February 2001.

In March 2001 as a Colonel, Tucker assumed command of the 1st Brigade, 1st Armored Division, which culminated in a combat tour in support of Operation Iraqi Freedom, and then assumed duties as the Executive Officer to the Commanding General U.S. Army Europe and Seventh United States Army. After completing this tour, Tucker was promoted to Brigadier General and assigned as the Assistant Division Commander (Maneuver) of the 1st Armored Division from August 2004 to August 2005. He then moved over to become the Assistant Division Commander (Support) from August 2005 until June 2006. Shortly after, General Tucker was selected to succeed Brigadier General Albert Bryant, Jr., as the Deputy Commanding General/Assistant Commandant of the United States Army Armor Center at Fort Knox, Kentucky. General Tucker was then assigned to the Walter Reed Army Medical Center in April 2007.

== Walter Reed Army Medical Center scandal ==
On February 18, 2007, the Washington Post began publishing a series of articles outlining cases of neglect at the Walter Reed Army Medical Center reported by wounded soldiers and their family members. As additional coverage by the Washington Post and other news outlets continued, congressional hearings convened, and a growing scandal emerged. The commander of Walter Reed Army Medical Center, Major General George W. Weightman was relieved of his command, and Secretary of the Army Francis J. Harvey was asked to resign as well, with the Army promising further restructuring and leadership changes to address the situation.

On March 8, 2007, Army Vice Chief of Staff General Richard A. Cody's announced that Tucker would report to Washington to take over the Deputy Commander position at Walter Reed Army Medical Center as part of a major "leadership restructuring at Walter Reed ... designed to attack problems and lapses exposed: in the growing scandal." Additionally, General Cody expressed his wish to "ensure that veterans returning from Iraq and Afghanistan receive the care and respect they deserve" and offered his belief that "new leadership is key to fixing problems that let outpatient soldiers fall through the cracks." Explaining the Army's selection of a non-medical corps Tucker, Cody pointed to Tucker's experience as a combat officer:

He understands soldiers. He understands leading in combat. He understands how to run large organizations. He's going to be the guy that we look to be the soldiers' and families' advocate as they go through inpatient and outpatient, but also he's going to be the bureaucratic buster... and take on this bureaucracy that at times frustrates our soldiers.

== Later career ==
After completing his tour at Walter Reed, Tucker was assigned as Deputy Chief of Staff for Operations, International Security Assistance Force (Afghanistan), where he served until 2009. Promoted to Major General, Tucker then commanded 2nd Infantry Division in South Korea from September 2009 to September 2011, followed by an assignment as the Department of the Army's Assistant Deputy Chief of Staff G-3/5/7. On August 2, 2013, General Tucker was promoted to Lieutenant General and assigned to succeed interim commander Kevin R. Wendel as the new Commanding General of the First United States Army, stationed at the Rock Island Arsenal.

Tucker retired in July 2016, and was succeeded at First Army by Stephen M. Twitty.

== Education ==
Tucker's civilian education includes a Bachelor of Science Degree in Psychology from the University of Maryland, a master's degree in Military Arts and Sciences from the U.S. Army Command and General Staff College, and a master's degree in Public Administration from Shippensburg University.

== Awards and decorations ==
- Expert Infantryman Badge
- Basic Parachutist Badge
- Army Staff Identification Badge
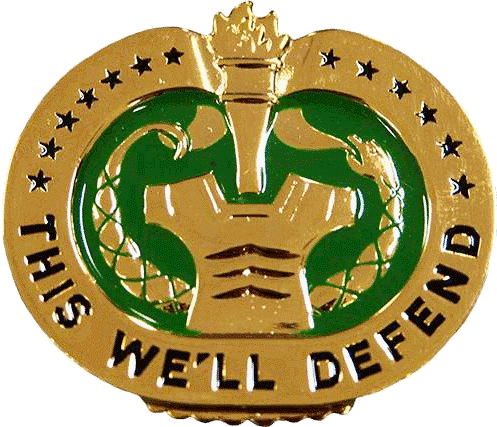
- Drill Sergeant Identification Badge
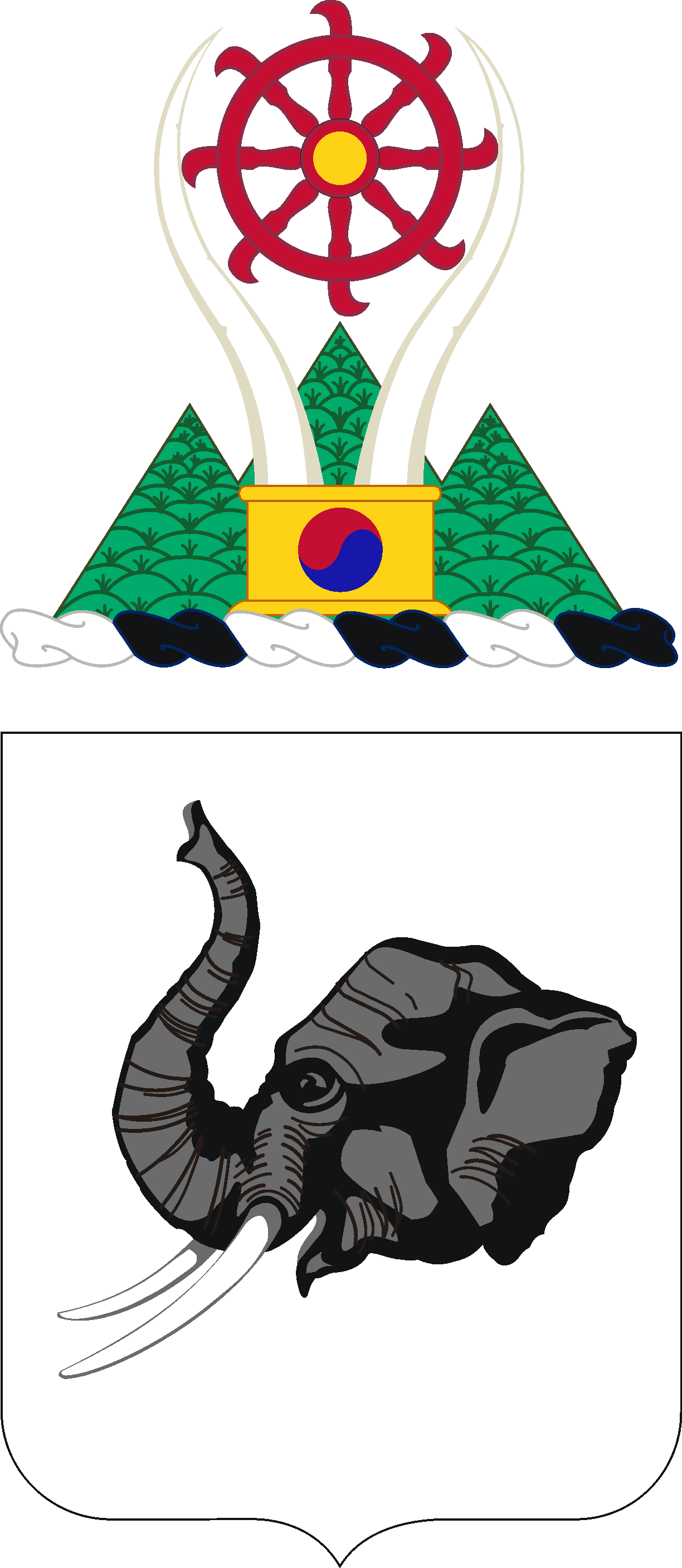
- 64th Armor Regiment Distinctive Unit Insignia
- 1st Armored Division Combat Service Identification Badge
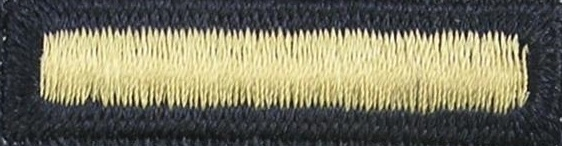
- 4 Overseas Service Bars
- Distinguished Service Medal (3 Oak Leaf Clusters)
- Defense Superior Service Medal
- Legion of Merit (3 Oak Leaf Clusters)
- Bronze Star Medal with "V" device (1 Oak Leaf Cluster)
- Defense Meritorious Service Medal
- Meritorious Service Medal (4 Oak Leaf Clusters)
- Army Commendation Medal (2 Oak Leaf Clusters)
- Army Achievement Medal (1 Oak Leaf Clusters)
- Joint Meritorious Unit Award
- Valorous Unit Award
- Army Good Conduct Medal (2 bronze knots)
- National Defense Service Medal (2 Star)
- Armed Forces Expeditionary Medal
- Southwest Asia Service Medal (3 Stars)
- Afghanistan Campaign Medal (2 Stars)
- Iraq Campaign Medal (1 Star)
- Global War on Terrorism Service Medal
- Korea Defense Service Medal
- NCO Professional Development Ribbon (3 Device)
- Army Service Ribbon
- Overseas Service Ribbon (5 Device)
- NATO Medal ISAF
- Kuwait Liberation Medal (Saudi Arabia)
- Kuwait Liberation Medal (Kuwait)

Lieutenant General Tucker has also earned the German Ranger Badge.
