= 22nd Chemical Battalion (United States) =

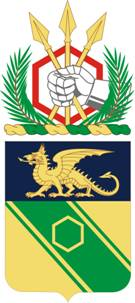
- Coat of arms
- Country: United States
- Branch: United States Army
- Nickname: America's Guardians
- Motto: Always Ready

Insignia
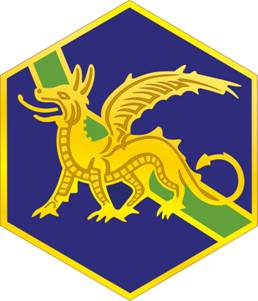
- Distinctive Insignia

== Mission and Capabilities ==
The 22nd Chemical Battalion (CBRNE) is a unit of the U. S. Army Chemical Corps known as "America’s Guardians." As of March 2021 the battalion is stationed at Fort Bliss, TX. The battalion provides command, planning, integration, direction and execution of Chemical, Biological, Radiological, Nuclear, and Explosive (CBRNE) missions. Hazard Response (HR) capability includes mounted and dismounted reconnaissance and surveillance supporting maneuver formations. HR also includes decontamination of personnel, equipment and mass casualty decontamination. Technical Escort (TE) is the capability to locate, identify, sample, render safe, package, transport and neutralize suspected WMD materials. The battalion also provides Explosive Ordnance Disposal (EOD) services.

== Companies ==
As of March 2021 the 22nd Chemical Battalion is composed of six companies.

The Six Companies of the 22nd Chemical Battalion
Company	Function	Nickname	Motto	Crest
Headquarters and Headquarters Company	Command	"Shield"	Shields Up!	
10th Chemical Company (HR)	Hazard Response	"Enforcers"	Defenders of the Corps!	
44th Chemical Company (HR)	Hazard Response	"Dragons of Hell"	To Hell and Back!	
46th Chemical Company (TE)	Tech Escort	"Dirty"	Team Dirty, Dirty Deeds!	
734th Ordnance Company (EOD)	Explosive Ordnance Disposal	"Luchadores"	None	
741st Ordnance Company (EOD)	Explosive Ordnance Disposal	"Matadors"	None	

== Formation ==
The lineage of the 22nd Chemical Battalion begins with the introduction of chemical warfare in World War I. In 1917, as the American Expeditionary Force prepared to sail for Europe, American military leaders recognized the need for a specialized unit to employ and protect against chemical weapons on the battlefield. To meet this need, the Army established the 30th Engineer Regiment (Gas and Flame). On 26 November 1917, the Regiment was expanded to include C Company. It is with C Company / 30th Engineer Regiment that the 22nd Chemical Battalion's story begins.

== 30th Engineers ==
On 26 February 1918, the soldiers of C Company boarded the USS Agamemnon, and on 10 March disembarked at Brest, France. The company was billeted at Humes in Northeast France, where it was trained by Royal Engineers in the use of and defense against chemical weapons.

The basic weapon, the Livens projector, was an 8-inch drawn steel tube about 4 feet long with a cap welded on the lower end. This was buried in the ground with the open end protruding a foot or so. Then a package of propelling charge and ignition wiring was placed in the bottom of the tube and on top of that, a thin-walled bomb or "drum" containing high explosive or a chemical agent. Projectors were emplaced in banks numbering in the hundreds and fired simultaneously by electrical detonation. The result was a large amount of gas landing on an enemy position suddenly and without warning. The maximum range of the Livens projector was about 1000 yards which meant the digging in was often necessary in front of the Allied infantry lines. The soldiers, by now nick-named the "Hellfire Boys," had to carry the projectors, propellant, and bombs into position in No Man's Land, then dig them in within easy hearing distance of German machine guns, artillery fire, and patrols. It was not unusual for a "dig" to take place in the midst of a battle involving hundreds of troops attempting to destroy or to protect the emplacement of the projectors.

A complementary weapon to the Livens Projector was the 4-inch Stokes mortar which could be broken down into several pieces weighing less than 100 pounds each, making it easier to move and emplace. The mortar could easily be carried into position and set up for firing without the delay and noise of digging in. It could be fired at a maximum rate of 20 rounds per minute with about 7 pounds of payload per shell. The sustained rate of fire and payload enabled mortars to provide sustained chemical fires on an enemy position. The men learned to set up attacks in which initial fire from projectors produced casualties by catching the enemy before protective equipment could be donned. As the initial cloud dissipated the mortars took over the attack by maintaining a gas concentration for an indefinite period. This forced the enemy to "fight dirty", remaining in an increased protective posture that significantly degraded their effectiveness with conventional weapons during an Allied infantry attack.

On 7 April 1918, C Company entered the war in support of Allied operations during the Lorraine 1918 campaign. Today the 22D Chemical Battalion's colors carry the Lorraine 1918 streamer, an award which is not carried on the colors of the U.S. Army because no other American units participated.

On 8 July C Company fired the first chemical attack by American troops operating independently. Only part of the company conducted the 565 projector "dig" because poor liaison with the adjacent infantry units forced them to provide their own security. Because of defective ignition wiring only 464 of the projectors actually fired, a performance that would be regarded as highly unsatisfactory within a few weeks.

== 1st Gas Regiment ==
A few days later, on 13 July 1918, the 30th Engineer Regiment was re-designated as the 1st Gas Regiment. Under this designation, C Company used both Livens projectors and Stokes mortars in the campaigns of St. Mihiel and Meuse-Argonne. Today the 22nd Chemical Battalion carries these streamers on its colors.

On 24 December the Regiment embarked and arrived in the US a month later, proceeding to Camp Kendrick, New Jersey where it was demobilized on 28 February 1919. C Company, 1st Gas Regiment had spent only a few short months supporting AEF combat operations in Europe, but the lessons it learned would shape the future of the newly established Gas Warfare Service, and of the future 22nd Chemical Battalion.

On 3 February 1920, the 1st Gas Regiment was reorganized and reactivated. It was part of a newly created but tiny Chemical Warfare Service (CWS) which comprised only the 1st Gas Regiment and a few separate service, laboratory, and depot companies. The regiment, including C Company, was stationed at Edgewood Arsenal, MD. Among the major duties of the regiment was maintaining and securing the stocks of mustard, phosgene, and other chemical warfare agents that had been produced in great quantities but had not been shipped to Europe before the Armistice. In January 1926, C Company was re-stationed from Edgewood Arsenal to Corazol in the Panama Canal Department.

== 1st Chemical Company ==
On 13 July 1927, C Company was reorganized and redesignated as the 1st Chemical Company and remained located at Corazol. No warfare agents were stored at Corazol, but there were stocks of other chemicals such as pesticides and chlorine for water purification. Corazol station was a remote outpost. The isolation from the rest of the CWS gave rise to strong feelings of unit identity. This is why the unit insignia today bears a green stripe reminiscent of the canal crossing the Panamanian Isthmus.

At the start of WWII, the strategic significance of the Panama Canal became evident to American planners. The Pentagon began to draw up plans to defend the Canal, including using Chemical Weapons against landing sites on both the Atlantic and Pacific shores. To support these operations a new 4.2-inch chemical mortar was fielded to the 1st Chemical Company. Thereafter duties included munitions maintenance and field training focused on the defending the canal and maintaining the lines of communication between the Atlantic and Pacific Theaters of Operations.

On 30 March 1943, the 1st Chemical Company was re-stationed to Camp Sibert, Alabama to support the CWS Replacement Training Center which had moved from Edgewood. Two factors soon took the company out of the training business. One was a change in the organizational structure at Camp Sibert and the other was the need for personnel in the newly formed Guard and Security Service, famous in later years as "Technical Escort." The 22nd CBRN Battalion would later inherit all of the traditions of Tech Escort but its official lineage is interrupted with the deactivation of the 1st Chemical Company on 29 May 1943.

The official lineage resumes 15 years later with the reactivation of the 1st Chemical Company on 10 March 1958, at Fort McClellan, Alabama where the Chemical Corps School was located. The company supported execution of the eight-week training course in chemical warfare.

== 22nd Chemical Company ==
On 19 May 1958, the 1st Chemical Company was re-designated as the 22nd Chemical Company. The 22nd transferred to Cam Ranh Bay, Vietnam on 1 May 1966. It was deactivated less than two months later on 20 July 1966. Into that short period was packed an intense program of direct support that spanned two campaigns, COUNTEROFFENSIVE and COUNTEROFFENSIVE PHASE 2, for which the 22nd Chemical Battalion now carries streamers on its colors.

The company arrived with a variety of capabilities. It could field mobile teams to inspect, service and repair protective masks and flamethrowers. It could seed enemy bunkers and tunnels with persistent teargas (CS). It could conduct aerial and ground-based defoliation operations. It operated mobile shower teams to provide showers for units in areas accessible to 2 ½ ton trucks. It could deploy insecticide sprays from vehicular mounted dispensers and could construct field flame expedients as part of position defenses.

Chemical soldiers were often tasked to rig field flame expedients (technically known as "fougasse" installations) as part of the defenses around US positions. These devices exploded gasoline or napalm from a buried drum and inflicted fatal burns over an area of several thousand square feet.

Wide area defoliation missions were carried out by spray from a large, fixed wing aircraft with a chemical officer in a small airplane acting as spotter and controller. Limited area defoliation missions, such as roadside growth or underbrush around a defensive position were conducted at low altitude from helicopters. Chemical soldiers riding as crew would load their spraying apparatus and distribute the material as the pilot flew along the target areas. The soldiers returned from these missions drenched in the chemicals that were being disbursed. Agent Orange, which came in orange-striped barrels, interfered with growth hormones and caused trees to lose their leaves. In later years, Agent Orange was associated with a wide range of illnesses including severe birth defects. After deactivation at Cam Ranh Bay on 20 July 1966, the 22nd Chemical Company was inactive for 13 years. Then on 21 September 1979, it was reactivated in Drake Kaserne, Frankfurt, Germany and assigned to the 3rd Armored Division (3AD). This assignment lasted 13 years, until inactivation on 15 August 1992. The Cold War was still intense. Germany would be the central battleground in a conflict with the Russians, who were known to have chemical warfare capabilities. The 3AD conducted constant field exercises, many of them with German units. These required support from the 22nd in reconnaissance and decontamination. Mechanical smoke generation was still a chemical task, and the company's smoke platoon was kept busy screening movements and covering river crossings.

In 1990 Iraq invaded Kuwait and the U.S. military undertook Operation Desert Shield to prevent further Iraqi aggression. The 3AD deployed to Saudi Arabia in November 1990, with the reinforced smoke platoon of the 22nd Chemical Company on the extreme right (east) flank of the division. The platoon lived for months in their tracked M1059 smoke generator vehicles, surrounded by featureless desert. The ground war, Operation Desert Storm, began on 25 January 1991, and the next four days were a race to cut off the Iraqi Army, moving day and night across the desert. During this maneuver, known as "The 100-hour War" the chemical vehicles traveled with the armor as it destroyed countless Iraqi vehicles of every description. After reaching Phase Line SMASH the platoon crossed the North-South Highway and took up station near Safwan, Iraq, just north of the border with Kuwait. While waiting to return to Germany, it ran a supply point that fed more than 11,000 refugees.

For this deployment the 22nd Chemical Battalion carries on its colors streamers for three campaigns: DEFENSE OF SAUDI ARABIA, LIBERATION AND DEFENSE OF KUWAIT, and CEASE-FIRE. The unit also received a Meritorious Unit Citation, with a streamer that reads SOUTHWEST ASIA 1990–91. Shortly before the deployment to Saudi Arabia, the collapse of the Soviet Union sharply reduced the requirements for a U.S. military presence in Europe. As part of the general downsizing, the 22D Chemical Company was inactivated in Germany on 15 August 1992.

== 22od Chemical Battalion ==
On 16 October 2004, the 22nd Chemical Company was reorganized and reactivated as the 22nd Chemical Battalion at the station it had known as home eighty years before – Edgewood Arsenal, MD which had become a part of Aberdeen Proving Ground, MD.

Concurrent with the activation of the 22nd Chemical Battalion, the Technical Escort Unit (TEU) at Aberdeen was deactivated. The new unit was not designated to receive the honors and lineage associated with TEU. It did however take over all of the complex and diverse functions associated with "Tech Escort." In the view of the Army, of the Chemical Corps, and most importantly in the view of the 22nd Chemical Battalion itself, "America’s Guardians" took over a history and tradition that went back more than 60 years, to Camp Sibert, Alabama.

For several years the battalion was under the newly activated 20th Support Command at Aberdeen Proving Ground, MD, conducting emergency response missions all along the East Coast of the US. EOD members of the unit averaged 150 emergency responses annually including evaluation and recovery of chemical warfare munitions. Throughout this period the unit continued to deploy companies and teams to support Operation Iraqi Freedom and was awarded a Meritorious Unit Commendation for 2005–6; the streamer is embroidered IRAQ 2005–6.

In 2007 the 22nd Chemical Battalion (Technical Escort) was taken under command by the newly activated 48th Chemical Brigade headquartered at Fort Hood, TX while the battalion itself continued to be stationed at Aberdeen. In 2008 Charlie Company was declared a direct support unit to the US Special Operations Command (USSOCOM.) This realignment strengthened command relationships, including deployment of sub teams to Iraq in support of sensitive site exploitation operations. In 2009, 2010, and 2011 tech escort teams from Alpha and Bravo Companies continued to provide support for OIF, particularly in forensic exploitation.

From 2011 through 2013 the battalion supported a variety of other organizations. On 16 October 2012, the "letter" companies (Alpha, etc.) were replaced or re-designated as numbered chemical companies including the 25th, 46th, 59th, and 68th. The 68th Chemical Company won the Sibert Award in 2011 and the 46th Chemical Company won in 2012. This award recognizes the CBRN unit that sustains the highest level of excellence over the year.

In October 2015 orders were issued changing the name of the battalion to the 22nd CBRN Battalion. The technical escort companies were designated as CBRNE Companies (TE). The orders also directed that the technical escort function would leave its home at Edgewood Arsenal/Aberdeen Proving Ground after 71 years. Headquarters Company and the 46th CBRNE Company (TE) moved to Fort Bliss, TX. The 44th CBRN Company (Hazard Response) moved from the 2D Chemical Battalion at Fort Hood to join the 22nd CBRN Battalion at Fort Bliss. The 10th CBRN Company (Hazard Response) remained in place at Fort Carson, CO and transferred to the 22nd. These changes involved more than 100 containers, 160 pieces of rolling stock, and 1094 sensitive items moving to and from the appropriate receiving installations. On 10 June 2016, the 22nd CBRN Battalion cased its colors at Aberdeen Proving Ground and departed for its new home. The 46th CBRNE Company (TE) remained behind to conduct the largest site remediation in the history of the battalion. K Field, an old TEU training site, held an unknown number of munitions and training materials. In less than six weeks the company cleared 2,280 ordnance items ranging from 16-inch shells to 40 mm grenades.

On 23 September 2016, the battalion colors were uncased on the First Armored Division Parade Field at Fort Bliss. On 19 October 2016, the battalion headquarters was dedicated to SFC Kevin P. Jessen who lost his life in service to his country while assigned to the battalion on 5 March 2006. The headquarters became the SFC Kevin P. Jessen Memorial Battalion Area.

Arriving at Fort Bliss with only 125 personnel, the battalion began an aggressive build up and training cycle. Within six months the strength had increased to 320 assigned (325 authorized). To achieve full operational capability the battalion conducted an exercise at Yakima, WA with the German CBRN Defense Force followed by full spectrum WMD missions at Umatilla, UT and at Hammer Federal Training Facility, WA. Exercises at Fort Bliss were conducted, and the soldiers reported being happy with their new station's drier weather and large open spaces for training.

The training cycle was complete in June 2017, almost one hundred years after the 1st Gas regiment set off its Livens projectors in the first American chemical warfare ever conducted. The history of the 22D CBRN Battalion is like a tree with two great roots, one leading back to the need for chemicals in combat in World War I, the other leading back to the need for the safe transport of chemicals in World War II. The soldiers of the battalion have not one but two honored traditions to guide them as they move forward into another century of service.

== Distinctive Insignia ==
On 6 February. 1930 a distinctive unit insignia was approved for the 1st Chemical Company which was stationed at Corazol, in the Panama Canal Zone. The design is rich with heritage, drawing its hexagon shape from the benzene ring which is shown over the crossed retorts of the CWS insignia. The dragon is the same as the dragon on the coat of arms of the 1st Gas Regiment. The green band is in the shape of the Panama Canal symbolizing the 1st Chemical Company's long tenure at that station. The design remained in place when the unit was reorganized 1 April 1931 as the 1st Separate Chemical Company, and again 21 March 1942 as the 1st Chemical Company. It continues today as the insignia for the 22nd Chemical Battalion.

== Campaign participation ==
- World War I: St. Mihiel; Meuse-Argonne; Lorraine 1918
- World War II: American Theater, Streamer without inscription
- Vietnam: Counteroffensive; Counteroffensive, Phase II
- Southwest Asia: Defense of Saudi Arabia; Liberation and Defense of Kuwait; Cease-Fire
- War on Terrorism: Campaigns to be determined

== Decorations ==
- Meritorious Unit Commendation (Army), Streamer embroidered SOUTHWEST ASIA 1990–1991
- Meritorious Unit Commendation (Army), Streamer embroidered IRAQ 2005-2006
