= List of CBRN warfare forces =

Many countries around the world maintain military units that are specifically trained to cope with CBRN (Chemical, Biological, Radiological, Nuclear) threats. Beside this specialized units, most modern armed forces undergo generalized basic CBRN self-defense training for all their personnel.

== Albania ==
- Central Laboratory of the Armed Forces – Military Unit Nr.4010 (Laboratori Qendror i Forcave të Armatosura - Rep. Usht. Nr.4010)

== Algeria ==
- 410th Nuclear, Biological and Chemical Weapons Protection Regiment of the Algerian People's National Army (الفوج 410 للحماية من الاسلحة النووية / البيولوجية / الكيماوية)

== Argentina ==
- Army
  - 601st Chemical Biological Nuclear and Emergency Support Engineers Company (Compañía de Ingenieros de Defensa Quimica Bacteriologica Nuclear y Apoyo a la Emergencia 601)
- Navy
  - Chemical Biological Nuclear-Radiological Defense Department (Departamento Defensa Quimica Bacteriologica Nuclear-Radiológica)

== Australia ==
- Special Operations Engineer Regiment

== Austria ==
- Atomic, Biological, Chemical (ABC) Defense School "Lise Meitner" (Atomar, Biologisch, Chemisch (ABC)-Abwehrschule "Lise Meitner")
- ABC Defense Company - 3rd Headquarters Battalion (ABC-Abwehrkompanie - Stabsbataillon 3)
- ABC Defense Company - 4th Armored Headquarters Battalion (ABC-Abwehrkompanie - Panzerstabsbataillon 4)
- ABC Defense Company - 6th Headquarters Battalion (ABC-Abwehrkompanie - Stabsbataillon 6)
- ABC Defense Company - 7th Headquarters Battalion (ABC-Abwehrkompanie - Stabsbataillon 7)

== Belgium ==
- Competence Center – Engineer Department (Centre de Compétence - Département Génie)
- Chemical Biological Radiological, Nuclear Company – 4th Engineer Battalion (Compagnie Chimique, Biologique, Radiologique, Nucléaire - 4 Bataillon du Génie)

== Belarus ==
- Department of Radiation, Chemical and Biological (RCB) Protection and Ecology ( Упраўленне радыяцыйнай, хімічнай i біялагічнай (РХБ) абароны і экалогіі – Upraŭliennie Radyjacyjnaj, Chimičnaj i Bijalahičnaj (RCB) Abarony i Ekalohii)
- 8th RBC Protection Regiment (8-я полк РХБ абаро́ны - 8-ja Polk RCB Abaróny)

== Bosnia and Herzegovina ==
- Atomic-Biological-Chemical Defense Company (Čete Atomsko-Biološko-Hemijske Odbrane)

== Brazil ==
Army

- 1st Chemical, Biological, Radiological and Nuclear Defense Battalion (1º Batalhão de Defesa Química, Biológica, Radiológica e Nuclear) - in Rio de Janeiro
- CBRN Defense Company - Special Operations Command (Companhia de Defesa Química, Biológica, Radiológica e Nuclear - Comando de Operações Especiais) - in Goiânia
- Chemical, Biological Radiological and Nuclear Defense Institute (Instituto de Defesa Química, Biológica, Radiológica e Nuclear) - in Rio de Janeiro

Navy

- Navy's Nuclear, Biological, Chemical and Radiological Protection and Defense Command (Comando de Proteção e Defesa Nuclear, Biológica, Química e Radiológica da Marinha) - in Rio de Janeiro
- 1st Nuclear, Biological, Chemical and Radiological Protection and Defense Battalion (1º Batalhão de Proteção e Defesa Nuclear, Biológica, Química e Radiológica) - in Iperó
- 2nd Nuclear, Biological, Chemical and Radiological Protection and Defense Battalion (2º Batalhão de Proteção e Defesa Nuclear, Biológica, Química e Radiológica) - in São Gonçalo
- 3rd Nuclear, Biological, Chemical and Radiological Protection and Defense Battalion (3º Batalhão de Proteção e Defesa Nuclear, Biológica, Química e Radiológica) - In Brasília
- Nuclear, Biological, Chemical and Radiological Defense Company – Naval Fusiliers Engineer Battalion (Companhia de Defesa Nuclear, Biológica, Química e Radiológica - Batalhão de Engenharia de Fuzileiros Navais)

== Bulgaria ==
- 38th Nuclear, Chemical and Biological Defense Battalion (38-ми батальон за ядрена, химическа и биологична защита - 38-mi Batal'on za Yadrena, Khimicheska i Biologichna Zashtita)

== Brunei ==
- Chemical, Biological, Radiological and Explosive Company of the Support Battalion

== Canada ==
- Canadian Joint Incident Response Unit
- Canadian Forces Nuclear Biological Chemical School

== China (People's Republic of China) ==
- People's Liberation Army Ground Force Chemical Defense Troops
  - People's Liberation Army Ground Force Chemical Defense Academy (陆军防化学院 - Lùjūn Fáng Huà Xuéyuàn), in Beijing
  - 71st Chemical Defense Brigade - 71st Group Army
  - 72nd Chemical defense brigade - 72nd Group Army
  - 73rd Chemical defense brigade - 73rd Group Army
  - 74th Chemical defense brigade - 74th Group Army
  - 75th Chemical defense brigade - 75th Group Army
  - 76th Chemical defense brigade - 76th Group Army
  - 77th Chemical defense brigade - 77th Group Army
  - 78th Chemical defense brigade - 78th Group Army
  - 79th Chemical defense brigade - 79th Group Army
  - 80th Chemical defense brigade - 80th Group Army
  - 81st Chemical defense brigade - 81st Group Army
  - 82nd Chemical defense brigade - 82nd Group Army
  - 83rd Chemical defense brigade - 83rd Group Army
  - 84th Chemical Defense Brigade - Tibet Military Region
  - 2nd Chemical Defense Regiment - Xinjiang Military Region
- People's Armed Police
  - Engineering/Chemical Defense Detachment, 1st Mobile Contingent
  - Engineering/Chemical Defense Detachment, 2nd Mobile Contingent

== China (Republic of China/"Taiwan") ==
- Detection and Decontamination Battalion, 33rd Chemical Troops Group (33化學兵群偵消營- 33 Huàxué Bīng Qún Zhēn Xiāo Yíng )
- Detection and Decontamination Battalion, 36th Chemical Troops Group (36化學兵群偵消營- 36 Huàxué Bīng Qún Zhēn Xiāo Yíng )
- Detection and Decontamination Battalion, 39th Chemical Troops Group (39化學兵群偵消營- 39 Huàxué Bīng Qún Zhēn Xiāo Yíng )

== Colombia ==
- 80th Disasters Awareness and Prevention Battalion "Brigadier General General Álvaro López Vargas" (Batallón de Atención y Prevención a Desastres No. 80 "Brigadier General Álvaro López Vargas")
  - Nuclear, Biological and Chemical Company (Compañía Nuclear, Biológico y Químico)

== Croatia ==
- Nuclear Biological and Chemical Defense Battalion (Bojna Nuklearno-Biološko-Kemijske Obrane)

== Cuba ==
- Chemical Defense Company (Compañía de Defensa Química)

== Cyprus Republic ==
- Nuclear Biological and Chemical Substances Protection Team (Ομάδα Προστασίας από Πυρηνικές Βιολογικές και Χημικές Ουσίες - Omáda Prostasías apó Pyrinikés Viologikés kai Chimikés Ousíes)

== Czech Republic ==
- 31st Radiological, Chemical and Biological (RCB) Protection Regiment (31. Pluk Radiační, Chemické a Biologické (RCB) Ochrany)
  - 311th RCB Protection Battalion (311. Prapor RCB Ochrany)
  - 312th RCB Protection Battalion (312. Prapor RCB Ochrany)
  - 314th Weapons of Mass Destruction Center (314. Centrum Výstrahy Zbraní Hromadného Ničení)

== Denmark ==
- 3rd Chemical Biological Radiological Nuclear and Construction Battalion (3 Kemisk Biologisk Radiologisk Atomar & Konstruktionsbataljon)

== Finland ==
- CBRN Company – Engineer and Signal Battalion "Satakunta" (Suojelukomppania - Satakunnan Pioneeri- ja Viestipataljoona)

== France ==
- Army
  - 2nd Dragoon Regiment (2e Regiment de Dragons)
  - Nuclear, Biological and Chemical Defense Center (Centre de Défense Nucléaire, Biologique et Chimique)
  - Army Medical Decontamination Unit (Unité Médicale de Décontamination des Armées)
- Navy
  - Nuclear, Biological and Chemical Defense Platoon, Commando Kieffer (Section de Défense Nucléaire, Biologique et Chimique, Commando Kieffer)
- Air Force
  - Nuclear, Biological and Chemical Intervention Platoon, Air Fire Brigade (Section d'intervention Nucléaire, Biologique et Chimique, Pompiers de l'Air)

== Germany ==
- Armed Forces Atomic-Biological-Chemical (ABC) Defense Command (ABC-Abwehrkommando der Bundeswehr)
  - 7th ABC Defense Battalion (ABC-Abwehrbataillon 7)
  - 750th ABC Defense Battalion "Baden" (ABC-Abwehrbataillon 750 "Baden")
  - 906th ABC Defense Battalion (Reserve) (ABC-Abwehrbataillon 906 (Reserve))
  - 907th ABC Defense Battalion (Reserve) (ABC-Abwehrbataillon 907 (Reserve))
- ABC Defense and Legal Protection Tasks School (Schule ABC-Abwehr und Gesetzliche Schutzaufgaben)

== Greece ==
Nuclear Biological Chemical Defense Special Joint Battalion (Ειδικό Διακλαδικό Λόχο Πυρηνικής Βιολογικής Χημικής Άμυνας - Eidikó Diakladikó Lócho Pyrinikís Viologikís Chimikís Ámynas)

== Hungary ==
- 93rd Chemical Protection Battalion "Sándor Petőfi" (MH 93. Petőfi Sándor Vegyivédelmi Zászlóalj)

== India ==
Army

- Faculty of Nuclear Biological Chemical Protection - College of Military Engineering.

Air Force

- Air Force Institute of Nuclear Biological Chemical Protection.

Integrated Defence Staff

- The IDS has established various Joint Service Training Institutes under the Centre for Joint Warfare Studies for training Army, Navy and Air force personnel on the subject of CBRN warfare, Military law, intelligence etc.

National Disaster Response Force

- NDRF has special cbrn companies trained on the guidelines of NDMA.

Central Industrial Security Force

- The NDMA has also trained various units of cisf in first hand cbrn disaster management and hazard disposal.

Central Reserve Police Force

- RAF battalions have special cbrn companies.

Border Security Force

- BSF has also developed cbrn capabilities for the sake of emergency disposals.

== Indonesia ==
- Army Engineers Nuclear, Biological, and Chemical Company (Kompi Zeni Nuklir, Biologi dan Kimia)
- CBRN Team 903rd Det. Satbravo 90 Kopasgat

== Iran ==
Islamic Revolutionary Guard Corps

- Nuclear Command Corps
- 24th Chemical Warfare Brigade "Bessat"

== Israel ==
- 76th Chemical Defense Battalion (76 גדוד הסיוע הכימי - G'dud Siyua Khiymik 76)

== Italy ==
- Joint Nuclear, Biological and Chemical Defense School (Scuola Interforze per la Difesa Nucleare, Biologica e Chimica)
  - Chemical, Biological, Radiological and Nuclear Battalion "Rieti" (Battaglione Chimico, Biologico, Radioattivo e Nucleare "Rieti")
- 7th Chemical, Biological, Radiological and Nuclear Defense Regiment "Cremona" (7° Reggimento Difesa Chimica, Biologica, Radioattiva e Nucleare "Cremona")

== Japan ==
- Ground Self-Defense Force Chemical School (陸上自衛隊化学学校 - Rikujō Jieitai Kagaku Gakkō)
- Central Special Weapons Protection Unit (中央特殊武器防護隊 – Chūō Tokushu Buki Bōgotai)
- one Special Weapons Protection Battalion (特殊武器防護大隊 - Tokushu Buki Bogodaitai) in each Division.
- one Special Weapons Protection Company (特殊武器防護中隊 - Tokushu Buki Bogochūtai) in each independent Brigade.

== Jordan ==
- Chemical Support Unit (حدة دعم الكيميائية - Hdt Dem al-Kymyayyt)

== Kazakhstan ==
- Department of Radiation, Chemical, Biological Protection and Environmental Troops (Радиациялық, Химиялық, Биологиялық Қорғау Және Экологиялық Әскерлері Департаменті - Radïacïyalıq, Xïmïyalıq, Bïologïyalıq Qorğaw Jäne Éékologïyalıq Ääskerleri Departamenti)

== Korea (Democratic People's Republic of Korea/"North Korea") ==
- Nuclear-Chemical Defense Bureau
  - 13th Nuclear-Chemical Defense Battalion (Reserve)
  - 14th Nuclear-Chemical Defense Battalion (Reserve)
  - 15th Nuclear-Chemical Defense Battalion (Reserve)
  - 16th Nuclear-Chemical Defense Battalion (Reserve)
  - 17th Nuclear-Chemical Defense Battalion
  - 18th Nuclear-Chemical Defense Battalion
  - 27th Nuclear-Chemical Defense Battalion (Reserve)
  - 36th Nuclear-Chemical Defense Battalion (Reserve)

== Korea (Republic of Korea/"South Korea") ==
- Army Chemical School (육군화생방학교 – Yuggun Hwasangbang Haggyo)
- 10th Chemical Battalion (제10화생방대대 – je 10 Hwasangbang Daedae)
- 11th Chemical Battalion (제11화생방대대 – je 11 Hwasangbang Daedae)
- 12th Chemical Battalion (제12화생방대대 – je 12 Hwasangbang Daedae)
- 13th Chemical Battalion (제13화생방대대 – je 13 Hwasangbang Daedae)
- 15th Chemical Battalion (제15화생방대대 – je 15 Hwasangbang Daedae)
- 17th Chemical Battalion (제17화생방대대 – je 17 Hwasangbang Daedae)
- 19th Chemical Battalion (제19화생방대대 – je 19 Hwasangbang Daedae)

== Latvia ==
- National Guard Weapons of Mass Destruction Protection Company (Aizsardzības no Masveida Iznīcināšanas Ieročiem Rota)

== Lebanon ==
- Weapons of Mass Destruction Defense Company (سرية الوقاية من اسلحة الدمار الشامل - Siriyat al-Wiqayat min 'as-Lihat al-Damar al-Shshamil)

== Lithuania ==
- Atomic Biological and Chemical Platoon - Engineer Battalion "Juozo Vitkaus" (Atomines Biologines ir Chemines Būrys - "Juozo Vitkaus" Inžinerijos Vatalione)

== Macedonia (Republic of North Macedonia) ==
- Nuclear Biological Chemical Protection Company (Чета за нуклеарна биолошка хемиска одбране - Četa za Nuklearna Biološka Xemiska Odbrana)

== Malaysia ==
- 3rd Chemical, Biological and Nuclear Warfare Division (Peperangan Nuklear, Biologi dan Kimia 3 Divisyen)

== Mexico ==
- Chemical, Biological and Radiological Emergencies Response Group (Grupo de Respuesta de Emergencias Quimicas, Biologicas y Radiologicas)

== Moldova ==
- Independent Chemical Protection Company (Compania Protecţie Chimică Independentă)

== Montenegro ==
- Chemical Biological Radiological Nuclear (CBRN) Defence Platoon of the Infantry Battalion (Вода Xемијско, Биолошко, Радиолошко Нуклеарно Одбрање (ХРБНО)/Пешадијски Батаљон - Voda Hemijsko, Biološko, Radiološko, Nuklearno Odbranje (HRBNO)/Pešadijski Bataljon)

== NATO ==
- Joint Chemical, Biological, Radiological and Nuclear (CBRN) Defense Centre of Excellence
- Combined Joint CBRN Defence Task Force
  - CBRN Joint Assessment Team
  - Multinational CBRN Defence Battalion

== Netherlands ==
- Defense Chemical Biological Radiological Nuclear (CBRN) Center (Defensie Chemisch Biologisch Radiologisch Nucleair (CBRN) Centrum)
  - CBRN Response Unit (CBRN Respons Eenheid)
  - CBRN Training Center (Nationaal Trainingscentrum CBRN)

== New Zealand ==
- E Squadron – 1st New Zealand Special Air Service Regiment

== Norway ==
- Engineers Battalion Chemical Biological Radiological and Nuclear Company (Ingeniørbataljonens CBRN-kompani)

== Peru ==
- Nuclear, Bacteriological and Chemical Defense Department - Army Scientific and Technological Research Center (División de Defensa Nuclear, Bacteriológica y Química - Centro de Investigación Científico Tecnológico del Ejército)

== Philippines ==
- Army
  - Chemical Biological Radiological Nuclear Platoon – Explosive Ordnance Battalion
- Air Force
  - Chemical Biological Radiological Nuclear Team - 710th Special Operations Wing

== Poland ==
- Engineering and Chemical Forces Training Center "General Jakub Jasiński" (Centrum Szkolenia Wojsk Inżynieryjnych i Chemicznych im. gen. Jakuba Jasińskiego)
- 4th Chemical Regiment "Ignacy Mościcki" (4 Pułk Chemiczny im. Ignacego Mościckiego)
- 5th Chemical Regiment "Lieutenant General Leon Berbecki" (5 Pułk Chemiczny im. gen. broni Leona Berbeckiego)
- Armed Forces Epidemiological Response Center (Centrum Reagowania Epidemiologicznego Sił Zbrojnych)

== Portugal ==
- Nuclear, Biological, Chemical and Radiological Defense Company – 1st Engineer Regiment (Companhia de Defesa Nuclear, Biológica, Química e Radiológica - Regimento de Engenharia N.º1)
- Chemical, Biological, Radiological and Nuclear Defense Flight - Air Force Survival Training Center (Esquadrilha de Defesa Nuclear, Radiológica, Biológica e Química - Centro de Treino de Sobrevivência da Força Aérea)

== Romania ==
- Nuclear, Biological and Chemical (NBC) Defense Training Base (Baza de Instruire pentrul Apărare Nucleară, Biologică şi Chimică (NBC))
- 49th NBC Defense Battalion "Argeş" (Batalionului 49 Apãrare NBC "Argeş")
- 72nd NBC Defense Battalion "Black Voivode" (Batalionului 72 Apãrare NBC "Negru Vodă")
- 202nd NBC Defense Battalion "General Gheorghe Teleman" (Batalionului 202 Apãrare NBC "Gen. Gheorghe Teleman")

== Russian Federation ==
- Russian NBC Protection Troops (Войска́ радиацио́нной, хими́ческой и биологи́ческой (РХБ) защи́ты Вооружённых сил Росси́йской Федера́ции - Voyská Radiatsiónnoy, Khimícheskoy i Biologícheskoy (RKhB) Zashchíty Vooruzhonnykh sil Rossíyskoy Federátsii)
  - 1st Mobile RCB Protection Brigade (1-я мобильная бригада РХБ защиты -1-ya Mobil'naya Brigada RKhB Zashchity)
  - 16th Independent RCB Protection Brigade "Khingansk" (16-я отдельная Хинганская бригада РХБ защиты - 16-ya Otdel'naya Khinganskaya Brigada RKHB Zashchity)
  - 27th Independent RCB Protection Brigade (27-я отдельная бригада РХБ защиты - 27-ya Otdel'naya Brigada RKhB Zashchity)
  - 28th Independent RCB Protection Brigade (28-я отдельная бригада РХБ защиты - 28-ya Otdel'naya Brigada RKhB Zashchity)
  - 29th Independent RCB Protection Brigade "Colonel-General "V.K. Pikalov" (29-я отдельная бригада РХБ защиты имени генерал-полковника В. К. Пикалова - 29-ya Otdel'naya Brigada RKhB Zashchity imeni general-polkovnika V. K. Pikalova)
  - 2nd RCB Protection Regiment (2-й полк РХБ защиты - 2-y Polk RKhB Zashchity)
  - 4th RCB Protection Regiment (4-й полк РХБ защиты - 4-y Polk RKhB Zashchity)
  - 6th RCB Protection Regiment (6-й полк РХБ защиты - 6-y Polk RKhB Zashchity)
  - 9th RCB Protection, Marking and Reconnaissance Regiment (9-й полк РХБ защиты, засечки и разведки - 9-y Polk RKHB Zashchity, Zasechki i Razvedki)
  - 10th RCB Protection Regiment (10-й полк РХБ защиты - 10-y Polk RKhB Zashchity)
  - 19th RCB Protection Regiment (19-й полк РХБ защиты - 19-y Polk RKhB Zashchity)
  - 20th RCB Protection Regiment (20-й полк РХБ защиты - 20-y Polk RKhB Zashchity)
  - 25th RCB Protection Regiment (25-й полк РХБ защиты - 25-y Polk RKhB Zashchity)
  - 26th RCB Protection Regiment (26-й полк РХБ защиты - 26-y Polk RKhB Zashchity)
  - 35th RCB Protection Regiment (35-й полк РХБ защиты - 35-y Polk RKhB Zashchity)
  - 39th RCB Protection Regiment (39-й полк РХБ защиты - 39-y Polk RKhB Zashchity)
  - 40th RCB Protection Regiment (40-й полк РХБ защиты - 40-y Polk RKhB Zashchity)
  - 282nd RCB Military Training Center (282-й учебный центр войск РХБ защиты - 282-y Uchebnyy Tsentr Voysk RKhB Zashchity)
  - 345th Operational Coordination Center of the Unified System for Identifying and Assessing the Scale of the Use of Weapons of Mass Destruction and Accidents at RCB Hazardous Facilities (345-й оперативно-координационный центр единой системы выявления и оценки масштабов применения оружия массового поражения и аварий на RKhB опасных объектах - 345-y Operativno-Koordinatsionnyy Tsentr Yedinoy Sistemy Vyyavleniya i Otsenki Masshtabov Primeneniya Oruzhiya Massovogo Porazheniya i Avariy na RKhB opasnykh ob"yektakh)
  - Military Academy of RCB Protection "Marshal of the Soviet Union Semën Konstantinovič Timošenko" (Военная академия РХБ защиты имени Маршала Советского Союза Семёна Константиновича Тимошенко - Voyennaya Akademiya RKhB Zashchity imeni Marshala Sovetskogo Soyuza Semyon Konstantinovich Timoshenko)
  - one RCB Protection Company in each Brigade
- Navy
  - Department of RCB Protection (Кафедра РХБ защиты - Kafedra RKHB Zashchity)
- National Guard
  - 4th Independent RCB Protection Company (4-я отдельная рота РХБ защиты - 4-ya Otdel'naya Rota RKHB Zashchity)
  - 6th Independent RCB Protection Company (6-я отдельная рота РХБ защиты - 6-ya Otdel'naya Rota RKHB Zashchity)

== Saudi Arabia ==
- Weapons of Mass Destruction Defense School (مدرسة الوقاية من أسلحة الدمار الشامل - Madrasat al-Wiqayat min 'as-Lihat al-Damar al-Shshamil)

== Serbia ==
- Atomic-Biological-Chemical (ABC) Service (Атомско-биолошко-хемијска (АБХ) служба - Atomsko-Biološko-Hemijska (ABH) Služba)
  - ABC Defense Center (Центар АБХ одбране - Centar ABH Odbrane)
  - 246th ABC Defense Battalion (246. батаљон АБХ одбране - 46. Bataljon ABH Odbrane)

== Singapore ==
- Chemical, Biological, Radiological and Explosives Defence Group

== Slovakia ==
- Radiation, Chemical and Biological Protection Battalion (Prápor Radiačnej, Chemickej a Biologickej Ochrany)

== Slovenia ==
- 18th Nuclear, Radiological, Chemical and Biological Defense Battalion (18. Bataljon za Jedrsko, Radiološko, Kemično in Biološko Obrambo) (Note: Two companies, attached one each to the 1st and 72nd Mechanized Infantry Brigade. International Institute for Strategic Studies (2021). The Military Balance. Taylor & Francis. p. 143. ISBN 9781032012278.)

== South Africa ==
- Chemical Biological Warfare Wing - 7 Medical Battalion Group

== Spain ==
- 1st Nuclear Biological Chemical (NBC) Regiment "Valencia" (Regimento de Defensa Nuclear Biologica Quimica (NBQ) "Valencia" n° 1)
- NBC Defense Military School (Escuela Militar de Defensa NBQ)
- Epidemic Investigation Rapid Deployment Team - Central Defense Hospital "Gómez Ulla" (Equipo Desplegable Rápido de Investigación de Brotes - Hospital Central de la Defensa "Gómez Ulla")
- one NBC Defense Company in each brigade

== Sri Lanka ==
- Army
  - 14th Chemical Biological Radiology and Nuclear (CBRN) Regiment (14 වන රසායනික ජීව විද්‍යාත්මක විකිරණශීලී හා න්‍යෂ්ටික රෙජිමේන්තුව - 14 Vana Rasāyanika Jīva Vidyātmaka Vikiraṇaśīlī hā Nyaṣṭika Rejimēntuva)
- Navy
  - Naval Nuclear Biological Chemical Defense School (නාවික න්‍යෂ්ටික ජීව විද්‍යාත්මක රසායනික ආරක්ෂක පාසල - Nāvika Nyaṣṭika Jīva Vidyātmaka Rasāyanika Ārakṣaka Pāsala)
- Air Force
  - No.49 CBRN and Explosive Wing (රසායනික ජීව විකිරණ හා න්‍යෂ්ටික පුපුරණ ද්‍රව්‍ය පක්‍ෂාංගය - Rasāyanika Jīva Vikiraṇa hā Nyaṣṭika Pupuraṇa Dravya Pakṣāṁgaya)

== Sweden ==
- Total Defense Protection Center (Note: This is the literal english translation of the unit name, but "National CBRN Defence Centre" is the name officially used in English by the Swedish Armed Forces instead. See pag.64, http://www.2d.lviv.ua/wp-content/uploads/2014/07/Grafisk_identitet_v1.3_130916.pdf) (Totalförsvarets Skyddscentrum)

== Switzerland ==
- Atomic, Biological, Chemical (ABC), De-mining and Unexploded Ordnance Disposal Competence Center (Kompetenzzentrum Atomar, Biologisch, Chemisch (ABC), Kampfmittelbeseitigung und Minenräumung - Centre de Compétences Nucléaire, Biologique, Chimique (NBC), Dé-minage et d'Elimination des Munitions non Explosées - Centro di Competenza Nucleare, Biologico Chimico (NBC), Eliminazione di Munizioni Inesplose e Sminamento)
- 77th ABC Defense School (ABC-Abwehr Schule 77 - École de Défense NBC 77 - Scuola di Difesa NBC 77)
- 10th ABC Defense Battalion (ABC-Abwehrbataillon 10 - Bataillon de Défense NBC 10 - Battaglione di Difesa NBC 10)
- 20th ABC Defense Battalion (ABC-Abwehrbataillon 20 - Bataillon de Defense NBC 20 - Battaglione di Difesa NBC 10)
- ABC Defense Intervention detachment (ABC-Abwehr Bereitschaft Detachment- Détachement d'intervention de Défense NBC - Distaccamento d'Intervento di Difesa NBC)

== Tajikistan ==
- 74th Radiation Chemical and Biological Company (74-я Рота Радиацио́нной, Хими́ческой и Биологи́ческой - 74—ya Radiatsiónnoy, Khimícheskoy i Biologícheskoy)

== Thailand ==
- Royal Thai Army Chemical Department (RTACD)
- Naval Science Department (NSD)
- Research and Development Centre for Space and Aeronautical Science and Technology, RTAF (RDC)

== Turkey ==
- Chemical Biological Radiological Nuclear (CBRN) Defense Battalion (Kimyasal Biyolojik Radyolojik Nükleer (KBRN) Savunma Tabur), including:
  - CBRN Defense Special Response Unit (KBRN Savunma Özel Müdahale Birliği)
- CBRN School and Training Center Command (KBRN Okul ve Eğitim Merkezi)

== Ukraine ==
- 1st NPP Battalion
- 3rd NPP Battalion
- 4th NPP Battalion
- 5th NPP Battalion
- 704th Independent Radiation, Chemical, Biological (RCB) Protection Brigade (704-й окремий полк радіаційного, хімічного, біологічного (РХБ) захисту - 704-y Okremyy Polk Radiatsiynoho, Khimichnoho, Biolohichnoho (RKhB) Zakhystu)
- 536th Central Base of Repair and Storage (RCB Protection Weapons) (536-й центральна база ремонту і зберігання (озброєння РХБ захисту) - 536-y Tsentralʹna Baza Remontu i Zberihannya (Ozbroyennya RKhB Zakhystu))
- one RCB Protection Platoon in each Brigade

== United Kingdom ==
Inter-services

- Defense Chemical Biological Radiological and Nuclear Centre

Army

- 28 Engineer Regiment, Royal Engineers including:
  - "Falcon" Squadron - Royal Tank Regiment

Navy

- Royal Marines
  - Zulu Company, 45 Commando

Air Force

- No. 27 Squadron RAF Regiment

== United States ==
Army

- Chemical Corps
- Army Chemical, Biological, Radiological and Nuclear School
  - 84th Chemical Battalion (Training)
- 23rd Chemical Battalion
- 20th Chemical Biological Radiological Nuclear and Explosives (CBRN) Command
  - 48th Chemical Brigade
    - 2nd Chemical Battalion
    - 22nd Chemical Battalion (Technical Escort)
    - 83rd Chemical Battalion
    - 110th Chemical Battalion (Technical Escort)
  - Chemical, Biological, Radiological, Nuclear, and Explosives Analytical and Remediation Activity

Army Reserve

- 415th Chemical Brigade (Army Reserve)
  - 92nd Chemical Battalion (Army Reserve)
  - 457th Chemical Battalion (Army Reserve)
  - 479th Chemical Battalion (Army Reserve)
  - 485th Chemical Battalion (Army Reserve)
  - 490th Chemical Battalion (Army Reserve)
- 455th Chemical Brigade (Army Reserve)
  - 450th Chemical Battalion (Army Reserve)
  - 453rd Chemical Battalion (Army Reserve)
  - 468th Chemical Battalion (Army Reserve)
  - 472nd Chemical Battalion (Army Reserve)

Army National Guard

- 31st Chemical Biological Radiological and Nuclear Brigade (Alabama NG)
  - 145th Chemical Battalion (Alabama NG)
  - 151st Chemical Battalion (Alabama NG)
- 44th Chemical Battalion (Illinois NG)
- 103rd Chemical Battalion (Kentucky NG)
- 126th Chemical Battalion (Nebraska NG)
- 155th Chemical Battalion (Ohio NG)
- 420th Chemical Battalion (Washington NG)
- Independent Companies
  - 50th Chemical Company (New Jersey NG)
  - 108th Chemical Company (South Carolina NG)
  - 128th Chemical Company (Pennsylvania NG)
  - 138th Chemical Company (Georgia NG)
  - 140th Chemical Company (California NG)
  - 222nd Chemical Company (New York NG)
  - 229th Chemical Company (Virginia NG)
  - 231st Chemical Company (Maryland NG)
  - 272nd Chemical Company (Massachusetts NG)
  - 434th Chemical Company (Minnesota NG)
  - 436th Chemical Company (Texas NG)
  - 438th Chemical Company (Indiana NG)
  - 457th Chemical Company (Wisconsin NG)
  - 460th Chemical Company (Michigan NG)
  - 482nd Chemical Company (Puerto Rico NG)
  - 631st Chemical Company (Montana NG)
  - 704th Chemical Company (Minnesota NG)

Navy

- Explosive Ordnance Disposal Group One
- Explosive Ordnance Disposal Group Two

Marines

- Chemical Biological Incident Response Force

Air Force

- 368th Training Squadron "Vikings"

Coast Guard

- Maritime Security Response Team (MSRT)

Joint Army National Guard and Air National Guard

- CBRN and High Yield Explosives Enhanced Response Force Packages (CERFP)
  - 6th CERFP (Texas NG)
  - 9th CERFP (California NG)
  - 19th CERFP (Indiana NG)
  - 34th CERFP (Virginia NG)
  - 35th CERFP (West Virginia NG)
  - 55th CERFP (Minnesota NG)
  - 102nd CERFP (Oregon NG)
  - 781st CERFP (Georgia NG)
  - Alabama National Guard CERFP
  - Colorado National Guard CERFP
  - Florida National Guard CERFP
  - Hawaii National Guard CERFP
  - Illinois National Guard CERFP
  - Kentucky National Guard CERFP
  - Louisiana National Guard CERFP
  - Nebraska National Guard CERFP
  - Nevada National Guard CERFP
  - New England CERFP (Maine, New Hampshire, Rhode Island and Vermont National Guard)
  - New York National Guard CERFP
  - Puerto Rico National Guard CERFP
  - Utah National Guard CERFP

== Uruguay ==
- Chemical, Biological, Radiological and Nuclear Group (Grupo Quimico, Biologico, Radiologico y Nuclear)

== Uzbekistan ==
- Training Center for Experts on Chemical, Biological, Radiation Safety

== Vietnam ==
- Chemical Arms (Binh chủng Hóa học)
  - Military Environmental Chemistry Institute (Viện Hóa học-Môi trường Quân sự)
  - Chemicals and Nuclear radiation Incident Response Center, North (Trung tâm Ứng phó sự cố hóa học, phóng xạ hạt nhân miền Bắc)
  - Chemicals and Nuclear radiation Incident Response Center, Central(Trung tâm Ứng phó sự cố hóa học, phóng xạ hạt nhân miền Trung)
  - Chemicals and Nuclear radiation Incident Response Center, South(Trung tâm Ứng phó sự cố hóa học, phóng xạ hạt nhân miền Nam)

== See also ==
- List of cyber warfare forces
- List of marines and similar forces
- List of mountain warfare forces
- List of paratrooper forces
