= Speicher =

Speicher may refer to:

- Speicher (surname)
- Speicher, Switzerland in the canton of Appenzell Ausserrhoden.
  - Speicher railway station, a station of Appenzell Railways in Speicher
- Speicher, Germany in the district Bitburg-Prüm, Rhineland-Palatinate
- Speicher (Verbandsgemeinde), a collective municipality in Bitburg-Prüm, Rhineland-Palatinate, Germany
- Speicher massacre, second deadliest act of terrorism in history
- Camp Speicher, an airfield in Iraq
