= 76th Operational Response Command =

76th Operational Response Command 76th Infantry Division
- 76th Infantry Division shoulder sleeve insignia
- Active: 5 August 1917–14 January 1919 (National Army); 24 June 1921–31 August 1945 (Organized Reserves); 7 October 1946–1 May 1959 (Organized Reserve Corps); 1 May 1959–15 Novmember 1996 (76th Training Division); 1 February 2013–present (76th ORC)
- Country: United States
- Branch: United States Army Reserve
- Type: Operational Response
- Size: Command
- Part of: United States Army Reserve Command
- Headquarters: Salt Lake City, Utah
- Nicknames: "Onaway Division," "Liberty Bell Division"
- Engagements: World War I; World War II; Rhineland; Ardennes-Alsace; Central Europe

Commanders
- Current: MG Dean P. Thompson
- Command Sergeant Major: CSM Jason E. Goodman

Insignia
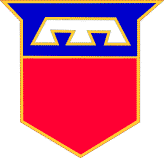
- Distinctive unit insignia

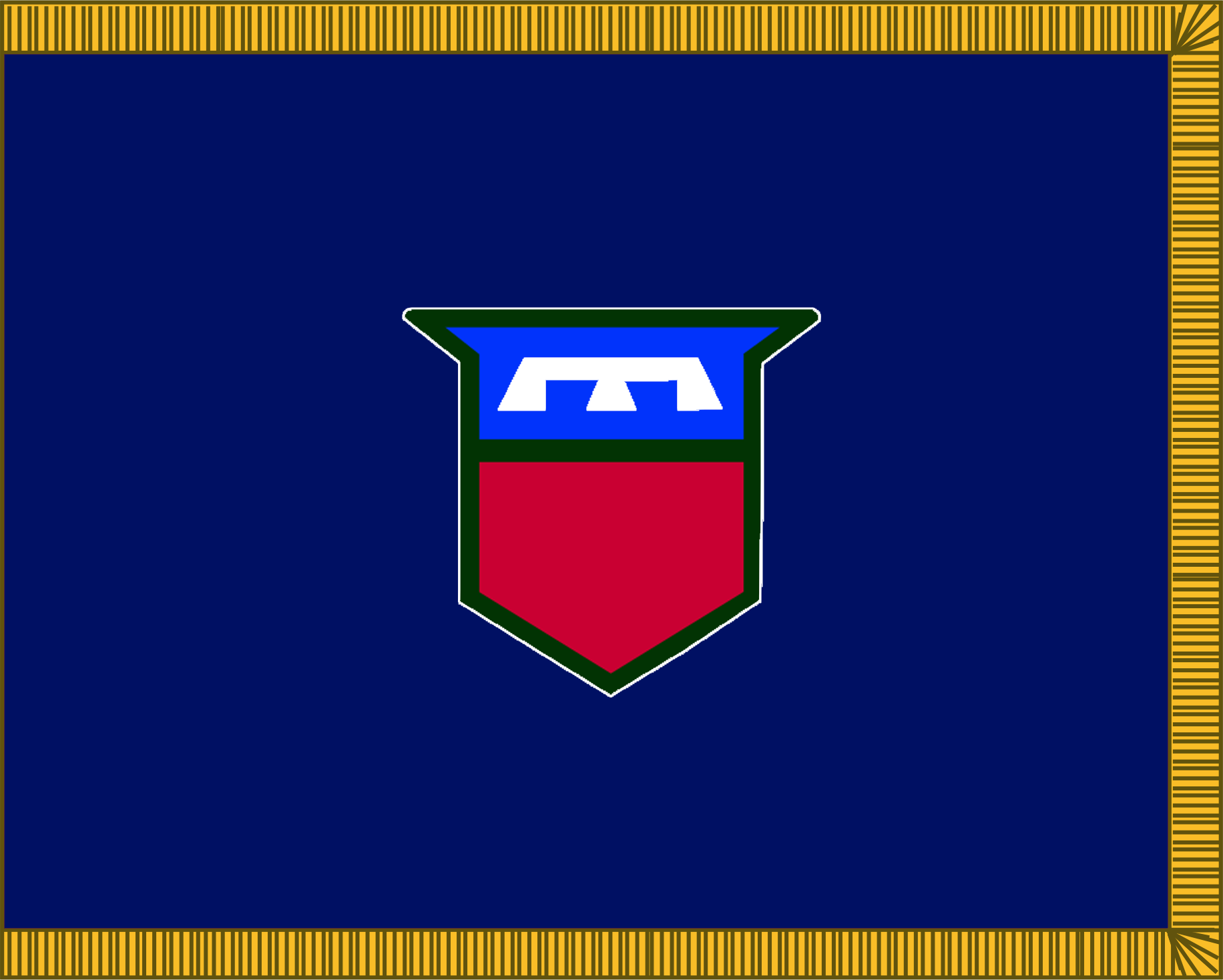
- 76th Operational Response Command Flag

The 76th Operational Response Command (76 ORC) is a military formation of the United States Army Reserve. It draws the majority of its history from the 76th Infantry Division which served during the First World War, Second World War and the 1950s. It then became a training division. It was inactivated in 1996 and was reconstituted as the 76th U.S. Army Reserve Operational Readiness Command in 2013.

== History ==
=== World War I ===
The War Department established the 76th Division on 5 August 1917, to be organized at Camp Devens, Ayer, Massachusetts; drafts anticipated for 1917, from Connecticut, Maine, Massachusetts, New Hampshire, New York, Rhode Island, and Vermont, furnished the division's first enlisted personnel. On 13 August, the organization of the division headquarters is directed, and its commissioned personnel are ordered to report on or before 15 August. On 16 August, the commander of Camp Devens was directed to organize the division in accordance with the tables of organization of 8 August 1917. On 25 August, Major General Harry F. Hodges assumed command of the division, and the program for the movement of Selective Service men to camps is announced. The 76th Division was nicknamed the "Liberty Bell" Division due to Independence Day being July 4, 1776.

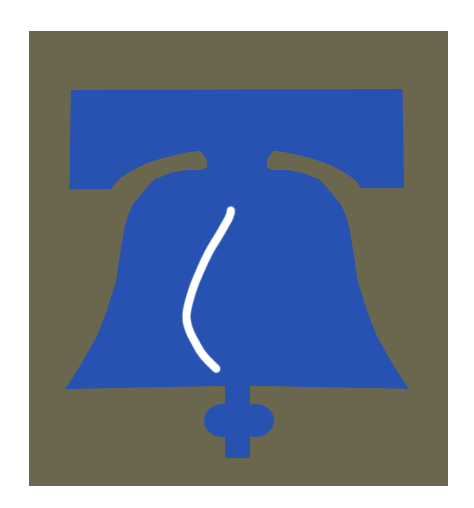
76th "Liberty Bell" Division WWI Patch

During the last week in August 1917, organization begins from a cadre of officers and men of the Regular Army, and from Officers' Reserve Corps and National Army officers of the First Officers Training Camps. From 5–10 September, the initial draft of 2,000 Selective Service men arrived at camp, and from 19 to 24 September, an additional 17,500 arrived. In September, systematic training began. From 3–8 October, the last drafts of 1917 furnished the camp with 17,500 men. On 31 October, the 76th Division numbered about 22,000 personnel. During the winter, fresh drafts and transfers arrived, but are exceeded by the losses which include, in November alone, 3,600, the majority of whom were transferred to the 82nd Division. On 31 March 1918, the 76th Division aggregated less than one-half the authorized strength. In April and June 1918, new drafts and transfers completed the division.

On 28 June, the division's Advance Detachment sailed from New York and arrived on 10 July at Liverpool, United Kingdom. On 14 July 1918, the 76th Division, less the 151st Field Artillery Brigade, 301st Engineers and Train, and 301st Field Signal Battalion, was designated as a depot division, reduced to a cadre strength and used to receive, equip, train, and forward replacements and hospital returnees to combat units of the American Expeditionary Forces.

- Overseas: August 1918
- Commanders: Maj. Gen. H. F. Hodges (5 August 1917), Brig. Gen. William Weigel (28 November 1917), Maj. Gen. H. F. Hodges (13 February 1918)
- Inactivated: May 1919

==== Order of battle ====
- Headquarters, 76th Division
- 151st Infantry Brigade
  - 301st Infantry Regiment
  - 302nd Infantry Regiment
  - 302nd Machine Gun Battalion
- 152nd Infantry Brigade
  - 303rd Infantry Regiment
  - 304th Infantry Regiment
  - 303rd Machine Gun Battalion
- 151st Field Artillery Brigade
  - 301st Field Artillery Regiment (75 mm)
  - 302nd Field Artillery Regiment (4.7 inch)
  - 303rd Field Artillery Regiment (155 mm)
  - 301st Trench Mortar Battery
- 301st Machine Gun Battalion
- 301st Engineer Regiment
- 301st Field Signal Battalion
- Headquarters Troop, 76th Division
- 301st Train Headquarters and Military Police
  - 301st Ammunition Train
  - 301st Supply Train
  - 301st Engineer Train
  - 301st Sanitary Train
    - 301st-304th Ambulance Companies and Field Hospitals

=== Interwar period ===
The 76th Division was reconstituted in the Organized Reserve on 24 June 1921, allotted to the First Corps Area, and assigned to the XI Corps. The division was further allotted to the states of Connecticut and Rhode Island as its home area. Headquarters of the “Onaway” Division was organized on 1 September 1921 at the State Armory in Hartford, Connecticut. The headquarters was subsequently relocated on 18 January 1928 to Room 411, Donaghue Building at 535 Main Street in Hartford, and finally to the Federal Building at Church and High Streets on 28 February 1933, and remained there until activated for World War II. The 373rd-375th Infantry Regiments, part of the provisional 94th Division in World War I which was intended to be composed of Puerto Rican soldiers, were allotted to Puerto Rico's 211th Infantry Brigade as part of a hypothetical division which was never organized, and the unorganized 376th Infantry was assigned to the 94th Division, which was allotted to Massachusetts. To flesh out the rest of the 94th Division's infantry, the 301st and 302nd Infantry Regiments (part of the 76th Division in World War I) were assigned, along with the newly constituted 419th Infantry. The 76th Division retained only its World War I-era 304th Infantry, taking the 385th Infantry from the 97th Division and adding the newly constituted 417th and 418th Infantry Regiments, while the 97th Division took the 76th Division's 303rd Infantry and retained the 386th-388th Infantry Regiments.

Upon reorganization after the Great War, the 76th Division was slow to build its strength. By 1926, the division was still only about 67 percent complete with 605 officers assigned out of 905 authorized. This slow progression was due, in part, to the small number of ROTC programs located in the First Corps Area from which the division could draw its officers. To maintain communications with the officers of the division, the division headquarters published a newsletter named “The Spirit of ‘76” in keeping with division's numerical designation and the military, geographical, and historical background of the region from which it drew its personnel. The newsletter informed the division's members of such things as when and where the inactive training sessions were to be held, what the division's summer training quotas were, where the camps were to be held, and which units would be assigned to help conduct the Citizens Military Training Camps (CMTC).

The designated mobilization and training station for the division was Camp Devens, Massachusetts, the location where much of the 76th Division's training activities occurred in the interwar years. For the few summers when it was called to duty for training as a unit, the headquarters often trained with the staff of the 9th Division's 18th Infantry Brigade at Camp Devens. The summer training for the personnel assigned to the division headquarters was varied and included staff training, branch-specific training, and command post exercises (CPXs). For several summers, however, the division headquarters conducted its summer training at the Connecticut Agricultural College in Storrs, Connecticut. The camp at Storrs was also designated the “Special Officers Camp” and consisted of training for unassigned officers, officers who could not attend training with their assigned units, and basic training for recent ROTC and CMTC commissionees. The division's subordinate units trained all over the First Corps Area. Divisional infantry regiments, for example, held their summer training primarily with the units of the 18th Infantry Brigade at Camp Devens, Fort Ethan Allen, Vermont, and Fort Adams, Rhode Island. Other units, such as the special troops, artillery, engineers, aviation, medical, and quartermaster, trained at various posts in the First, Second, and Third Corps Areas, usually with Regular Army units of the same branch. For example, the 301st Engineer Regiment usually trained with the 1st Engineer Regiment at Fort DuPont, Delaware; the 301st Medical Regiment trained with the 1st Medical Regiment at Carlisle Barracks, Pennsylvania; and the 301st Observation Squadron trained with the 5th Observation Squadron at Mitchel Field, New York. In addition to the unit training camps, the infantry regiments of the division rotated the responsibility for conducting the CMTC held at Camp Devens each year.

On a number of occasions, the 76th Division participated in First Corps Area or First Army CPXs in conjunction with other Regular Army, National Guard, and Organized Reserve units. These training events gave division staff officers an opportunity to practice the roles they would be expected to perform in the event the division was mobilized. Unlike the Regular and Guard units in the First Corps Area, the 76th Division did not participate in the First Corps Area maneuvers and the First Army maneuvers of 1935, 1939, and 1940 as an organized unit due to lack of enlisted personnel and equipment. Instead, the officers and a few enlisted reservists were assigned to Regular and Guard units to fill vacant slots and bring the units up to war strength for the exercises. Additionally, some were assigned duties as umpires or support personnel.

=== World War II ===
- Ordered into active military service: 15 June 1942 at Fort George G. Meade, Maryland
- Overseas: 10 December 1944
- Campaigns: Ardennes-Alsace, Rhineland, Central Europe
- Days of combat: 107
- Distinguished Unit Citations: 2
- Awards: MH-2; DSC-13; DSM-1; SS-176; LM-5; SM-19; BSM-1,312; AM-58
- Commanders: Maj. Gen. Emil F. Reinhardt (June–December 1942), Maj. Gen. William R. Schmidt (December 1942 – July 1945), Brig. Gen. Henry C. Evans (August 1945 to inactivation)
- Inactivated: 31 August 1945 in Europe

==== Mobilization ====
Before Organized Reserve infantry divisions were ordered into active military service, they were reorganized on paper as "triangular" divisions under the 1940 tables of organization. The headquarters companies of the two infantry brigades were consolidated into the division's cavalry reconnaissance troop, and one infantry regiment was removed by inactivation. The field artillery brigade headquarters and headquarters battery became the headquarters and headquarters battery of the division artillery. Its three field artillery regiments were reorganized into four battalions; one battalion was taken from each of the two 75 mm gun regiments to form two 105 mm howitzer battalions, the brigade's ammunition train was reorganized as the third 105 mm howitzer battalion, and the 155 mm howitzer battalion was formed from the 155 mm howitzer regiment. The engineer, medical, and quartermaster regiments were reorganized into battalions. In 1942, divisional quartermaster battalions were split into ordnance light maintenance companies and quartermaster companies, and the division's headquarters and military police company, which had previously been a combined unit, was split.

==== Division organization ====
The division consisted of the following units:

76th Infantry Division organization (click to enlarge)

- 76th Infantry Division
  - 76th Infantry Division Headquarters
  - 76th Cavalry Reconnaissance Troop (Mechanized) (M3 scout cars and then M8 Greyhound armored cars)
  - 304th Infantry Regiment
    - Headquarters and Headquarters Company
    - 3× Infantry battalions
      - each battalion consists of: 1× Headquarters and Headquarters Company, 3× Rifle companies, 1× Heavy Weapons Company
    - Cannon Company (T12 Gun Motor Carriages and T19 Howitzer Motor Carriages, later replaced by either M3 105mm towed howitzers or M7 Priest self propelled howitzers)
    - Anti-Tank Company (M3 37mm anti-tank guns, which were replaced by 1944 with M1 57mm anti-tank guns)
    - Service Company
  - 385th Infantry Regiment
    - same organization as 304th Infantry Regiment
  - 417th Infantry Regiment
    - same organization as 304th Infantry Regiment
  - 76th Infantry Division Artillery
    - Headquarters and Headquarters Battery
    - 302nd Field Artillery Battalion
      - Headquarters and Headquarters Battery
      - 3× Batteries (M2 105mm towed howitzers)
      - Service Battery
    - 355th Field Artillery Battalion
      - same organization as 302nd Field Artillery Battalion
    - 364th Field Artillery Battalion
      - Headquarters and Headquarters Battery
      - 3× Batteries (M1 155mm towed howitzers)
      - Service Battery
    - 901st Field Artillery Battalion
      - same organization as 302nd Field Artillery Battalion
  - Headquarters Special Troops
    - Headquarters Company, 76th Infantry Division
    - 76th Signal Company
    - 76th Quartermaster Company
    - 776th Ordnance Light Maintenance Company
    - Military Police Platoon
    - 76th Infantry Division Band (attached)
  - 301st Engineer Combat Battalion
    - Headquarters and Headquarters and Service Company
    - 3× Engineer combat companies
  - 301st Medical Battalion
    - Headquarters and Headquarters Detachment
    - 3× Collecting companies
    - Clearing Company

==== Training ====
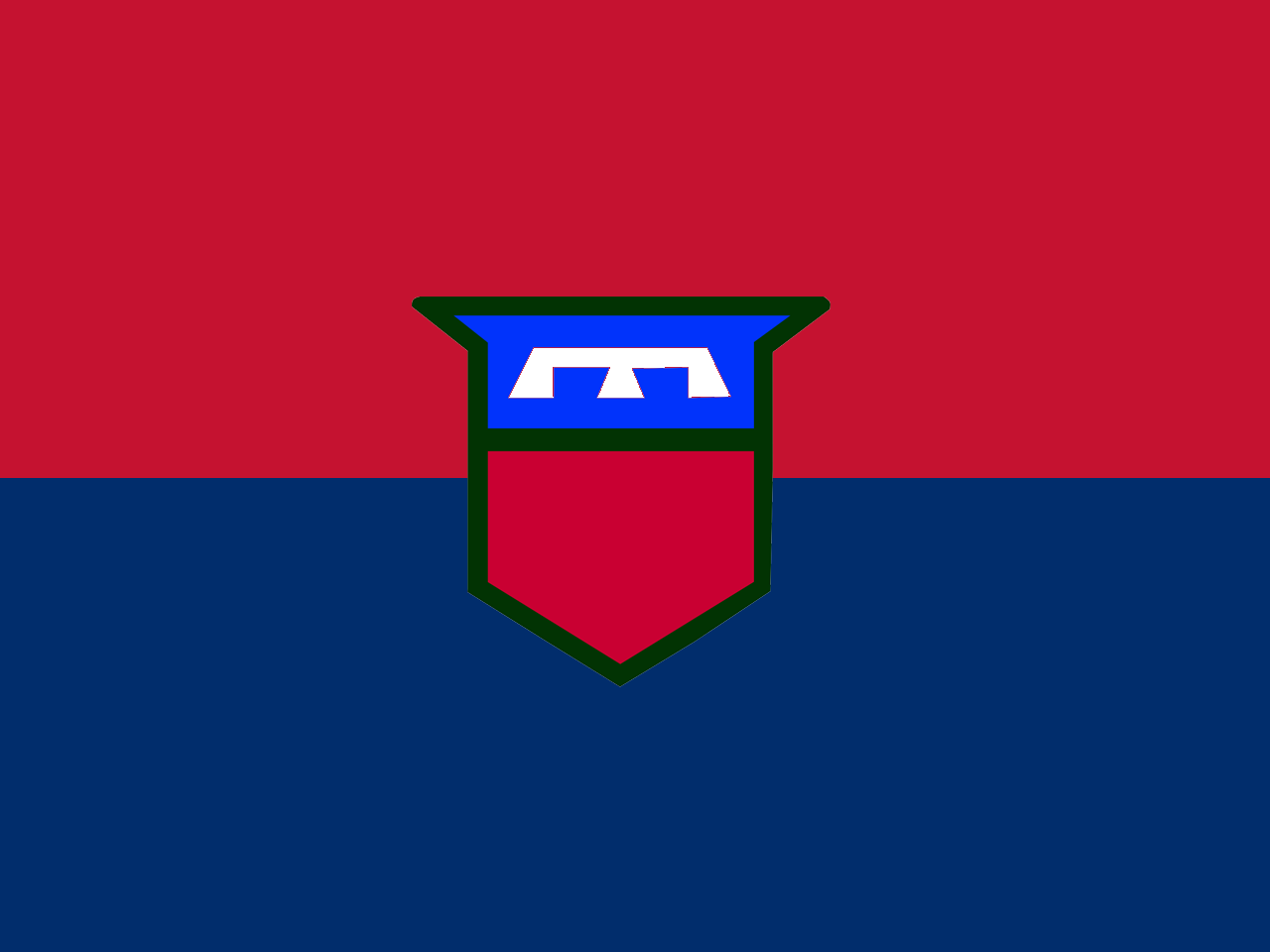
Flag of the United States Army 76th Infantry Division

The 76th Infantry Division was ordered into active military service on 15 June 1942 around a cadre of officers and men from the 1st Infantry Division. After a period of service as a replacement division that held and processed men for assignment to other units or overseas from October 1942 to March 1943, intensive training began on 12 April 1943. This was followed by advanced training in July 1943 at A.P. Hill Military Reservation near Fredericksburg, Virginia. Winter training started in September 1943 at Camp McCoy, Wisconsin. (Skis, snowshoes, toboggans, snow tractors, snow goggles, winter camouflage suits, Eskimo parkas, etc.) Simultaneously, an advanced training group moved in November 1943 to northern Michigan near Watersmeet. Winter training experts from the Mountain Training Center at Camp Hale, Colorado gave a special training program. Additional winter training began at Ottawa National Forest near Watersmeet on 19 February 1944. During this training, temperatures dropped to −28 °F (−33 °C).

Four exercises were conducted during which the 385th Infantry Regiment (headquartered in Pori, Michigan, opposed the division as an enemy force.

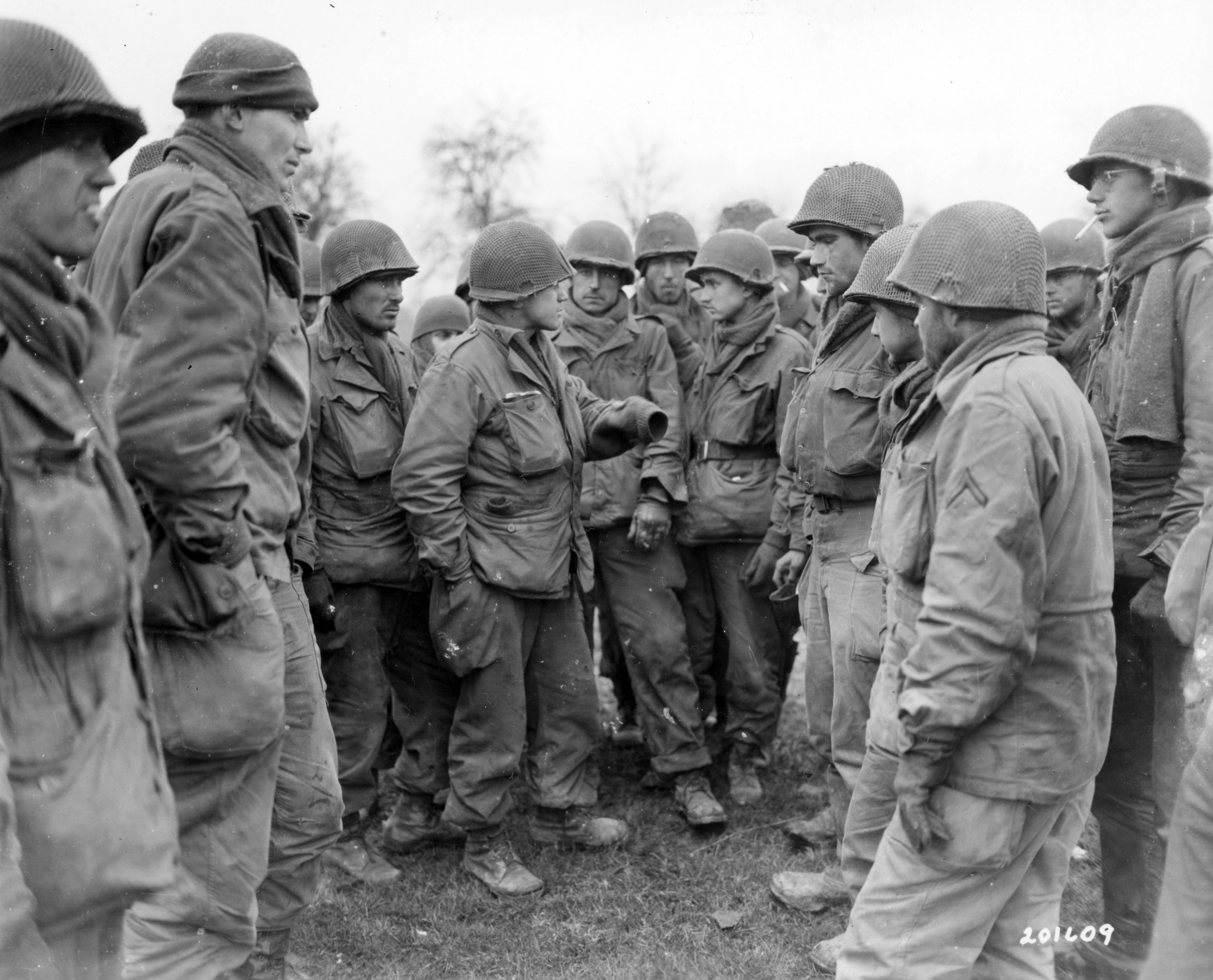
A lieutenant of the 385th Infantry Regiment of 76th Infantry Division gives a briefing to subordinate soldiers near Speicher (6 March 1945).

On 12 March 1944, the division returned to Camp McCoy. 7,000 troops, mainly infantry, were taken from the 76th from April to September 1944 to build up forces for the impending invasion of France (D-Day); the division was replenished by men diverted from the Army Specialized Training Program, aviation cadets, men from disbanded antiaircraft and tank destroyer units, and men who were allowed to volunteer for the infantry from other branches of the Army. In November 1944, trains headed to Camp Myles Standish in Taunton, Massachusetts for staging before transport to Europe.

On Thanksgiving Day 1944, three transports sailed from Boston Port of Embarkation to Europe. The 304th Infantry plus a division headquarters party sailed on the SS Brazil. The 304th reached Southampton, England on 4 December 1944. The 385th Infantry crossed the Atlantic on the SS Sea Owl. The 385th reached Southampton on 4 December 1944 The 417th Infantry sailed on the SS Marine Raven. The 417th docked at Plymouth 4 December 1944. The remainder of the division sailed from Boston on 10 December 1944 aboard the Coast Guard operated transport SS Richardson. The SS Richardson docked at the Clyde River near Grenoch, Scotland on 12 December 1944. The remainder of the division headquarters sailed from New York on 4 December on the Dutch liner New Amsterdam.

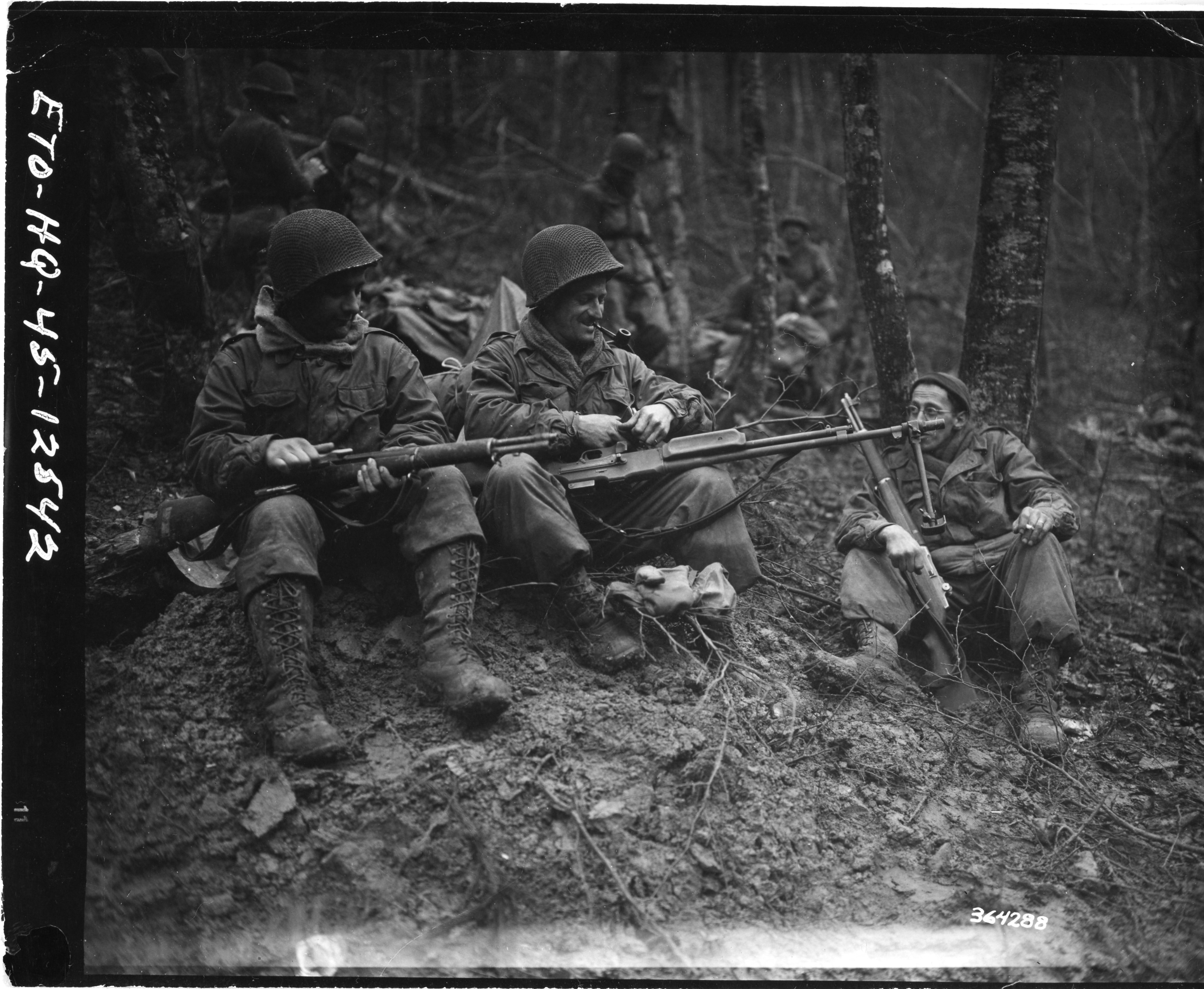
Members of 3rd Battalion, 417th Infantry Regiment, 76th Infantry Division, clean their weapons before moving up to the line near Echternach, Luxembourg. 8 February 1945.

==== Combat chronicle ====
The 76th Infantry Division arrived in England, 20 December 1944, where it received additional training. It landed at Le Havre, France, 12 January 1945, and proceeded to the Limesy concentration area. The Division moved to Beine east of Reims and then to Champlon, Belgium, 23 January, to prepare for combat. Relieving the 87th Division in defensive positions along the Sauer and Moselle Rivers in the vicinity of Echternach, Luxembourg, 25 January, the 76th sent out patrols and crossed the Sauer, 7 February, and breached the Siegfried Line in a heavy assault. The advance continued across the Prum and Nims Rivers, 25–27 February. Katzenkopf fortress and Irrel fell on 28 February and the attack pushed on toward Trier, reaching the Moselle, 3 March. Driving across the Kyll River, the division took Hosten, 3 March, Speicher on 5 March and Karl on 10 March; swung south and cleared the area north of the Moselle, crossing the river, 18 March, near Mülheim an der Mosel. Moving to the Rhine, the 76th took over defenses from Boppard to St. Goar and crossed the Rhine at Boppard, 27 March. It drove east and took Kamberg in a house-to-house struggle, 29 March. A new attack was launched 4 April and the Werra River was reached the next day. The attack continued in conjunction with the 6th Armored Division; Langensalza fell and the Gera River was crossed, 11 April. Zeitz was captured after a violent struggle, 14–15 April, and the 76th reached the Mulde River on 16 April, going into defensive positions to hold a bridgehead across the Mulde near Chemnitz until VE-day.

==== Casualties ====
- Total battle casualties: 2,395
- Killed in action: 433
- Wounded in action: 1,811
- Missing in action: 10
- Prisoner of war: 141

==== Assignments in ETO ====
- 9 January 1945: 12th Army Group
- 14 January 1945: Fifteenth Army, 12th Army Group
- 19 January 1945: VIII Corps, Third Army, 12th Army Group
- 25 January 1945: XII Corps
- 3 April 1945: XX Corps
- 8 April 1945: VIII Corps
- 22 April 1945: VIII Corps, First Army, 12th Army Group
- 11 May 1945: VIII Corps, Ninth Army, 12th Army Group

==== Individual awards ====
Medal of Honor:

- Pvt. William D. McGee (Posthumously) 304th Infantry
- Pfc. Herman C. Wallace (Posth.) 301st Engineer Combat Battalion

Distinguished Service Cross:

- Capt Robert H. Bertsch (Posth.)
- S/Sgt Fred H. Brown (Posth.)
- 1st Lt Clyde W. Ehrhardt
- Pvt Michael J. Fortuna (Posth.)
- 1st Lt Frank T. Gerard Jr. (Posth.)
- 2nd Lt Myron A. Mears
- T/5 Edgar Pelletier
- S/Sgt Jacob M. Peter (Posth.)
- Sgt Vito C. Pumilia
- Pfc Leo W. Satterfield (Posth.)
- Pfc Warren H. Shorey (Posth.)
- S/Sgt Edward M. Transue
- S/Sgt Arthur D. Webber (Posth.)

Legion of Merit:

- Col. George E. Bruner
- Col. W. A. Choquette
- Col. Meade J. Dugas
- Brig. Gen. Henry C. Evans
- Col. Chifford J. Mathews
- Col. William W. O'Connor
- Maj. Gen. William R. Schmidt
- Brig. Gen. Francis A. Woolfley
- CWO Raymond J. Dutra

=== Cold War ===
The 76th Division was reconstituted in October 1946 and reactivated in November of that year as a part of the Organized Reserve, and was headquartered in West Hartford, Connecticut. Units of the division were spread throughout the six New England states.

For the next 13 years, the division served as a traditional line Infantry division, training annually at Camp Edwards, Massachusetts and at Pine Camp (now Fort Drum), New York. In May 1959, the Division was re-designated and reorganized as the 76th Division (Training) with the mission of training initial (basic) entry soldiers of various branches and in later years the division also became able to train infantry volunteers or draftees.

In this role during 1985 and 1986, in an operation codenamed "Onaway Eagle", the division successfully defined, established and executed the first USAR (United States Army Reserve) mobilization army training center at Fort Campbell, Kentucky which became the model for utilization and employment of other reserve training divisions in the United States Army. In Operation Onaway Eagle, elements of the division successfully conducted Basic Combat Training for hundreds of new soldiers.

In 1990–1991, during Desert Shield and Desert Storm, the division validated and deployed to the Middle East over 600 of its soldiers where they served with distinction with the Third Army. As part of Operations Desert Shield and Desert Storm, the 1205th Transportation Railway Services Unit (later 1205th Transportation Railway Operating Battalion), based in Middletown, CT, was mobilized to augment civilian railway employees at Military Ocean Terminal Sunny Point, a U.S. Army munitions outport located just south of Wilmington, NC, bringing in tons of explosives by rail to the secure port for shipment to the war zone. On 1 October 1994, the division was again redesignated and on 18 April 1995 was reorganized as the 76th Division (Institutional Training). Just over two years later, the division was inactivated on 15 November 1996 at West Hartford, Connecticut. The commander at the time was BG John G Pappas, who served in this position from 1 Oct 1994 until 9 Sept 1996.

=== Recent history ===
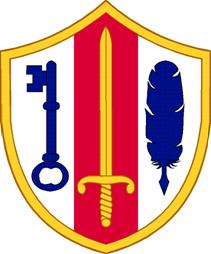
USAR Joint and Special Troops Command

In February 2013, Major General Daniel York sought a historical designation for a new command being stood up in the Army Reserve. The 76th Division was reactivated as the 76th USAR Operational Response Command (ORC) (previously the USAR Joint and Special Troops Command) and is headquartered in Salt Lake City, Utah. Their mission is to provide operational engagement packages and joint enabling capabilities for homeland response, cyber defense, legal support, information operations, and global force space enhancement requirements to combatant, unified, Joint and Department of Defense Agency Commanders.

From October 2015 to September 2017, Major General Ricky L. Waddell served as commanding general of the 76th Operational Response Command.

From November 2017 to June 2018, Major General A.C. Roper served as commanding general of the 76th Operational Response Command.

From June 2018 to July 2019, Brigadier General Douglas A. Cherry served as acting commanding general of the 76th Operational Response Command.

From July 2019 to March 2020, Major General Frederick R. Maiocco served as commanding general.

From March 2020 to August 2020, Brigadier General Douglas A. Cherry served as acting commanding general.

Major General Miles Davis is the current commanding general.

The command is made up of over 6,000 soldiers with a presence in all 50 states, the District of Columbia, Puerto Rico, the US Virgin Islands, and select locations in Europe.

== Organization ==
The 76th Operational Response Command is a subordinate functional command of the United States Army Reserve Command. As of January 2026 the command consists of the following units:

- 76th Operational Response Command, at Fort Douglas (UT)
  - Consequence Management Unit, at Aberdeen Proving Ground (MD)
  - Emergency Preparedness Liaison Officer, at Fort Douglas (UT) (liaison with FEMA regions)
    - Emergency Preparedness Liaison Officer Augmentation Group Region 1, at Hanscom Air Force Base (MA)
    - Emergency Preparedness Liaison Officer Augmentation Group Region 2, at Fort Totten (NY)
    - Emergency Preparedness Liaison Officer Augmentation Group Region 3, in Philadelphia (PA)
    - Emergency Preparedness Liaison Officer Augmentation Group Region 4, in Atlanta (GA)
    - Emergency Preparedness Liaison Officer Augmentation Group Region 5, in Saint Paul (MN)
    - Emergency Preparedness Liaison Officer Augmentation Group Region 6, in Denton (TX)
    - Emergency Preparedness Liaison Officer Augmentation Group Region 7, in Kansas City (MO)
    - Emergency Preparedness Liaison Officer Augmentation Group Region 8, in Denver (CO)
    - Emergency Preparedness Liaison Officer Augmentation Group Region 9, at Camp Parks (CA)
    - Emergency Preparedness Liaison Officer Augmentation Group Region 10, in Bothell (WA)
  - US Army Space and Missile Defense Command/US Army Forces Strategic Command — Troop Program Unit, at Peterson Space Force Base and Schriever Space Force Base (CO)
    - 1st Space Brigade, at Fort Carson (CO)
      - 2nd Space Battalion, at Fort Carson (CO)
  - 415th Chemical Brigade, in Greenville (SC)
    - Headquarters and Headquarters Company, in Greenville (SC)
    - 92nd Chemical Battalion, in Decatur (GA)
    - 457th Chemical Battalion, in Greenville (SC)
    - 479th Chemical Battalion, at Fort Totten (NY)
    - 485th Chemical Battalion, in Newark (DE)
    - 490th Chemical Battalion, in Anniston (AL)
    - 401st Chemical Coordination Detachment, at Fort Gillem (GA)
    - 429th Chemical Coordination Detachment, at Fort Gillem (GA)
    - 433rd Chemical Coordination Detachment, at Fort Gillem (GA)
  - 455th Chemical Brigade, in Sloan (NV)
    - Headquarters and Headquarters Company, in Sloan (NV)
    - 450th Chemical Battalion, in Houston (TX)
    - 453rd Chemical Battalion, in Bell (CA)
    - 468th Chemical Battalion, in Little Rock (AR)
    - 472nd Chemical Battalion, in Chicago (IL)
    - 476th Chemical Battalion, at Joint Base Lewis–McChord (WA)
  - 209th Regional Support Group, in Kansas City (MO)
    - US Army Reserve Element — Office of the Joint Chiefs of Staff, in Suffolk (VA)
    - US Army Reserve Element — United States Northern Command (NORTHCOM), at Peterson Space Force Base and Schriever Space Force Base (CO)
    - US Army Reserve Element — United States Southern Command (SOUTHCOM), in Miami (FL)
    - US Army Reserve Element — United States Central Command (CENTCOM), at MacDill Air Force Base (FL)
    - US Army Reserve Element — United States European Command (EUCOM), at Fort Devens (MA)
    - US Army Reserve Element — United States Indo-Pacific Command (INDOPACOM), at Camp Parks (CA)
      - Detachment 1, USAR Element — INDOPACOM, at Naval Air Station Joint Reserve Base Fort Worth (TX)
      - Detachment 2, USAR Element — INDOPACOM, at Fort Snelling (MN)
      - Detachment 3, USAR Element — INDOPACOM, at Camp H. M. Smith (HI)
      - Detachment 4, USAR Element — INDOPACOM, in Aurora (CO)
    - US Army Reserve Element — United States Special Operations Command (SOCOM), at MacDill Air Force Base (FL)
      - US Army Special Operations Command Support Unit, at MacDill Air Force Base (FL)
    - US Army Reserve Element — United States Space Command (SPACECOM), at Peterson Space Force Base and Schriever Space Force Base (CO)
    - US Army Reserve Element — United States Transportation Command (TRANSCOM), at Scott Air Force Base (IL)
    - US Army Reserve Element — United States Strategic Command (STRATCOM), at Offutt Air Force Base (NE), and Peterson Space Force Base and Schriever Space Force Base (CO)
      - Detachment 23, US Strategic Command, at Fort Leavenworth (KS)
      - Detachment 24, US Strategic Command, at Buckley Space Force Base (CO)
      - Detachment 82, US Strategic Command, in Dahlgren (VA)
      - Detachment 84, US Strategic Command, in Colorado Springs (CO)
    - US Army Reserve Element, Defense Logistics Agency, at Fort Belvoir (VA)
      - US Army Reserve Element — Defense Logistics Agency, at Defense Supply Center, Columbus (OH)
      - US Army Reserve Element — Defense Logistics Agency, at Defense Supply Center, Richmond (VA)
      - US Army Reserve Element — Defense Logistics Agency, at Anniston Army Depot (AL)
      - US Army Reserve Element — Defense Logistics Agency, at New Cumberland Defense Depot (PA)
      - US Army Reserve Element — Defense Logistics Agency, at Naval Support Activity Philadelphia (PA)
      - US Army Reserve Element — Defense Logistics Agency, at Hill Air Force Base (UT)
      - US Army Reserve Element — Defense Logistics Agency, at MacDill Air Force Base (FL)
      - US Army Reserve Element — Defense Logistics Agency, at Joint Base San Antonio (TX)
      - US Army Reserve Element — Defense Logistics Agency, at Joint Base Lewis–McChord (WA)
      - US Army Reserve Element — Defense Logistics Agency, at Joint Base Pearl Harbor–Hickam (HI)
      - US Army Reserve Element — Defense Logistics Agency, in Kaiserslautern (Germany)

== General ==
- Nickname: Onaway Division; formerly called "Liberty Bell Division."
- Shoulder patch: An escutcheon with a red field and a blue chief, separated by an olive drab line; a three-pronged white device is superimposed on the blue chief.
- Battle Cry: "ONAWAY" – The "alert" signal of the Chippewa Indian warriors upon whose ground the 76th Division had trained.
