= Richard H. Schoeneman =

United States Air Force major general

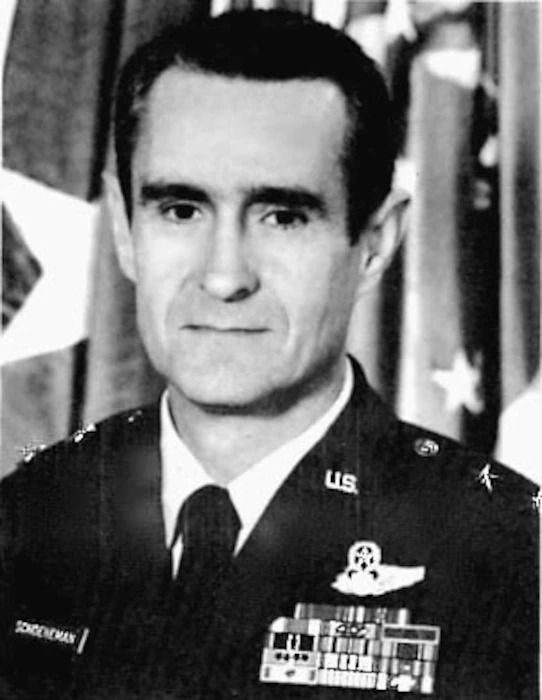
- Born: March 11, 1926; Rochester, New York
- Died: December 3, 2023 (aged 97); Niceville, Florida
- Military career
- Allegiance: United States
- Branch: United States Air Force
- Service years: 1949–1979
- Rank: Major General
- Commands: 21st NORAD Region; 12th Tactical Fighter Wing; 49th Tactical Fighter Wing; 9th Tactical Fighter Squadron
- Conflicts: Korean War; Vietnam War
- Awards: Air Force Distinguished Service Medal; Legion of Merit with oak leaf cluster Distinguished Flying Cross with oak leaf cluster Meritorious Service Medal; Air Medal with nine oak leaf clusters Air Force Commendation Medal; Air Force Outstanding Unit Award; Vietnam Civil Actions Medal First Class

Richard Howard Schoeneman (March 11, 1928 – December 3, 2023) was an American Air Force major general. As commandant of the Air War College, Maxwell-Gunter Air Force Base, Alabama, he fulfilled the responsibilities of the vice commandant of Air War College in chief in his absence. He died in December 2023 at the age of 97.

== Biography ==
Schoeneman was born in 1926, in Rochester, New York, and graduated from Edmunds High School in Burlington, Vermont, in June 1943. He attended the University of Vermont until September 1944 when he was drafted into the Army. In June 1945 he entered the U.S. Military Academy, West Point, New York, graduating in June 1949 with a Bachelor of Science degree in military engineering and commissioned a second lieutenant. He also has a Master of Science degree in public administration and international relations from The George Washington University. Military education includes attendance at the Air Command and Staff College and the National War College. After graduation from the academy, he entered flying training at Randolph Air Force Base, Texas, and Williams Air Force Base, Arizona, and was awarded his pilot wings in August 1950.

During the Korean War, Schoeneman served nine months in the 94th Fighter-Interceptor Squadron at George Air Force Base, California, and then was assigned to the 16th Fighter-Interceptor Squadron at Suwon, Korea. His combat tour of duty in Korea included 33 missions in the F-80A aircraft and 67 missions in the F-86E. He is credited with destroying two MiG-15 aircraft and one IL-10. For service in Korea, he received the Distinguished Flying Cross and the Air Medal with four oak leaf clusters.

He returned to the United States in June 1952 and was assigned to the U.S. Military Academy, where he served as aide-de-camp to the commandant of cadets. He was transferred to Nellis Air Force Base, Nevada, in August 1954, where he was an instructor, flight commander, and squadron commander at the Combat Crew Training Center. He was awarded Korean pilot wings for his participation in training the first class of Korean student pilots.

From June 1957 to September 1960, Schoeneman was assigned to the 91st Tactical Fighter Squadron at Bentwaters, England. The squadron was equipped with the F-84F and F-101A aircraft. His following assignment was Air Command and Staff College at Maxwell Air Force Base, Alabama, from which he graduated in May 1961.

Schoeneman next served as an instructor in the joint U.S. Air Force-Army Ground Operations School at Keesler Air Force Base, Missouri, and Hurlburt Field, Florida, for three years. He then attended F-105 training at Nellis Air Force Base, and in November 1964 was assigned to the 9th Tactical Fighter Squadron at Spangdahlem, Germany, as assistant operations officer and became commander in May 1965. He was the mission commander of several combined fly-bys involving aircraft from all fighter wings in the U.S. Air Forces in Europe.

In March 1967 he went through F-4 transition training at Davis-Monthan Air Force Base, Arizona, and in May 1968 graduated from the National War College, Fort McNair, Washington, D.C.

His next assignment was to the 49th Tactical Fighter Wing, Holloman Air Force Base, New Mexico, where he served as deputy commander for operations. The 49th Tactical Fighter Wing is designated a "dual-base" unit, and Schoeneman participated in two nonstop flights - nicknamed Crested Cap - to and from Germany from Holloman Air Force Base. He was the launch control officer during the redeployment of Crested Cap I, for which the 49th Wing received the Mackay Trophy.

He was transferred to Southeast Asia in February 1971 and assigned as commander of the 12th Tactical Fighter Wing at Phu Cat Air Base, Republic of Vietnam. He served in that capacity until October 1971 and flew 102 combat missions in the F-4. He next assumed command of Task Force Alpha, Pacific Air Forces, at Nakhon Phanom Royal Thai Air Force Base, Thailand, and flew 16 additional combat missions in the F-4 and 13 missions in the OV-10.

He became assistant deputy chief of staff, operations, for Pacific Air Forces, with headquarters at Hickam Air Force Base, Hawaii, in May 1972, and was appointed inspector general in June 1974. On Aug. 11, 1975, he became commander of the 21st NORAD Region, with additional duty as commander of the 21st Air Division. Schoeneman assumed his present duties Nov. 1, 1977. He retired in 1979 with the rank of major general.

== Flight Information ==
- Rating: Command pilot
- Flight hours: More than 5000
- Aircraft flown: F-80, F-84, F-86, F-100, F-101, F-105, F-4, and others

== Major awards and decorations ==
His awards include:

USAF Command pilot badge
| Air Force Distinguished Service Medal |
| Legion of Merit with one bronze oak leaf cluster |
| Distinguished Flying Cross with bronze oak leaf cluster |
| Meritorious Service Medal |
| Air Medal with four silver oak leaf clusters |
| Air Force Commendation Medal |
| Air Force Presidential Unit Citation |
| Air Force Outstanding Unit Award with valor device |
| National Defense Service Medal with service star |
| Korean Service Medal with four bronze campaign stars |
| Vietnam Service Medal with three bronze campaign stars |
| Air Force Longevity Service Award with one bronze oak leaf cluster |
| Small Arms Expert Marksmanship Ribbon |
| Vietnam Civil Actions Medal (1st Class) |
| Republic of Korea Presidential Unit Citation |
| Republic of Vietnam Gallantry Cross Unit Citation |
| United Nations Korea Medal |
| Vietnam Campaign Medal |
