= Auw =

Auw may refer to the following places:

- Auw an der Kyll, in Speicher, Bitburg-Prüm, Rhineland-Palatinate, Germany
- Auw bei Prüm, in Prüm, Bitburg-Prüm, Rhineland-Palatinate, Germany
- Auw, Switzerland, in the canton of Aargau, Switzerland

AUW, or auw, may be an abbreviation or acronym for:

- Aircraft gross weight or All-Up Weight
- Allumwandlung, a chess move
- Aloha United Way, an affiliate of United Way of America
- Asian University for Women, Chittagong, Bangladesh
- Ahfad University for Women, Omdurman, Sudan
- AUW, the IATA code for Wausau Downtown Airport, Wisconsin, USA
- auw, the ISO 639-3 code for the Awyi language spoken in the province of Papua, Indonesia
- AUW, the National Rail code for Ascott-under-Wychwood railway station, Oxfordshire, England
