= Speicher, Germany =

Speicher
- Town
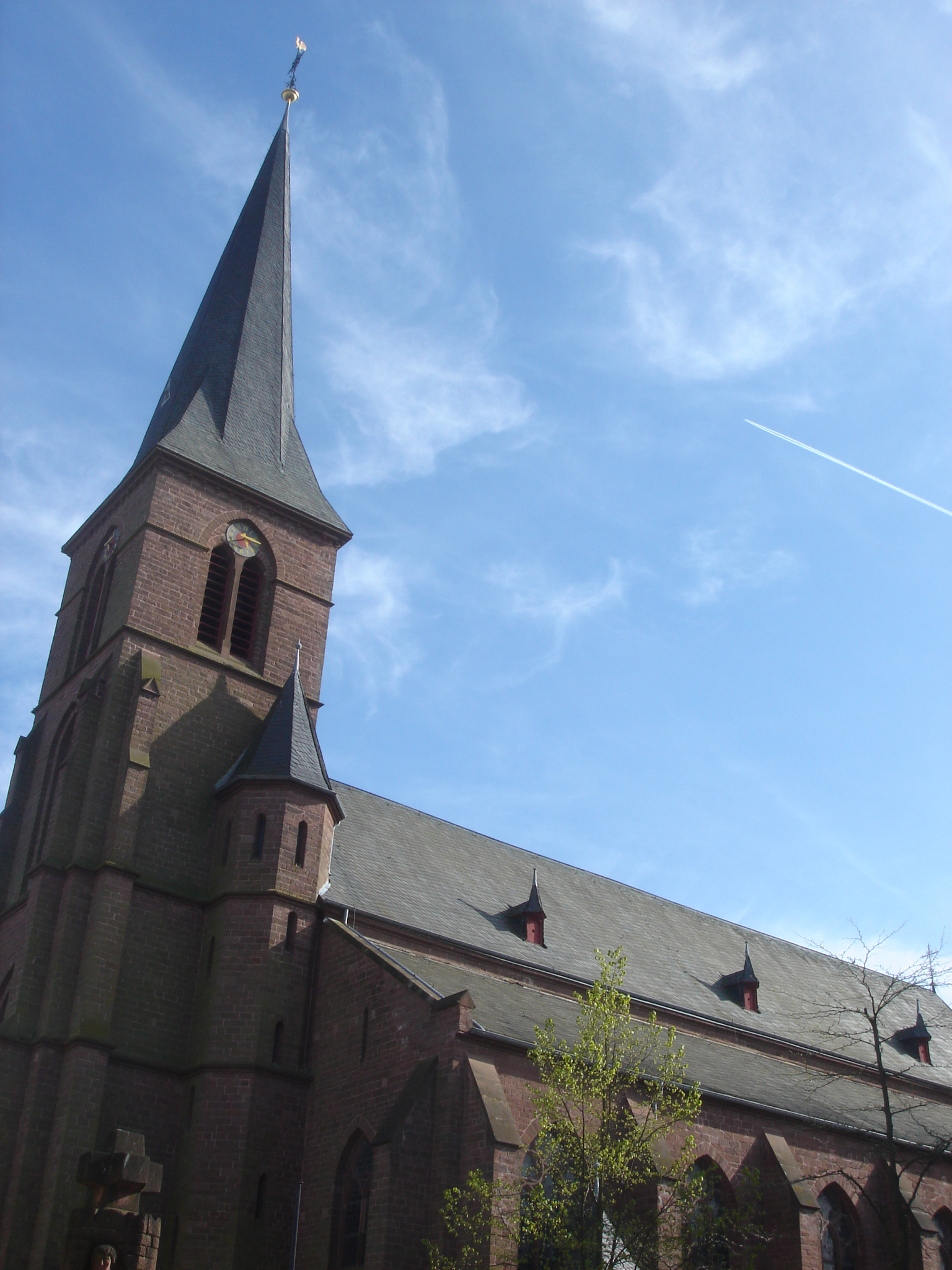
- Parish Church of St. Philippus and St. Jakobus

- Coat of arms

- Location of Speicher within Eifelkreis Bitburg-Prüm district
- Interactive map of Speicher
- Location within Germany Location within Rhineland-Palatinate
- Coordinates: 49°56′14″N 6°38′17″E
- Country: Germany
- State: Rhineland-Palatinate
- District: Eifelkreis Bitburg-Prüm
- Municipal assoc.: Speicher

Government
  - Mayor (2019–24): Erhard Hirschberg

Area
  - Total: 15.36 km^{2} (5.93 sq mi)
- Elevation: 330 m (1,080 ft)

Population (2025-12-31)
  - Total: 3,669
  - Density: 238.9/km^{2} (618.7/sq mi)
- Time zone: UTC+01:00 (CET)
  - Summer (DST): UTC+02:00 (CEST)
- Postal codes: 54662
- Dialling codes: 06562
- Vehicle registration: BIT, PRÜ
- Website: www.vg-speicher.de

Speicher (German pronunciation: [ˈʃpaɪçɐ]) is a town in the county of Bitburg-Prüm, in Rhineland-Palatinate, Germany. It is situated in the Eifel, on the river Kyll, approximately 10 km south-east of Bitburg and 29 km north of Trier. It has 3,624 inhabitants (Dec. 2020) and is next to the Spangdahlem Air Base which is home of the 52d Fighter Wing. There is a small monument to the men who died in the First and Second World Wars at the western end of the town. East of the monument is an open area for shopping and other events. Directly to the south is the parish church of St. Philip and St. James.

== Transport ==
=== Roads ===
There is a direct link from Speicher to Beilingen, Preist, Dudeldorf, Herforst, and Trier. Most of the roads in Speicher are paved.

=== Railways ===
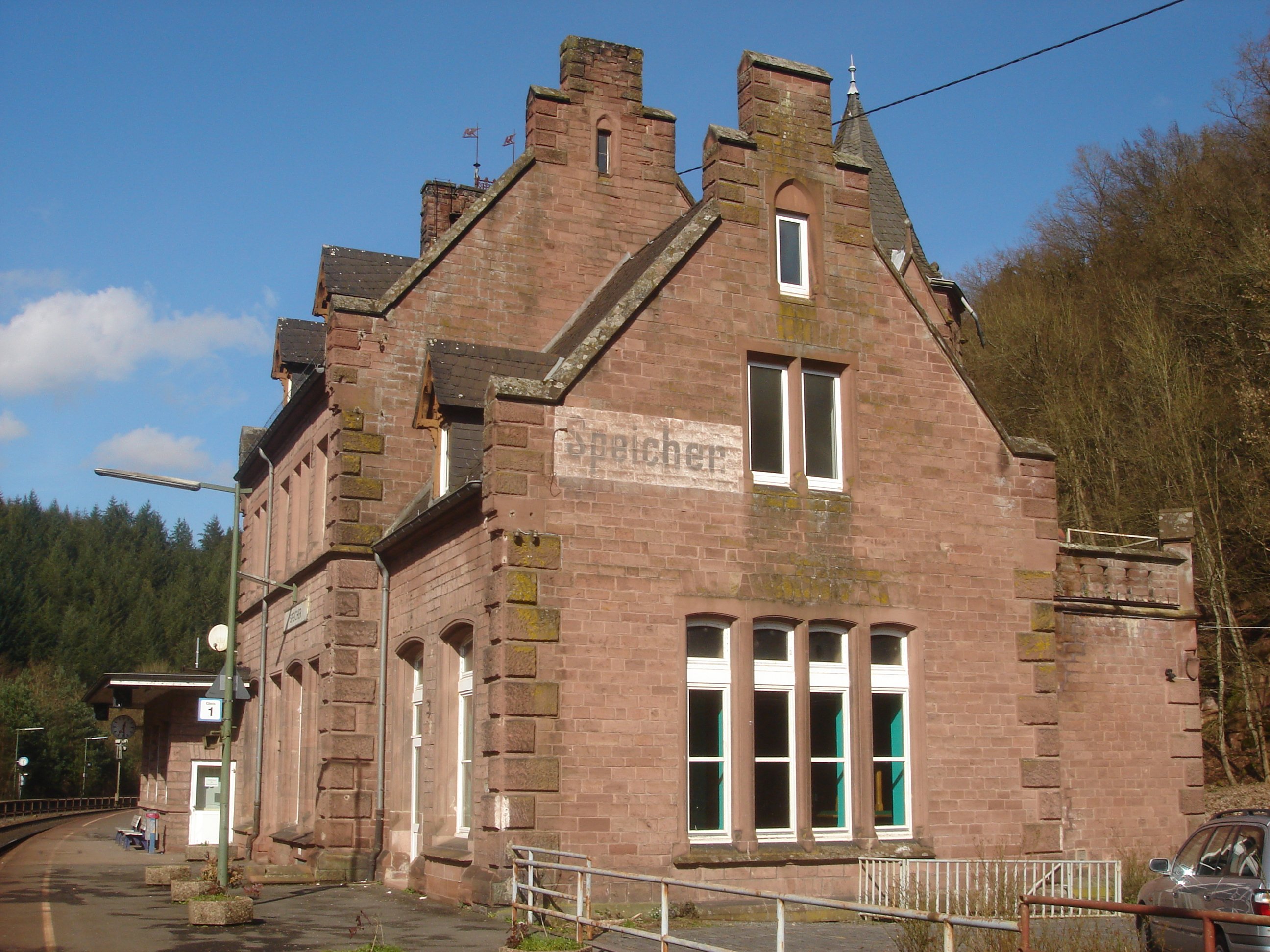
Railway station

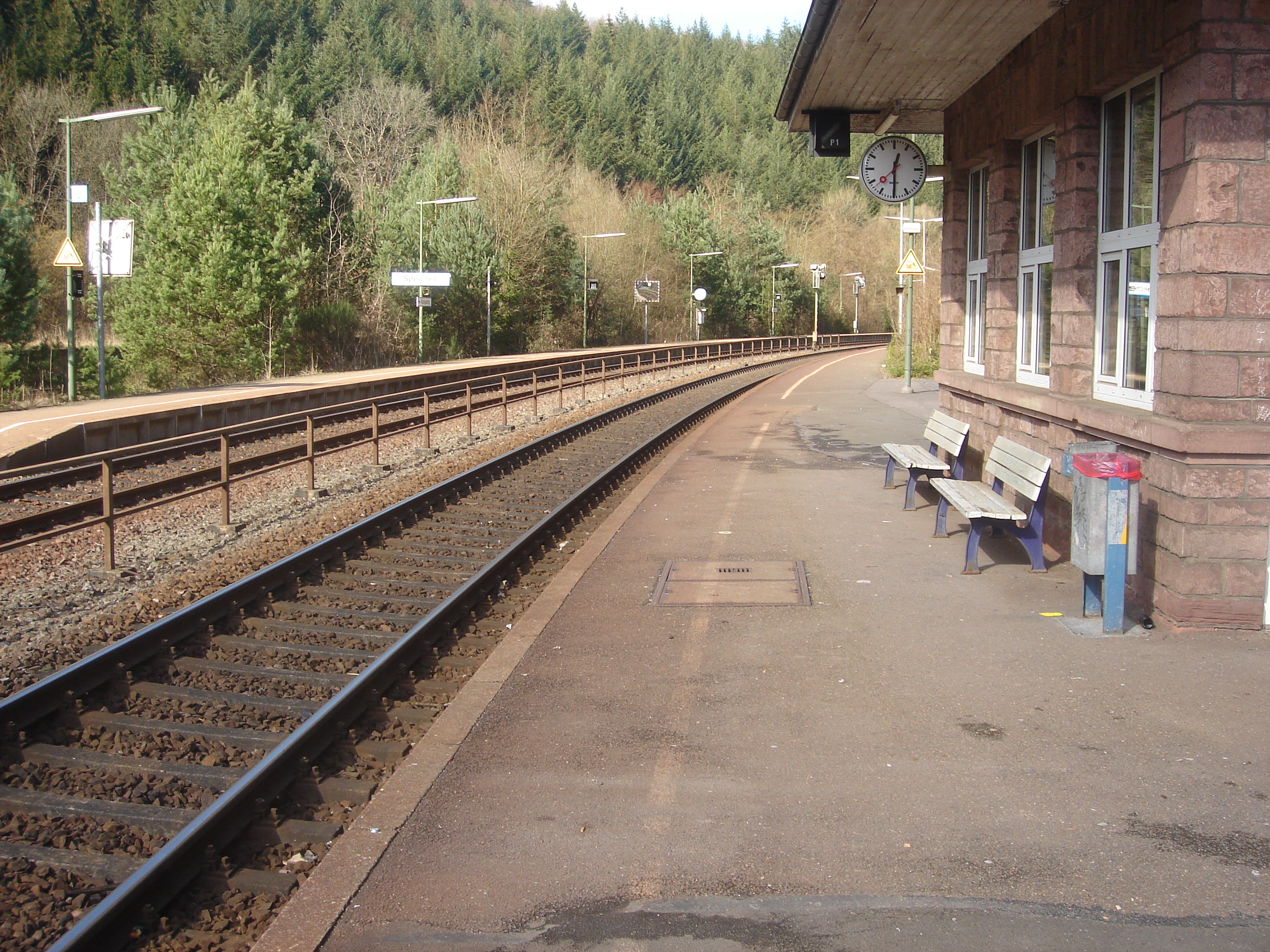
Railway station platform

Speicher station is on the Eifel Railway which runs between Trier and Cologne. The station is located between the outskirts of Speicher and Röhl.

=== Cycleways ===
There are numerous cycleways in and around Speicher. Many originated as Nordic Walking routes. There is one route that runs all the way to Trier.

== Amenities ==
There are many small businesses in Speicher, including restaurants and a pizzeria. There are supermarkets and a couple of other small grocery stores, and also a tattoo shop and a photo shop.

PLEWA is a pottery factory in the eastern area of Speicher. It specializes in gray and blue pottery that has been made in this area for nearly 2,000 years.

== Administration ==
Speicher is the seat of the Verbandsgemeinde ("collective municipality") Speicher.

== People ==
- Joscha Remus (born 1958), writer
