= Philippsheim =

- Municipality
- Coat of arms

- Location of Philippsheim within Eifelkreis Bitburg-Prüm district
- Interactive map of Philippsheim
- Location within Germany Location within Rhineland-Palatinate
- Coordinates: 49°57′19″N 6°37′38″E
- Country: Germany
- State: Rhineland-Palatinate
- District: Eifelkreis Bitburg-Prüm
- Municipal assoc.: Speicher

Government
  - Mayor (2019–24): Anja Krämer

Area
  - Total: 0.89 km^{2} (0.34 sq mi)
- Elevation: 225 m (738 ft)

Population (2025-12-31)
  - Total: 96
  - Density: 110/km^{2} (280/sq mi)
- Time zone: UTC+01:00 (CET)
  - Summer (DST): UTC+02:00 (CEST)
- Postal codes: 54662
- Dialling codes: 06565
- Vehicle registration: BIT
- Website: Philippsheim at site www.vg-speicher.de

Philippsheim is a municipality in the district of Bitburg-Prüm, in Rhineland-Palatinate, western Germany.
