= Orenhofen =

- Municipality
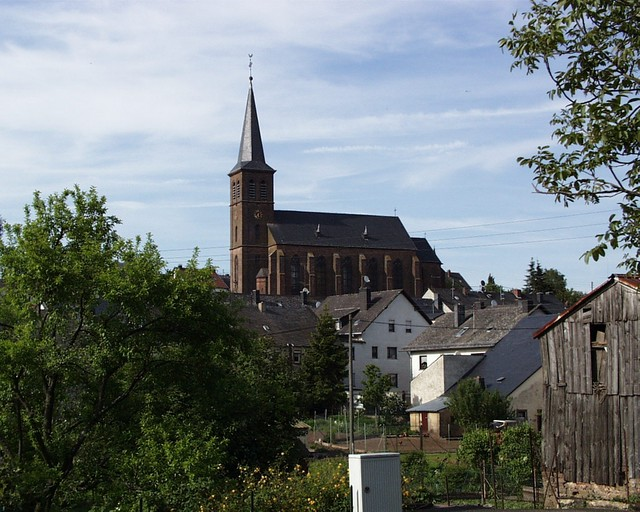
- Orenhofen with church St. Rochus

- Coat of arms

- Location of Orenhofen within Eifelkreis Bitburg-Prüm district
- Interactive map of Orenhofen
- Location within Germany Location within Rhineland-Palatinate
- Coordinates: 49°53′49.3″N 6°39′9.29″E
- Country: Germany
- State: Rhineland-Palatinate
- District: Eifelkreis Bitburg-Prüm
- Municipal assoc.: Speicher

Government
  - Mayor (2019–24): Wolfgang Horn (SPD)

Area
  - Total: 12.04 km^{2} (4.65 sq mi)
- Elevation: 355 m (1,165 ft)

Population (2025-12-31)
  - Total: 1,385
  - Density: 115.0/km^{2} (297.9/sq mi)
- Time zone: UTC+01:00 (CET)
  - Summer (DST): UTC+02:00 (CEST)
- Postal codes: 54298
- Dialling codes: 06580
- Vehicle registration: BIT
- Website: Orenhofen at site www.vg-speicher.de

Orenhofen is a municipality in the district of Bitburg-Prüm, in Rhineland-Palatinate, western Germany.
