= Joscha Remus =

German author (born 1958)

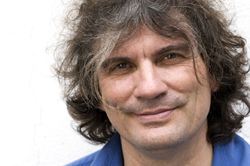
- Born: 23 August 1958 (age 66); Speicher, Germany
- Occupation: Writer, journalist, photographer
- Genre: Travel, Science

Joscha Remus is a German author. Remus comes from a bukovinish-Moselle Franconian family. He studied biology, German and philosophy in Trier and Berlin. After traveling abroad and then working on a medical journal, he trained in Berlin, Rome and London where he worked as a children's physiotherapist developing methods of "motor intelligence".

In the nineties Joscha Remus began publishing books, travel guides, and prose. It was during a training program for sound engineering at Thorolf Dormer in Berlin that he decided to create a travel audio book series. Since 2006 he has traveled extensively and written and produced several books in an Audio Travel Feature format for the Headroom publishing company in Cologne. In 2010 his series of travel audio books won the German Book Award.

In addition to his work as an author, Joscha Remus works as a science and travel journalist. In 2007 he founded the first knowledge cafe in Germany at the Stuttgart Mediothek (a part of Stuttgart City Library). Joscha Remus lives "on travel" with resting-points in Berlin and Istanbul (European summer)- and Australia and New Zealand (European winter).

== Works ==
Books

- Der Lichtertanz am Mauerpark.Lesereise Berlin (A travel to Berlin). Vienna: Picus, 2013
- Gebrauchsanweisung Neuseeland. (Manual Guide to New Zealand). Munich, Piper 2012
- Der Sternenwind am Bosporus. (Starwind on Bosporus). Vienna: Picus, 2010
- Der Kuss der langen weissen Wolke. (The kiss of the long white cloud). Vienna: Picus, 2009
- Kulturschock Rumänien. (Romania Culture Shock). Bielefeld: Travel Know-how, 2006
- Der sanfte Flug der schwarzen Damen. (The Smooth Flight of the Black Ladies). Romanian Rhapsodies. Vienna: Picus, 2008
- Infonautik – Wege durch den Wissensdschungel. (Nautical Info – Paths Through the Knowledge Jungle). Offenbach: Gabal, 2005
- Rumänien und Republik Moldau. (Romania and Republic of Moldova). Bielefeld: Reise Know-How, 2010, 3rd completely updated edition
- Lëtzebuergesch. 2005, 3rd completely updated edition
- City Trip Luxemburg. Bielefeld: Travel Know-how, 2010
- City Trip Trier. Bielefeld: Travel Know-how, 2012

Children's books

- Berlin – Guide for Children. (English Edition) Vienna: Picus, 2009

Audio Books

- Die Maori. Science Feature, Cologne: Headroom Sound Production, 2012
- Morocco. Cologne: Headroom Sound Production, 2008
- Shanghai. Cologne: Headroom Sound Production, 2008
- Ireland. Cologne: Headroom Sound Production, 2009
- San Francisco. Cologne: Headroom Sound Production, 2009
- Istanbul. Cologne: Headroom Sound Production, 2010

Short stories

- The transformation of Sap. In: Iwwer borders, over frontiers Sans Frontières. Luxemburg : Editions Guy Binsfeld, 2007

Newspaper articles

- In the Junk Shop of the Imagination. ZEIT WISSEN, Nr. 2, 2005
- Braces are also Intelligent. ZEIT WISSEN, Nr. 2, 2005
- Stanislaw Lem. Visionary without illusions. DIE ZEIT, Nr. 31 2005

== Awards ==
- 2008: Prize of the Romanian Cultural Institute, Bucharest
- 2009: German Audio Book Award (Nomination)
- 2010: German Audio Book Award

== Sources ==
The information found on this page is the English version of the original German language version found here.
