= Force protection =

Military term; preventive measures taken to mitigate hostile actions

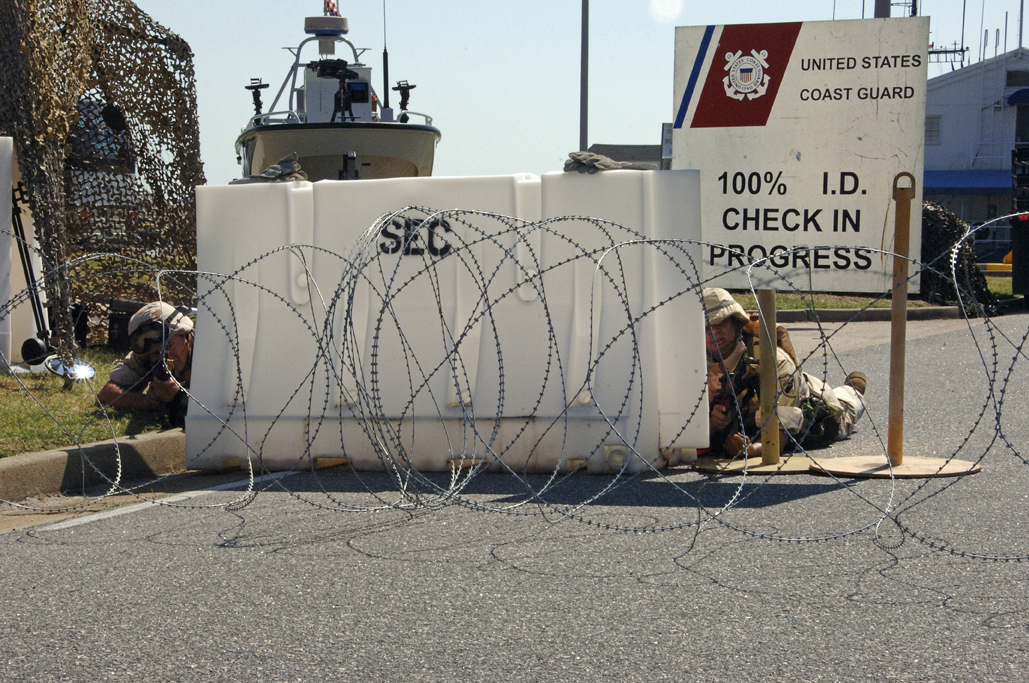
Port Security Unit 305 simulate stopping an attack on an entry control point during a demonstration.

Force protection (FP) is the concept of protecting military personnel, family members, civilians, facilities, equipment and operations from threats or hazards in order to preserve operational effectiveness and contribute to mission success. It is used as a doctrine by members of NATO.

The concept of force protection was initially created after the Beirut barrack bombings in Lebanon in 1983. With its Cold War focus toward potential adversaries employing large conventional military forces at the time (e.g., the Soviet Union, etc.), the U.S. military had become complacent and predictable with regard to asymmetric attacks by state and non-state actors employing terrorist and guerrilla methodologies. As a result, during what were ostensibly peacekeeping operations by a U.S. Marine Corps landing force ashore in Lebanon in 1983, two explosives-laden civilian trucks were able to breach the perimeter of the Marines' containment area and detonate the car bombs adjacent to the Marines' billeting areas.

Force protection was subsequently implemented throughout the Defense Department (and later adopted by the Coast Guard) to ensure that such a scenario never happened to U.S. forces again. Force protection itself is characterized by changing protective tactics to avoid becoming predictable.

== See also ==
- Pentagon Force Protection Agency
- Maritime Force Protection Unit
- United States Air Force Security Forces
- Force Protection Condition
- Base defense operations center
- Quick reaction force
- RNZAF Force Protection
- People's Liberation Army Rocket Force Special Operations Group, a missile base guard unit
- Nuclear Protection and Security Corps
