= Base defense operations center =

A base defense operations center (BDOC) is a command and control facility established by the base commander to serve as the focal point for base security and defense.

It plans, directs, integrates, coordinates, and controls all base defense efforts, and coordinates and integrates into area security operations with the rear area operations center/rear tactical operations center. A BDOC will deploy a quick reaction force to engage security events that arise.

== See also ==
- Force protection
