= Preist =

- Municipality
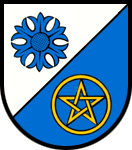
- Coat of arms

- Location of Preist within Eifelkreis Bitburg-Prüm district
- Interactive map of Preist
- Location within Germany Location within Rhineland-Palatinate
- Coordinates: 49°54′20.12″N 6°37′58.0″E
- Country: Germany
- State: Rhineland-Palatinate
- District: Eifelkreis Bitburg-Prüm
- Municipal assoc.: Speicher

Government
  - Mayor (2019–24): Edgar Haubrich

Area
  - Total: 6.42 km^{2} (2.48 sq mi)
- Elevation: 320 m (1,050 ft)

Population (2025-12-31)
  - Total: 726
  - Density: 113/km^{2} (293/sq mi)
- Time zone: UTC+01:00 (CET)
  - Summer (DST): UTC+02:00 (CEST)
- Postal codes: 54664
- Dialling codes: 06562
- Vehicle registration: BIT
- Website: Preist at site www.vg-speicher.de

Preist is a municipality in the district of Bitburg-Prüm, in Rhineland-Palatinate, western Germany.
