= No. 49 Chemical Biological Radiological Nuclear and Explosive Wing =

CBRN Wing of Sri Lanka Air Force

- Active: 2016
- Country: Sri Lanka
- Branch: Sri Lanka Air Force
- Role: CBRN defense
- Size: 6 Commissioned Officers and 50 Other Ranks
- Garrison/HQ: SLAF Katunayake
- Nickname: CBRNE

Commanders
- Current commander: Wing Commander Nilendra Perera

No. 49 Chemical Biological Radiological Nuclear and Explosive Wing (Sinhala: රසායනික ජීව විකිරණ හා න්‍යෂ්ටික පුපුරණ ද්‍රව්‍ය පක්‍ෂාංගය, romanized: rasāyanika jīva vikiraṇa hā nyaṣṭika pupuraṇa dravya pakṣāṁgaya) was established in 2016 at the SLAF Bandaranayake. The unit's first Commanding Officer was Squadron Leader (now Wing Commander) Nilendra Perera, who continues to hold this office. The wing is equipped with modern equipment required to counter chemical, biological, radiological, nuclear and high yield explosive threats.

== History ==
The unit was established in 2016 at the SLAF Bandaranayake. The No 49 Chemical Biological Radiological Nuclear and Explosive Wing came into action when a SriLankan Airlines aircraft took off from Bandaranike International Airport to repatriate Sri Lankan students from the Chinese province of Wuhan, affected by the novel coronavirus outbreak. The wing carried out decontamination operations of the aircraft fleet at the Bandaranayke International Airport during the COVID-19 pandemic.

== Training ==
Airmen are trained locally at SLAF Base Katunayake and also sent on overseas specialized training courses to countries such as Switzerland, Serbia, Norway, Bangladesh, Pakistan, the Czech Republic, South Korea, and the United States.
