= Speicher (Verbandsgemeinde) =

- Verbandsgemeinde
- Location of Speicher within Bitburg-Prüm district
- Interactive map of Speicher
- Location within Germany Location within Rhineland-Palatinate
- Coordinates: 49°56′N 6°38′E
- Country: Germany
- State: Rhineland-Palatinate
- District: Bitburg-Prüm
- Seat: Speicher
- Subdivisions: 9 municipalities

Area
  - Total: 60.07 km^{2} (23.19 sq mi)

Population (2025-12-31)
  - Total: 8,704
  - Density: 144.9/km^{2} (375.3/sq mi)
- Time zone: UTC+01:00 (CET)
  - Summer (DST): UTC+02:00 (CEST)
- Website: www.vg-speicher.de

Speicher is a Verbandsgemeinde ("collective municipality") in the district Bitburg-Prüm, in Rhineland-Palatinate, Germany. The seat of the Verbandsgemeinde is in Speicher.

The Verbandsgemeinde Speicher consists of the following Ortsgemeinden ("local municipalities"):

1. Auw an der Kyll
2. Beilingen
3. Herforst
4. Hosten
5. Orenhofen
6. Philippsheim
7. Preist
8. Spangdahlem
9. Speicher
