= Herforst =

- Municipality
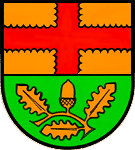
- Coat of arms

- Location of Herforst within Eifelkreis Bitburg-Prüm district
- Interactive map of Herforst
- Location within Germany Location within Rhineland-Palatinate
- Coordinates: 49°56′42″N 6°41′50″E
- Country: Germany
- State: Rhineland-Palatinate
- District: Eifelkreis Bitburg-Prüm
- Municipal assoc.: Speicher

Government
  - Mayor (2019–24): Sigrid Heinemann (SPD)

Area
  - Total: 3.75 km^{2} (1.45 sq mi)
- Elevation: 320 m (1,050 ft)

Population (2025-12-31)
  - Total: 1,222
  - Density: 326/km^{2} (844/sq mi)
- Time zone: UTC+01:00 (CET)
  - Summer (DST): UTC+02:00 (CEST)
- Postal codes: 54662
- Dialling codes: 06562
- Vehicle registration: BIT
- Website: www.herforst.de

Herforst is a municipality in the district of Bitburg-Prüm, in Rhineland-Palatinate, western Germany.
