= 415th Chemical, Biological, Radiological, and Nuclear Brigade =

415th Chemical Brigade
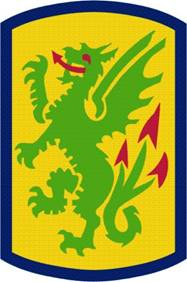
- Brigade Shoulder Sleeve Insignia
- Country: United States
- Branch: United States Army Reserve
- Role: Chemical, biological, radiological, and nuclear support
- Size: Brigade
- Part of: 76th Operational Response Command
- Garrison/HQ: Greenville, South Carolina
- Motto: CHEMISM

Insignia
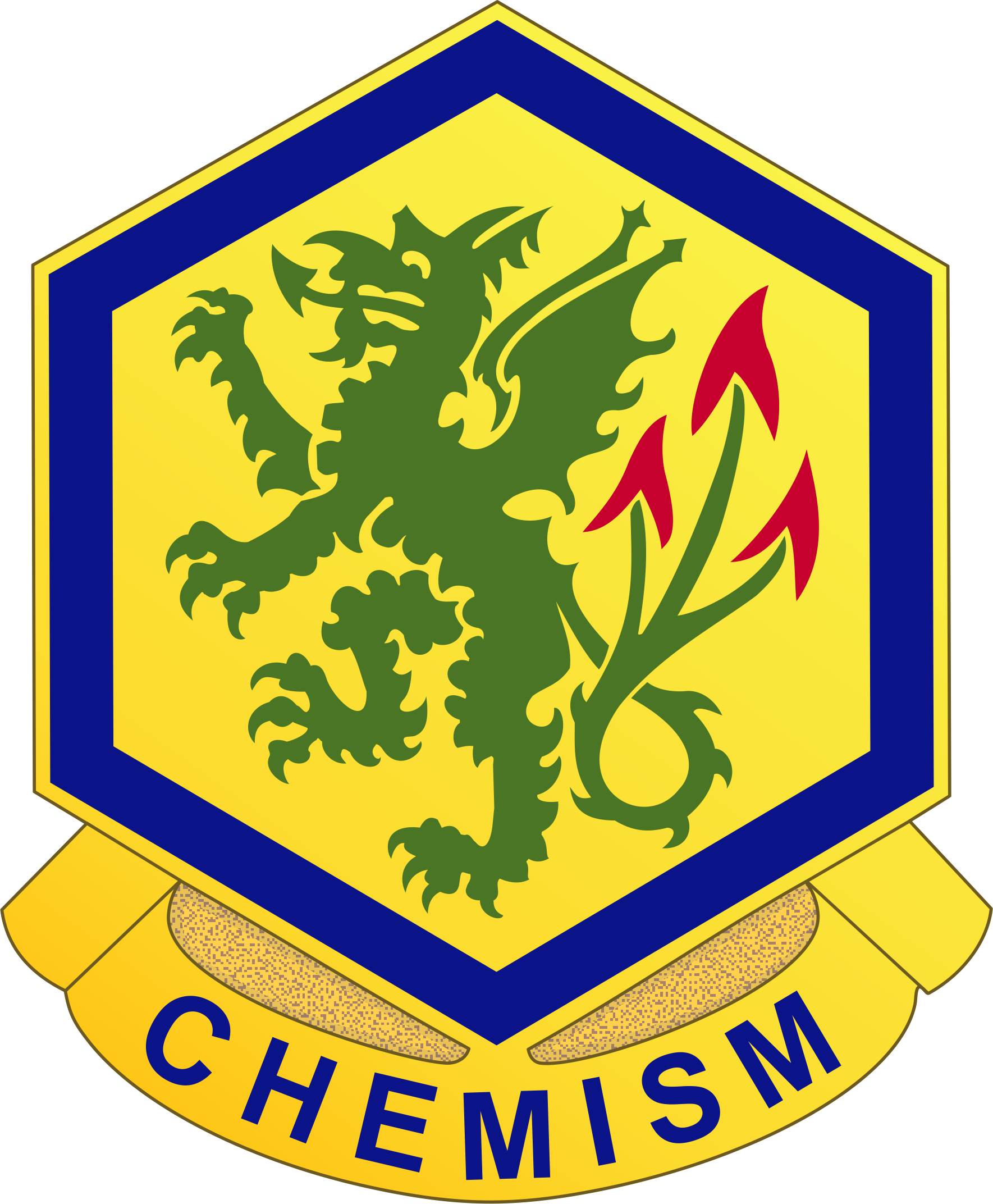
- 415TH CHEMICAL BRIGADE DUI

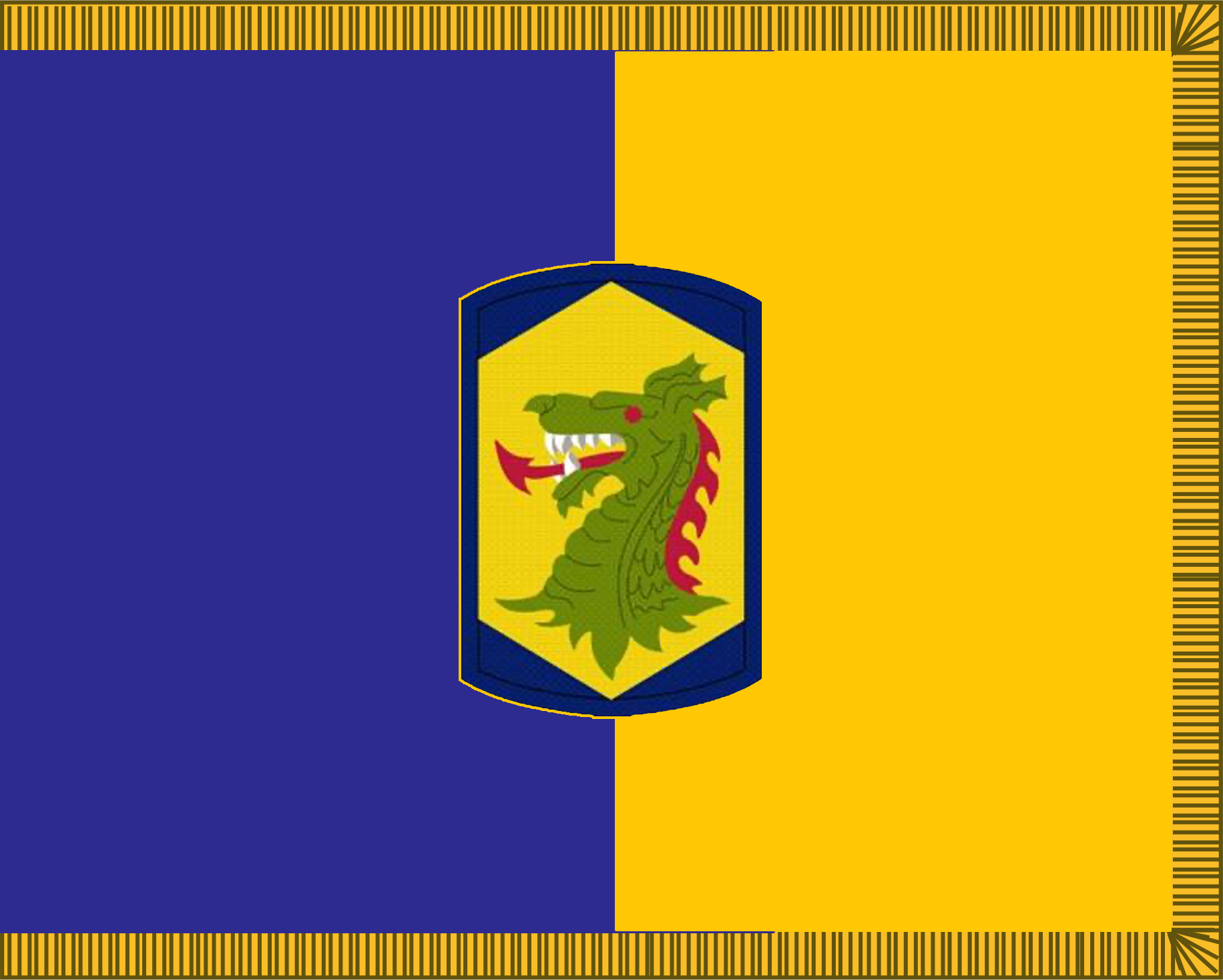
- 404th Chemical Brigade Flag

The 415th Chemical, Biological, Radiological, and Nuclear (CBRN) Brigade is a chemical unit in the United States Army Reserve, located in Greenville, South Carolina.

== Organization ==
The brigade is a subordinate unit of the 76th Operational Response Command. As of January 2026 the brigade consists of the following units:

- 415th Chemical, Biological, Radiological, and Nuclear (CBRN) Brigade, in Greenville (SC)
  - Headquarters and Headquarters Company, in Greenville (SC)
  - 401st Chemical Coordination Detachment, at Fort Gillem (GA)
  - 429th Chemical Coordination Detachment, at Fort Gillem (GA)
  - 433rd Chemical Coordination Detachment, at Fort Gillem (GA)
  - 92nd Chemical Battalion, in Decatur (GA)
    - Headquarters and Headquarters Company, in Decatur (GA)
    - 314th Chemical Company, in Decatur (GA)
    - 366th Chemical Company, in Savannah (GA)
    - 371st Chemical Company, in Greenwood (SC)
  - 457th Chemical Battalion, in Greenville (SC)
    - Headquarters and Headquarters Company, in Greenville (SC)
    - 377th Chemical Company, at Fort Pickett (VA)
    - 413th Chemical Company, in Florence (SC)
    - 414th Chemical Company, in Orangeburg (SC)
  - 479th Chemical Battalion, at Fort Totten (NY)
    - Headquarters and Headquarters Company, at Fort Totten (NY)
    - 320th Chemical Company, at Fort Totten (NY)
      - 5th Platoon, 320th Chemical Company, in Lodi (NJ)
    - 401st Chemical Company, at Fort Devens (MA)
    - 411th Chemical Company, in Edison (NJ)
      - 5th Platoon, 411th Chemical Company, in Lodi (NJ)
  - 485th Chemical Battalion, in Newark (DE)
    - Headquarters and Headquarters Company, in Newark (DE)
    - 130th Chemical Company, in Easton (PA)
      - 1st Platoon, 130th Chemical Company, in Easton (PA)
      - 2nd Platoon, 130th Chemical Company, at Aberdeen Proving Ground (MD)
      - 3rd Platoon, 130th Chemical Company, in West Hazleton (PA)
      - 4th Platoon, 130th Chemical Company, at Fort A.P. Hill (VA)
    - 300th Chemical Company, in Morgantown (WV)
    - 357th Chemical Company, in Blackwood (NJ)
      - Detachment 1, 357th Chemical Company, at Joint Base McGuire–Dix–Lakehurst (NJ)
  - 490th Chemical Battalion, in Anniston (AL)
    - Headquarters and Headquarters Company, at Fort McClellan (AL)
    - 310th Chemical Company, at Fort McClellan (AL)
    - 318th Chemical Company, in Birmingham (AL)
    - 327th Chemical Company, in Chattanooga (TN)
    - 329th Chemical Company, in Orlando (FL)

== Mission ==
To provide command and control of two to six chemical battalions and other assigned or attached separate companies at Corps level. To provide staff planning and coordination for the combat, combat support, and combat service support operations for all assigned and attached units. To allocate units and resources in support of chemical, biological, radiological, and nuclear (CBRN) reconnaissance, decontamination, biological detection, and smoke operations. And, to conduct civilian decontamination in response to a domestic accident or deliberate CBRN incident.

== Motto ==
CHEMISM is the motto of the 415th Chemical, Biological, Radiological, and Nuclear (CBRN) Brigade. This motto means chemical force or action. This dedicates the unit to the tradition of being prepared to use whatever force or action necessary for the national defense.

== External List ==
- 415th Chemical Brigade
