= Spangdahlem =

- Municipality
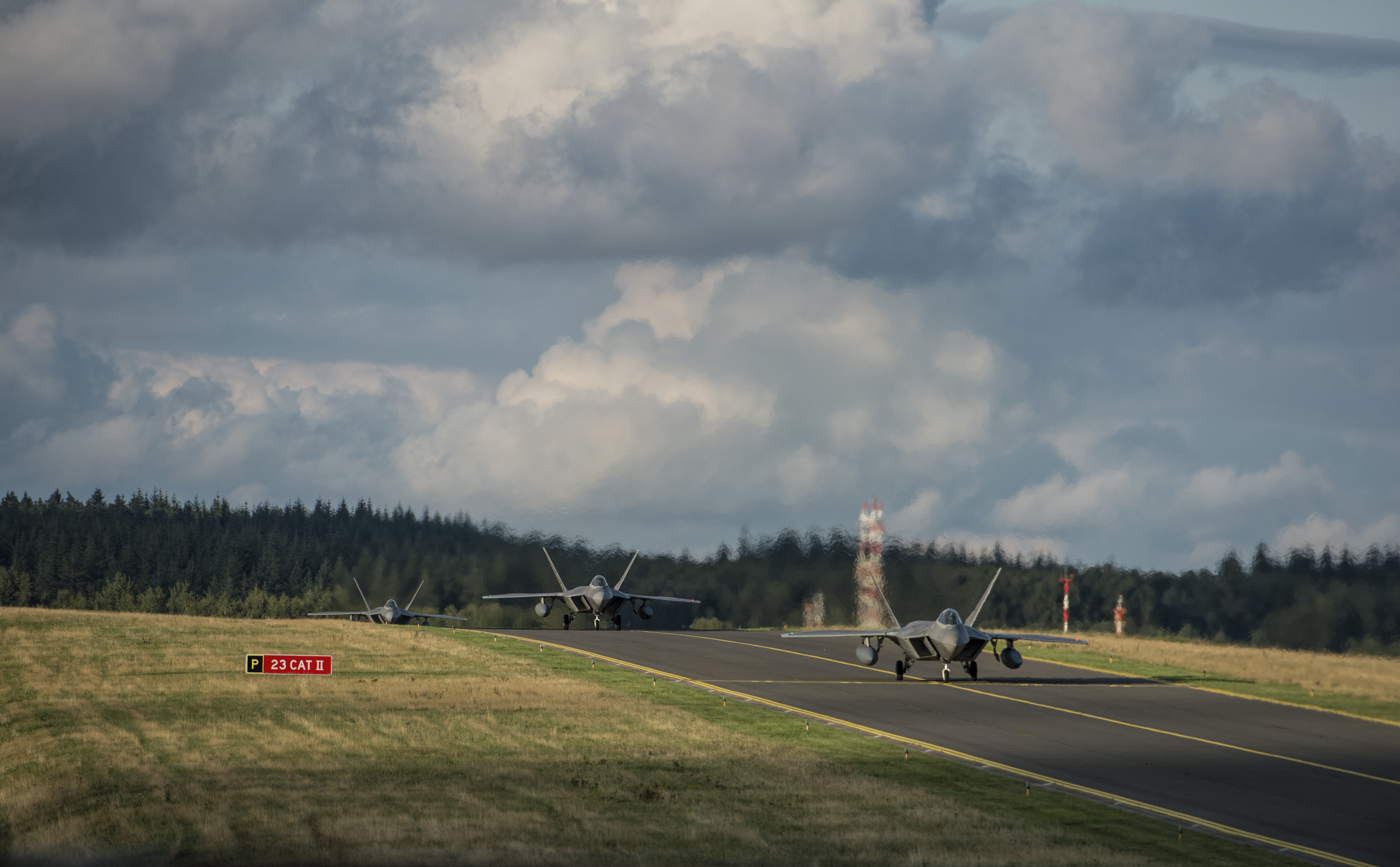
- Spangdahlem Air Base

- Coat of arms

- Location of Spangdahlem within Eifelkreis Bitburg-Prüm district
- Interactive map of Spangdahlem
- Location within Germany Location within Rhineland-Palatinate
- Coordinates: 49°59′11″N 06°40′50″E
- Country: Germany
- State: Rhineland-Palatinate
- District: Eifelkreis Bitburg-Prüm
- Municipal assoc.: Speicher

Government
  - Mayor (2019–24): Alois Gerten

Area
  - Total: 13.44 km^{2} (5.19 sq mi)
- Elevation: 305 m (1,001 ft)

Population (2025-12-31)
  - Total: 941
  - Density: 70.0/km^{2} (181/sq mi)
- Time zone: UTC+01:00 (CET)
  - Summer (DST): UTC+02:00 (CEST)
- Postal codes: 54529
- Dialling codes: 06565
- Vehicle registration: BIT
- Website: Spangdahlem at site www.vg-speicher.de

Spangdahlem is a municipality in the district of Bitburg-Prüm, in Rhineland-Palatinate, western Germany. It is part of the Verbandsgemeinde Speicher. The USAF Spangdahlem Air Base is nearby.

Spang village is on one side of the Spanger brook while Dahlem is on the other side.
