= Speicher (surname) =

Speicher is a surname. Notable people with the surname include:

- Clifton T. Speicher (1931–1952), United States Army soldier and Medal of Honor recipient
- Eugene Speicher (1883–1962), American artist
- Georges Speicher (1907–1978), French cyclist
- Scott Speicher (1957–1991), American pilot
