= Hosten =

- Municipality
- Coat of arms

- Location of Hosten within Eifelkreis Bitburg-Prüm district
- Interactive map of Hosten
- Location within Germany Location within Rhineland-Palatinate
- Coordinates: 49°53′33″N 6°37′08″E
- Country: Germany
- State: Rhineland-Palatinate
- District: Eifelkreis Bitburg-Prüm
- Municipal assoc.: Speicher

Government
  - Mayor (2019–24): Peter Reichertz

Area
  - Total: 2.88 km^{2} (1.11 sq mi)
- Elevation: 316 m (1,037 ft)

Population (2025-12-31)
  - Total: 171
  - Density: 59.4/km^{2} (154/sq mi)
- Time zone: UTC+01:00 (CET)
  - Summer (DST): UTC+02:00 (CEST)
- Postal codes: 54664
- Dialling codes: 06562
- Vehicle registration: BIT
- Website: Hosten at site www.vg-speicher.de

Hosten is a municipality in the district of Bitburg-Prüm, in Rhineland-Palatinate, western Germany.
