= Beilingen =

- Municipality
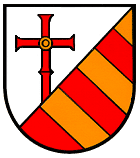
- Coat of arms

- Location of Beilingen within Eifelkreis Bitburg-Prüm district
- Interactive map of Beilingen
- Location within Germany Location within Rhineland-Palatinate
- Coordinates: 49°57′14.33″N 6°39′44.80″E
- Country: Germany
- State: Rhineland-Palatinate
- District: Eifelkreis Bitburg-Prüm
- Municipal assoc.: Speicher

Government
  - Mayor (2019–24): Norbert Schröder

Area
  - Total: 4.31 km^{2} (1.66 sq mi)
- Elevation: 320 m (1,050 ft)

Population (2025-12-31)
  - Total: 381
  - Density: 88.4/km^{2} (229/sq mi)
- Time zone: UTC+01:00 (CET)
  - Summer (DST): UTC+02:00 (CEST)
- Postal codes: 54662
- Dialling codes: 06562
- Vehicle registration: BIT
- Website: Beilingen at the website of VG Speicher

Beilingen is a municipality in the district of Bitburg-Prüm, in Rhineland-Palatinate, western Germany.
