= Nuclear Security & Protection Corps =

Nuclear facility protection unit of Iran's Islamic Revolutionary Guard Corps

Nuclear Security and Protection Corps
- سپاه حفاظت و امنیت هسته‌ای
- Seal of the Islamic Revolutionary Guard Corps
- Founded: 16 March 2022 (3 years ago)
- Country: Iran
- Role: Protect Nuclear facilities in Iran
- Part of: Islamic Revolutionary Guard Corps

Commanders
- Current commander: Ahmad Haghtalab

The Nuclear Security and Protection Corps (Persian: سپاه حفاظت و امنیت هسته‌ای) is a unit of the Islamic Revolutionary Guard Corps tasked to protect the Iranian nuclear facilities. It was announced on March 16, 2022, after several acts of sabotage against these sites.

== Background and formation ==
The creation of this corps followed a series of security breaches and sabotage incidents at Iranian nuclear sites, including the Fordow facility. These events highlighted vulnerabilities in the protection of critical infrastructure. In response, the IRGC assumed direct control over nuclear security, a role previously managed by Iran’s Ministry of Intelligence. This shift aimed to enhance secrecy and operational efficiency within the nuclear program.

== Structure and leadership ==
The corps operates under the broader command of the IRGC and is led by Brigadier General Ahmad Haghtalab. It collaborates closely with the IRGC’s Intelligence and Counterintelligence divisions to monitor, prevent, and respond to potential threats targeting Iran's nuclear assets.

== Budget ==
Analysis of Iran's 2025 budget (1404) highlights a substantial allocation of resources toward nuclear protection, with at least 607 billion tomans (approximately $12 million) designated for this purpose. This figure is important considering Iran’s struggling economy, underscoring the priority placed on nuclear security within the country's financial constraints.

The budget also includes 50 billion tomans set for the protection of “scientific elites,” as well as 376 billion tomans for the IRGC’s Protection Corps. Additionally, 3 million euros (around 181 billion tomans), funded through crude oil revenue, are allocated for the same corps to bolster nuclear security. However, the true cost of these efforts is likely much higher, as it is believed that additional funds are routed through classified or off-budget channels, which are not reflected in official public records.

== See also ==
- PLARF Special Operations Group
- Nuclear program of Iran
- Timeline of the nuclear program of Iran
- Iran and weapons of mass destruction
