= 455th Chemical Brigade (United States) =

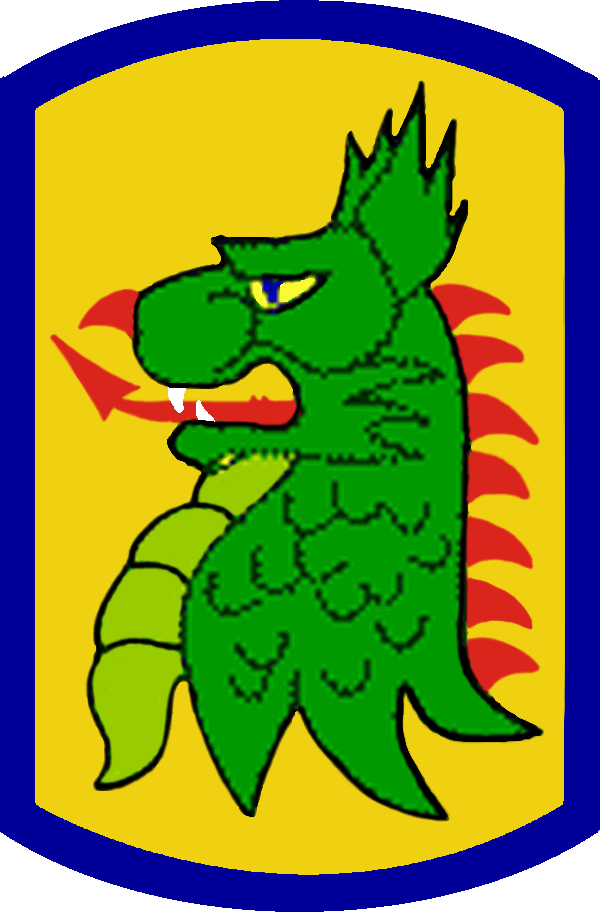
- 455th Chemical Brigade shoulder sleeve insignia
- Active: 1944–1945 (100th Chemical Battalion (Motorized), later 100th Chemical Mortar Battalion); 1948–1951 (455th Chemical Mortar Battalion); 1952–1967 (100th Chemical Group); 2000–2007; 2019-current
- Country: United States
- Branch: United States Army Reserve
- Type: NBC defense
- Part of: 76th Operational Response Command
- Garrison/HQ: George W. Dunaway Army Reserve Center, Sloan NV
- Motto: Protecting the Force
- Engagements: World War II; Iraq War

Insignia
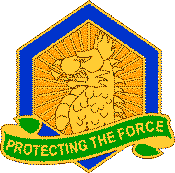
- Distinctive Unit Insignia

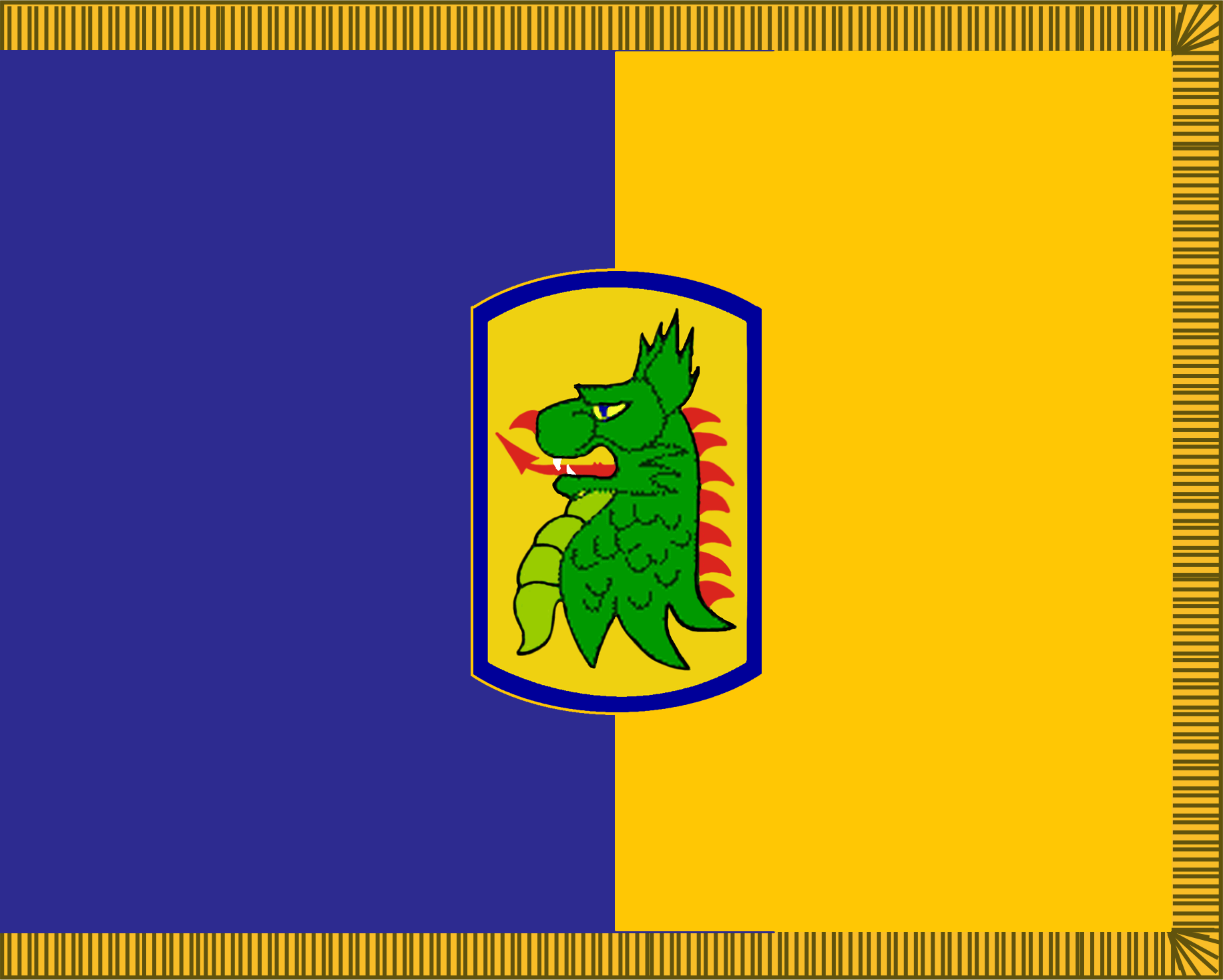
- 455th Chemical Brigade Flag

The 455th Chemical Brigade is an NBC defense formation of the United States Army Reserve, active from 2000 to 2007 at Fort Dix. The brigade headquarters deployed to Iraq with the CFLCC and Iraq Survey Group from February 2003 to April 2004. The brigade was reactivated on November 16, 2019.

The brigade perpetuated the lineage of the 100th Chemical Mortar Battalion, a unit that fought in the Italian Campaign of World War II, which was inactivated in late 1945 following the end of the war. Briefly reactivated as the reserve 455th Chemical Mortar Battalion in the late 1940s and again inactivated in the early 1950s, it became the 100th Chemical Group in 1952, and was based at Fort McClellan as a training headquarters for chemical units until its 1967 inactivation.

== Origins ==
The brigade traced its lineage back to the 100th Chemical Battalion (Motorized), constituted in the Army of the United States on 7 June 1944 during World War II, and activated on 5 August of that year at La Fagianeria, Italy. Redesignated as the 100th Chemical Mortar Battalion on 15 November 1944, it fought in the Rome-Arno, Po Valley, and North Apennines Campaigns during the Italian Campaign, equipped with the M2 4.2 inch chemical mortar. During its service the battalion lost five soldiers killed in action. After returning to the United States following the end of the war, it was inactivated at Camp Myles Standish on 13 October 1945.

The battalion was allotted to the Organized Reserve Corps on 21 October 1948 and redesignated as the 455th Chemical Mortar Battalion, before activation at Boston on 10 November of that year. Its service proved brief, as it was inactivated there on 15 June 1951. On 2 July 1952 it was again redesignated as the 100th Chemical Group (Communications Zone), a Regular Army unit, and activated on 17 July of that year at Fort McClellan, Alabama, responsible for training Chemical Corps units. In July 1957, the group's 85th Chemical Battalion rotated to West Germany as part of Operation Gyroscope, and was replaced by the 1st Chemical Battalion (Service). The latter was inactivated in December 1966, though by then the group also controlled the 2nd Chemical Battalion (Smoke Generator) and the 548th Supply and Service Battalion. It was inactivated on 24 June 1967, though it continued to serve as a provisional unit until it was formally deactivated on 28 March 1969.

== Service as Chemical Brigade ==
The 455th Chemical Brigade was reactivated on 4 June 2000 at Fort Dix, under the command of Colonel Joseph Leonelli. Assigned to the 77th Regional Support Command, it included the 462nd Transportation Battalion at Trenton and the 479th Chemical Battalion at Fort Tilden. After the Collapse of the World Trade Center the 479th's 320th Chemical Company at Jamaica, Queens was alerted in case decontamination was necessary.

On 10 February 2003 the 54-man brigade headquarters and headquarters detachment, led by Colonel Robin Byrom, was mobilized for Operation Iraqi Freedom. After deploying to Iraq, it initially supported Defense Threat Reduction Agency operations to eliminate Iraqi weapons of mass destruction while subordinated to the Combined Forces Land Component Command. Subsequently, following the end of major combat operations, it was transferred to the Iraq Survey Group (ISG), which was tasked with finding the Iraqi weapons of mass destruction. During this period the unit was responsible for Camp Slayer, provided "convoy escort security and decontamination support for WMD teams in Iraq", while "manning positions in the ISG Survey Operations Center, Sector Control Point–Baghdad, and Central Media Processing Center", along with the 450th Chemical Battalion. The brigade headquarters returned to the United States on 28 April 2004 before being released from active duty on 1 July.

The 455th was inactivated on 15 September 2007 as a result of the modular reorganization of the United States Army.

The 455th was chosen by Chemical Officers, BG Jim Blankenhorn and CPT Charles Hardenstine, to be reactivated in Sloan, Nevada under the 76th Operational Response Command. The 464th Chemical Brigade and the 63rd Chemical Group were considered. Ultimately the 455th Chemical Brigade's deployment to Iraq, as the only chemical brigade to deploy into a theater of war, drove the decision. The brigade headquarters has been reactivated since September 16, 2019.

== Organization ==
The brigade is a subordinate unit of the 76th Operational Response Command. As of January 2026, the brigade consists of the following units:

- 455th Chemical Brigade, in Sloan (NV)
  - Headquarters and Headquarters Company, in Sloan (NV)
  - 450th Chemical Battalion, in Houston (TX)
    - Headquarters and Headquarters Company, in Houston (TX)
    - 340th Chemical Company, at Ellington Field Joint Reserve Base (TX)
      - 5th Platoon, 340th Chemical Company, in Bentonville (AR)
    - 369th Chemical Company, at Fort Bliss (TX)
    - 370th Chemical Company, in Fort Worth (TX)
      - 5th Platoon, 370th Chemical Company, in Norman (OK)
  - 453rd Chemical Battalion, in Bell (CA)
    - Headquarters and Headquarters Company, in Bell (CA)
    - 307th Chemical Company, in Bell (CA)
    - 308th Chemical Company, in Vallejo (CA)
    - 355th Chemical Company, in Sloan (NV)
    - 365th Chemical Company, in Salt Lake City (UT)
  - 468th Chemical Battalion, in Little Rock (AR)
    - Headquarters and Headquarters Company, in Little Rock (AR)
    - 323rd Chemical Company, in Sioux Falls (SD)
    - 354th Chemical Company, in Louisville (KY)
    - 360th Chemical Company, at Red River Army Depot (TX)
    - 375th Chemical Company, in St. Charles (MO)
      - Detachment 2, 375th Chemical Company, in Kansas City (MO)
    - 392nd Chemical Company, in Little Rock (AR)
      - Detachment 2, 392nd Chemical Company, in Jonesboro (AR)
  - 472nd Chemical Battalion, in Chicago (IL)
    - Headquarters and Headquarters Company, in Chicago (IL)
    - 342nd Chemical Company, in Urbana (IL)
    - 379th Chemical Company, in Chicago (IL)
  - 476th Chemical Battalion, at Joint Base Lewis–McChord (WA)
    - Headquarters and Headquarters Company, at Joint Base Lewis–McChord (WA)
    - 334th Chemical Company, in Marysville (WA)
    - 349th Chemical Company, at Joint Base Lewis–McChord (WA)
    - 388th Chemical Company, in Junction City (WI)
    - 704th Chemical Company, in Arden Hills (MN)
