= Auw an der Kyll =

- Municipality
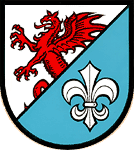
- Coat of arms

- Location of Auw an der Kyll within Eifelkreis Bitburg-Prüm district
- Interactive map of Auw an der Kyll
- Location within Germany Location within Rhineland-Palatinate
- Coordinates: 49°54′6.53″N 6°36′52.67″E
- Country: Germany
- State: Rhineland-Palatinate
- District: Eifelkreis Bitburg-Prüm
- Municipal assoc.: Speicher

Government
  - Mayor (2019–24): Günter Kirsch

Area
  - Total: 0.98 km^{2} (0.38 sq mi)
- Elevation: 166 m (545 ft)

Population (2025-12-31)
  - Total: 113
  - Density: 120/km^{2} (300/sq mi)
- Time zone: UTC+01:00 (CET)
  - Summer (DST): UTC+02:00 (CEST)
- Postal codes: 54664
- Dialling codes: 06562
- Vehicle registration: BIT
- Website: www.auw-an-der-kyll.de

Auw an der Kyll is a municipality in the district of Bitburg-Prüm, in Rhineland-Palatinate, western Germany.
