= United States Army CBRN School =

United States Army Chemical Biological Radiological and Nuclear School (USACBRNS)
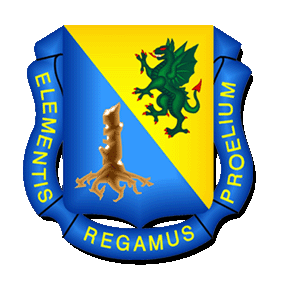
- Active: 1918 – present
- Country: United States
- Branch: United States Army
- Role: Training School
- Part of: United States Army Combined Arms Command
- Garrison/HQ: Fort Leonard Wood
- Motto: Elementis regamus proelium (Let Us Rule the Battle by Means of the Elements or We rule the battle through the elements)
- Colors: Cobalt Blue and Gold
- Mascot: Dragon

Commanders
- 34th Chief of Chemical/ Commandant: Colonel Fredrick (Fred) Bernard Parker
- Regimental Chief Warrant Officer: Chief Warrant Officer 4 Matthew D. Chrisman
- Regimental Command Sergeant Major: Command Sergeant Major David C. Henderson
- Notable commanders: LTG Thomas W. Spoehr, LTG Leslie Smith, MG Peggy Combs, LTG Maria Gervais, MG James Bonner, MG Daryl O. Hood, BG Sean Crockett

Insignia
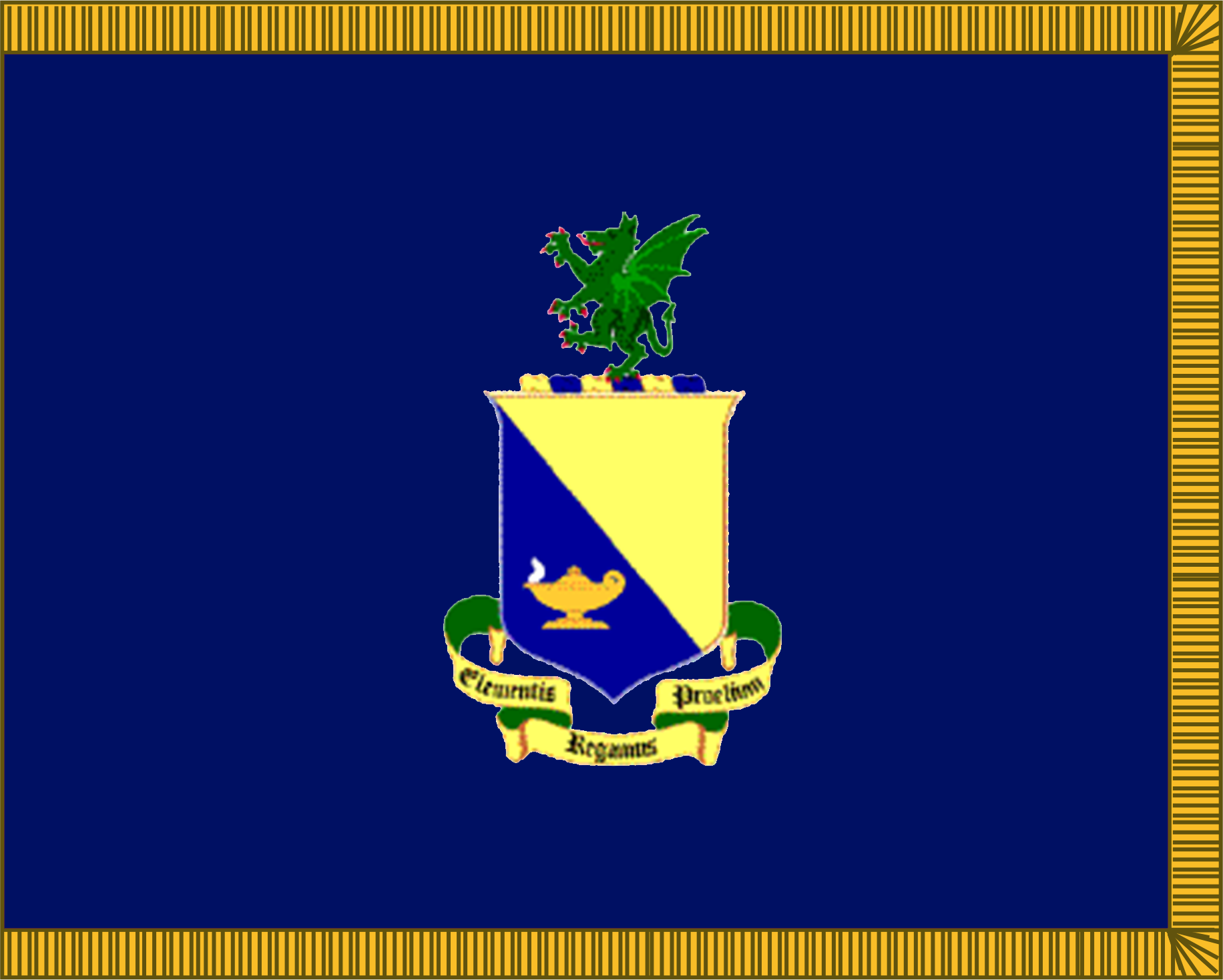
- US Army CBRN School Flag

The United States Army CBRN School (USACBRNS), located at Fort Leonard Wood, Missouri, is a primary American training school specializing in military Chemical, Biological, Radiological, and Nuclear (CBRN) defense. Until 2008, it was known as the United States Army Chemical School.

== Training Facilities ==
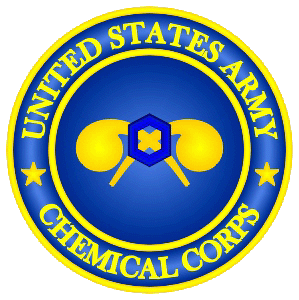
Seal of the U.S. Army Chemical Corp

In accordance with U.S. federal law, Fort Leonard Wood, Missouri, is designated as the central location for all of the Department of Defense's CBRN Operations Training, and is home to the U.S. Army's Chemical Corps Regiment. It was moved from Fort McClellan Alabama after the base was closed by the Defense Base Closure and Realignment Commission (BRAC) back in 1999.

The Army CBRN School provides numerous courses for Commissioned Officers, Non-Commissioned Officers and Initial Entry Soldiers. Numerous international organisations also send students to train at the CBRN School. Additionally, the US Air Force, US Navy, US Coast Guard and US Marine Corps also maintain training elements at Fort Leonard Wood, in partnership with the Army, to train their personnel in CBRN operations.

Fort Leonard Wood and the United States Army CBRN School have facilities, in which to conduct training, such as Chemical Defense Training Facility (or CDTF) where military students from across the globe train and become familiar with nerve agents in realistic scenarios, and conduct training with radiological isotopes and inert biological agents. The Edwin R. Bradley Radiological Teaching Laboratories is one of the few radiological teaching laboratories licensed by the NRC in the Department of Defense. It provides a variety of training in radiological and nuclear defense under the supervision of credentialed scientists.

The newest facility at the CBRN School is the Lieutenant Joseph Terry CBRN Training Facility. Opened in November 2007, the 1LT Joseph Terry Chemical, Biological, Radiological, Nuclear (CBRN) Responder Training Facility occupies approximately 22.5 acres (91,000 m^{2}) and provides a CBRN Responder Training Campus for Inter-Service and other Agencies as requested. The US Army CBRN School is the lead for all DOD CBRN Response Training. This facility provides training opportunities in the fields of CBRN Consequence Management, Hazardous Materials Incident Response, Realistic training venues and other CBRN Response arenas as required. The CBRN School also provides training in Sensitive Site Assessment and Exploitation.

In addition to training, the CBRN School also develops doctrine for Operations, researches and develops materiel requirements, and conducts joint service experimentation as the Joint Combat Developer for the Department of Defense's Chemical and Biological Defense Program.

== Official name change ==
On 11 January 2008, The U.S. Army Chemical School was renamed as The U.S. Army Chemical, Biological, Radiological and Nuclear School (USACBRNS). The name change was to encompass the wide range of training and expertise maintained by the U.S. Army Chemical Corps in the title of the school.

== Command ==
As of August 31, 2024, the commandant of the U.S. Army CBRN School is Colonel Fredrick (Fred) Bernard Parker. The Assistant Commandant is Colonel Zachary D. Brainard. The Regimental Command Sergeant Major is CSM David C. Henderson. The Regimental Chief Warrant Officer is CW4 Matthew D. Chrisman.

== Former Commandants and Chiefs of Chemical ==
		Name	Photo	Term Began	Term Ended	Y	M	D	Reason	
Director of Chemical Warfare Service
-	MG	William L. Sibert		17 May 1918	1 Mar 1920	1	9	14	Resigned	1884 (USMA)
Chief of the Chemical Warfare Service
1.	MG	Amos A. Fries		1 Jul 1920 (16 Jul 1920)	27 Mar 1929	8	8	12	Relieved	1898 (USMA)
2.	MG	Harry L. Gilchrist		28 Mar 1929	27 Mar 1933	4	-	-	Relieved	1900
3.	MG	Claude E. Brigham		9 May 1933 (24 May 1933)	23 May 1937	4	-	-	Relieved	1901 (USMA)
4.	MG	Walter C. Baker		24 May 1937	30 Apr 1941	3	11	7	Retired	1901
5.	MG	William N. Porter		31 May 1941	30 May 1945	4	-	-	Relieved	1910
*	MG	William N. Porter		31 May 1945	10 Nov 1945	-	5	11	-	-
*	BG	Alden H. Waitt		10 Nov 1945	29 Nov 1945	-	-	20	-	-
6.	MG	Alden H. Waitt		29 Nov 1945	20 Aug 1946	-	8	23	Retired	1920
Chief of the Chemical Corps
6.	MG	Alden H. Waitt		20 Aug 1946	30 Sept, 1949	3	1	11	Retired	1920
7.	MG	Anthony C. McAuliffe		1 Oct 1949	1950				Relieved	1919 (USMA)
Chief Chemical Officer
7.	MG	Anthony C. McAuliffe		1950	31 Jul 1951				Relieved	1919 (USMA)
8.	MG	Egbert F. Bullene		25 Aug 1951	31 Mar 1954	2	6	25	Retired	1917 (USNA)
9.	MG	William M. Creasy		7 May 1954	31 Aug 1958	4	3	25	Retired	1926 (USMA)
10.	MG	Marshall Stubbs		1 Sept, 1958	31 Jul 1962	3	11	-	Relieved	1929 (USMA)
10.	MG	Fred J. Delmere		Nov 1963	Jun 1964			-		
10.	MG	Llyod E. Fellenez		Jul 1964	Jul 1967					
10.	MG	John J. Hayes		Aug 1967	Aug 1972			-		
10.	MG	John G. Appel		Sep 1972	Jun 1974			-		
10.	MG	Peter G. Olenchuck		Jul 1974	Aug 1973			-		
10.	MG	John K. Stoner		Aug 1975	Jul 1980			-		
10.	MG	Alan A. Nord		Aug 1980	Jul 1985			-		
10.	MG	Gerald G. Watson		Jul 1985	Jul 1989			-	Relieved	
10.	MG	Robert D. Orton		Jul 1989	1994			-	Retired	
Chief of Chemical
24.	BG	Thomas W. Spoehr		29 Jun 2006						
25.	BG	Leslie C. Smith			10 Aug 2010					1983 (ROTC)
26.	COL	Vance P. Visser		10 Aug 2010	24 Aug 2012					1984 (ROTC)
27.	BG	Peggy C. Combs		7 Sept, 2012	5 June 2014					1985 (ROTC)
28.	BG	Maria R. Gervais		5 June 2014	26 May 2016					1987 (ROTC)
29.	BG	James E. Bonner		26 May 2016	6 July 2017					1988 (ROTC)
30.	BG	Antonio (Andy) Munera		29 June 2017	25 April 2019					1991 (ROTC)
31.	BG	Daryl O. Hood		25 April 2019	4 June 2021					1991 (ROTC)

== See also ==
- Army Gas School
- Human experimentation in the United States
