= General Sibert =

General Sibert may refer to:

- Edwin L. Sibert (1897–1977), U.S. Army major general
- Franklin C. Sibert (1891–1980), U.S. Army major general
- William L. Sibert (1860–1935), U.S. Army major general
