= United States Army Gas School =

The United States Army Gas School was established during World War I at Camp A.A. Humphreys in Virginia. The first courses began in May 1918 and the school was designed to instruct commissioned and noncommissioned officers in chemical warfare.

== History ==
In late October 1917 the War College was badly underprepared for large-scale chemical warfare in World War I. With many U.S. soldiers operating in a chemical environment with no knowledge of chemical warfare the War College requested a British gas officers and NCOs, the requests were granted. The British experts arrived and were directed and coordinated by Major S.J.M. Auld. Auld was tasked with composing a "working textbook on gas" for the U.S. Army.

Among Auld's recommendations was an idea the General Staff had already been considering, the establishment of a central Army Gas School. As a result of Auld's suggestion the Army Gas School was established at Camp A.A. Humphreys, Virginia. The school, beginning in May 1918, offered two initial courses. One course was a four-day class on general information about gas warfare and was offered to commissioned and noncommissioned officers. The second course was a 12-day affair for Chief Gas Officers which went into greater detail about chemical warfare.

Upon its establishment, Ross A. Baker was given charge of training for Chief Gas Officers at the Army Gas School. Baker was the Chief Gas Officer at Camp Pike in Arkansas and a professor of chemistry at the University of Minnesota before taking the post at Camp Humphreys. Later in the month of October 1917 the entire Army Gas School operation was transferred to Camp Kendrick.

== See also ==
- Defence CBRN Centre
- United States Army CBRN School
- United States Army Chemical Corps
- United States chemical weapons program
