= Maria Gervais =

U.S. Army general

Maria R. Gervais
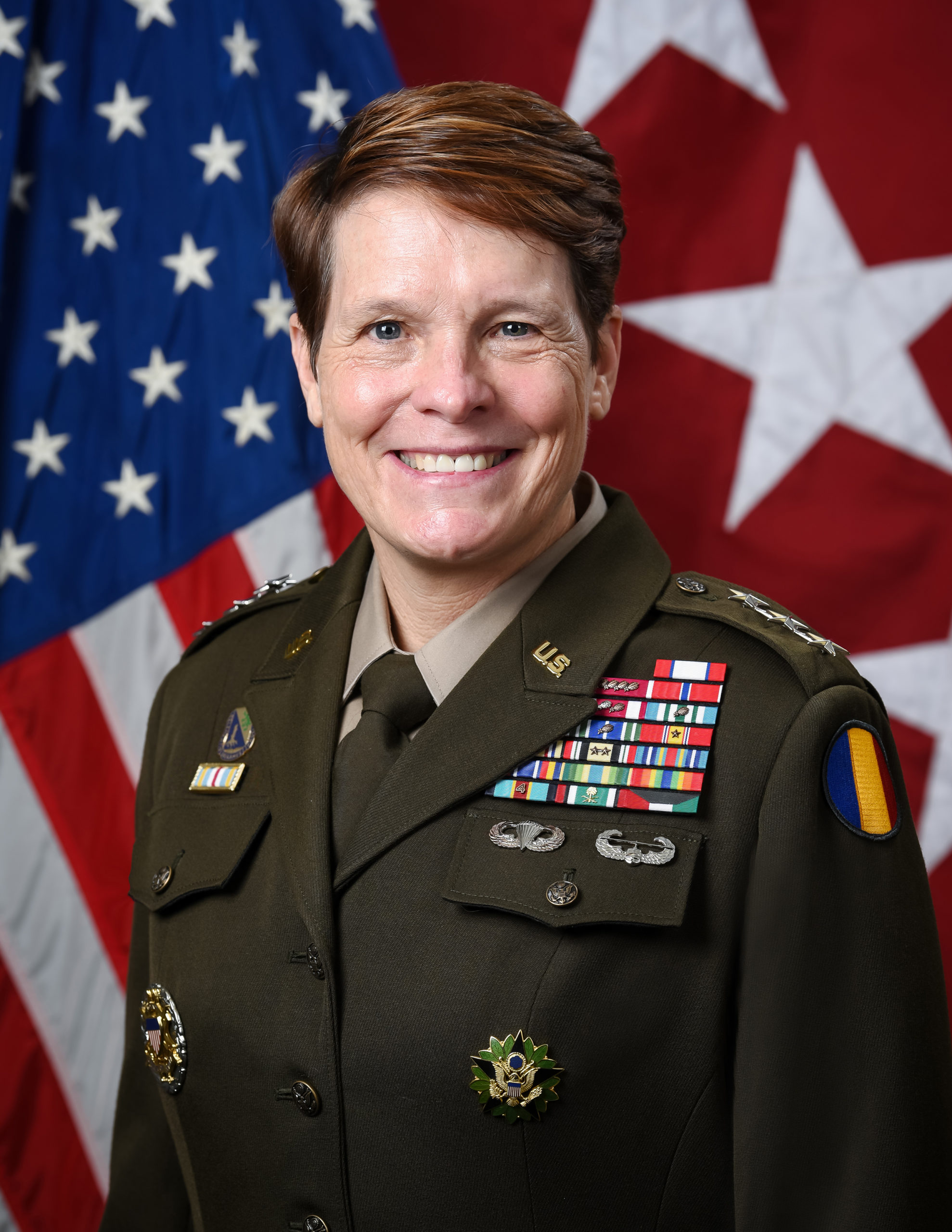
- Military career
- Allegiance: United States of America
- Branch: United States Army
- Service years: 1987–2024
- Rank: Lieutenant General
- Commands: United States Army Environmental Command; United States Army CBRN School; 82nd Chemical Battalion
- Conflicts: Gulf War; Iraq War
- Awards: Army Distinguished Service Medal; Legion of Merit (5); Bronze Star Medal

Maria R. Gervais is a retired United States Army lieutenant general who last served as the deputy commanding general and chief of staff of the United States Army Training and Doctrine Command (TRADOC). She previously served as the director of the Synthetic Training Environment Cross Functional Team, United States Army Futures Command, and the deputy commanding general of the United States Army Combined Arms Center.

Gervais assumed her last assignment with a promotion to lieutenant general on June 20, 2021, date of rank May 28, 2021. She retired on June 28, 2024.

Military offices
Preceded by Peggy C. Combs	Commandant of the United States Army CBRN School; 2014–2016	Succeeded by James E. Bonner
Preceded by ???	Deputy Commanding General of the United States Army Combined Arms Center; 2016–2017	Succeeded by Stephen L. A. Michael
New office	Director of the Synthetic Training Environment Cross Functional Team; 2017–2021	Succeeded by William R. Glaser
Preceded by Theodore D. Martin	Deputy Commanding General and Chief of Staff of the United States Army Training and Doctrine Command; 2021–2024	Succeeded by David J. Francis
