= Theodore D. Martin =

United States Army general

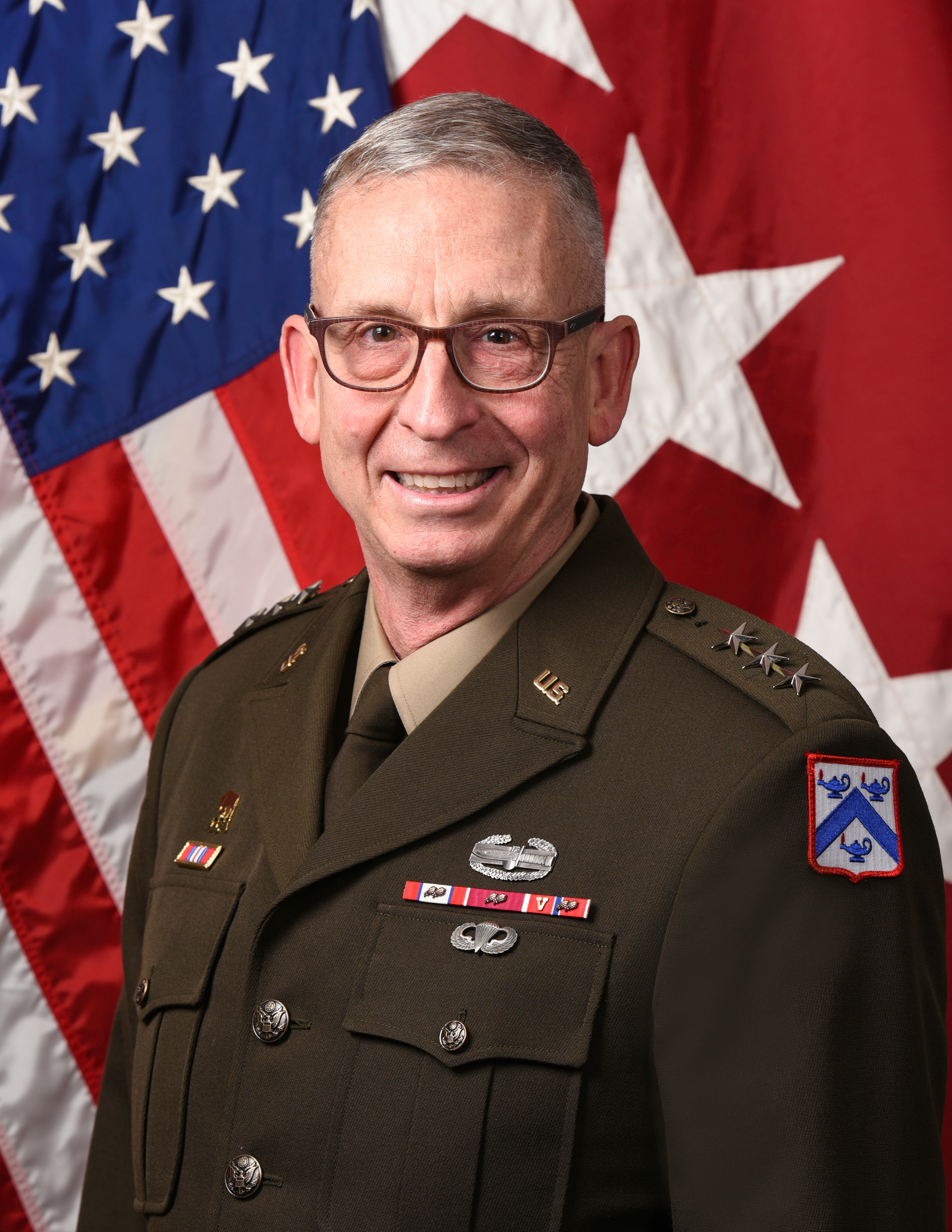
- Born: December 21, 1960 (age 65); Massachusetts, United States
- Military career
- Allegiance: United States
- Branch: United States Army
- Service years: 1983–2022
- Rank: Lieutenant General
- Nickname: Ted
- Commands: United States Army Combined Arms Center; United States Army Command and General Staff College; 2nd Infantry Division; National Training Center; United States Army Armor School; 1st Heavy Brigade Combat Team, 4th Infantry Division
- Conflicts: Iraq War
- Awards: Army Distinguished Service Medal (3); Legion of Merit (3); Bronze Star Medal (3)

Theodore David Martin (born December 21, 1960) is a retired lieutenant general in the United States Army who last served as the commanding general of the United States Army Combined Arms Center, commandant of the United States Army Command and General Staff College and commanding general of Fort Leavenworth from May 2021 to October 2022. Before that, he served as the Deputy Commanding General and Chief of Staff of United States Army Training and Doctrine Command (TRADOC). A graduate of the United States Military Academy at West Point, he previously served as its 73rd Commandant of Cadets.

== Early life and education ==
Born in Massachusetts but a native of Jacksonville Beach, Florida, Martin attended the United States Military Academy and commissioned into the Army as a Second Lieutenant in 1983. His military education includes the Armor Officer Basic Course (Cavalry Track), the Infantry Officer Advanced Course, and the Naval College of Command and Staff.

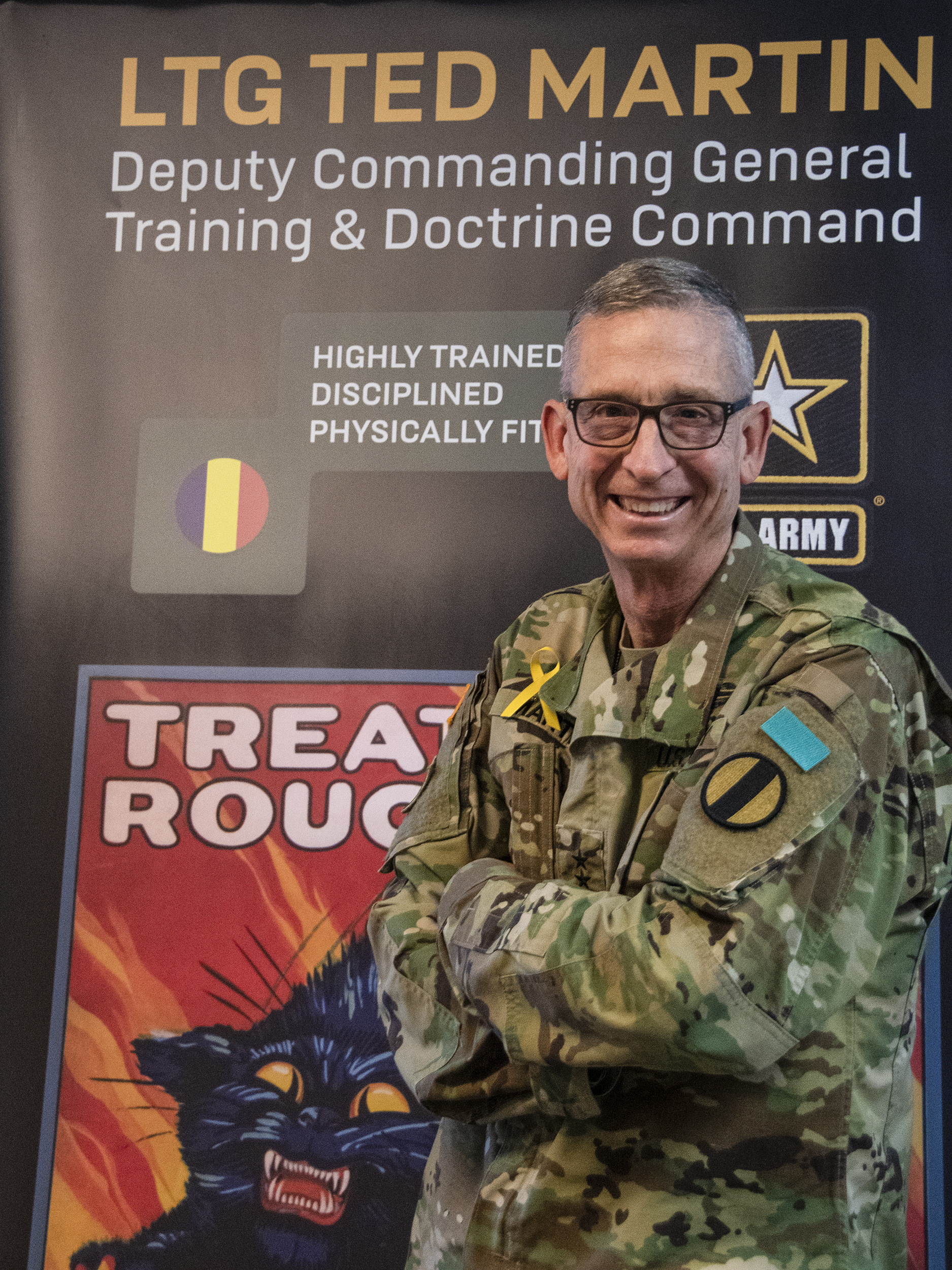
Martin speaking at an event for sexual assault and suicide awareness in the military.

He also holds master's degrees in National Security and Strategic Studies from the Naval War College, and the United States Army War College, and a master's degree in business from Webster University.

The Martin family's military heritage harkens back more than ten generations to 1776 when Private Daniel Martin enlisted in the 1st New Jersey Infantry Regiment and fought the British during the American Revolution, including service at Valley Forge.

Martin was named for his uncle who served in the Korean War alongside his father, a conflict which has not officially ended, and rests on a ceasefire maintained by a combined division of U.S. and South Korean troops which Martin would later command from 2015 to July 2017.

Martin is married and has children.

== Military career ==
Martin assumed duties as Deputy Commanding General/Chief of Staff, United States Army Training and Doctrine Command, March 5, 2018. In this role he has prioritized unit modernization for the battlefield of the future, including an emphasis on evasion of adversary electronic warfare systems, empowering units to "unplug and disappear" as a failsafe capability. He's also worked on a new leadership development program, pushing for greater trust and autonomy for lower leaders to act independently without layers of higher command approval, and emphasized a need for leaders to be well educated, ethically grounded, and of sound character. Previously he served in a variety of staff and leadership assignments including duty in:

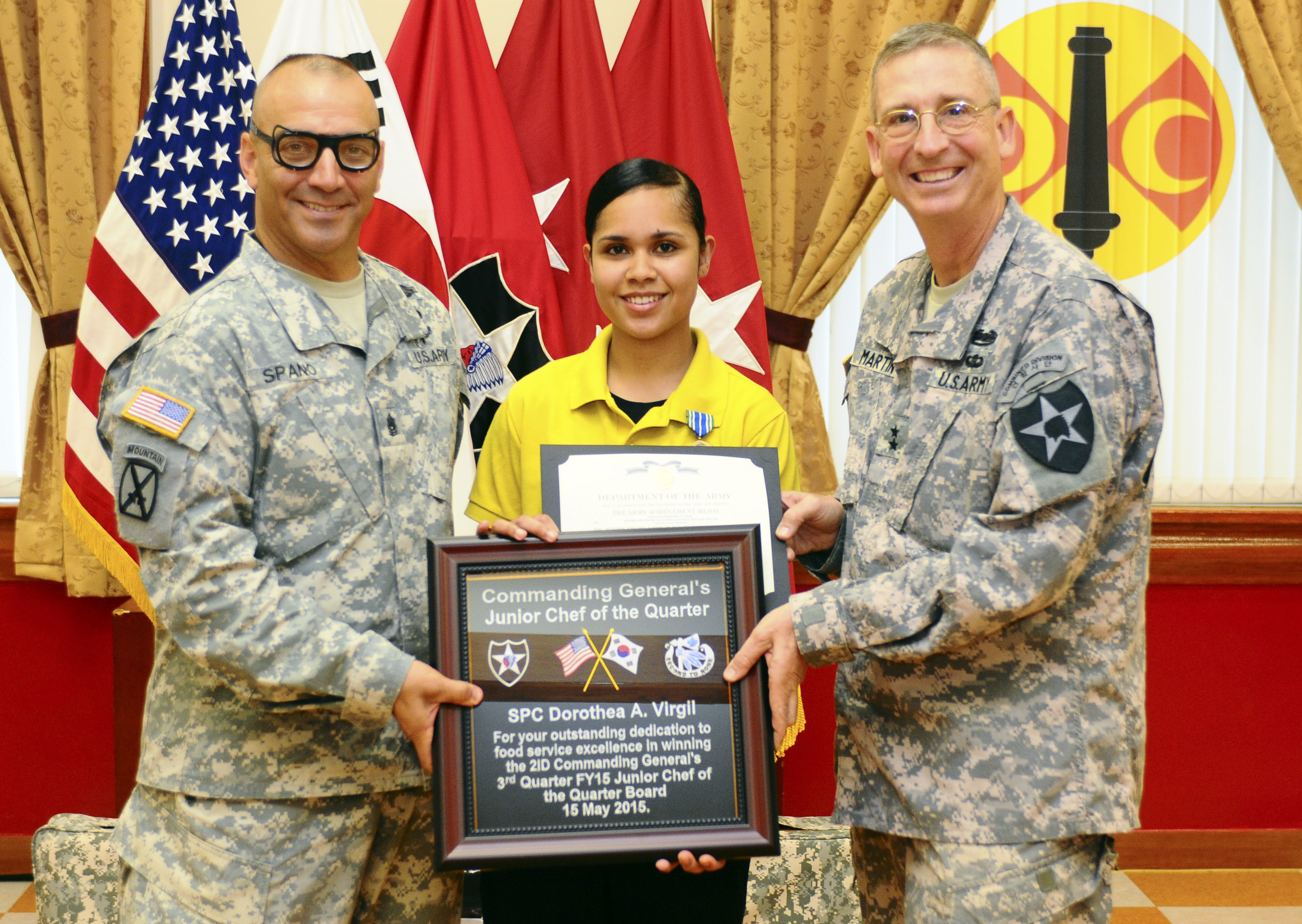
Martin while leading U.S. forces in Korea

- Commanding General, United States Army Combined Arms Center, Fort Leavenworth, Kansas.
- Deputy Commanding General/Chief of Staff, United States Army Training and Doctrine Command, Joint Base Langley–Eustis, Virginia
- Commanding General, 2nd Infantry Division (Combined), Eighth Army, Republic of Korea.
- Commanding General, Fort Irwin National Training Center and Fort Irwin
  - Director, Joint Center of Excellence
  - Deputy Director-Training, Joint Improvised Explosive Device Defeat Organization, Fort Irwin, California
- Special Assistant to the Director of the Office of Business Transformation, Office of the Under Secretary of the Army, Washington, DC
- Special Assistant to the Director of the Army Staff, Office of the Chief of Staff, United States Army, Washington, DC
- Armor Branch Chief and Chief of Combat Arms Division, Human Resources Command, Alexandria, Virginia.
- Deputy Chief of Staff (G3), 4th Infantry Division, Fort Hood, Texas and Operation Iraqi Freedom in Iraq.
- 73rd Commandant of Cadets at the United States Military Academy.
- Advisor, Imam Mohammed bin Saud Brigade, later the Prince Sa’ad bin Abdul Rahman Brigade, Kingdom of Saudi Arabia.
- Iraq Field Team Leader, Joint Improvised Explosive Device-Defeat Task Force, Baghdad.
- Martin also served as a member of the board of managers of the Army Emergency Relief fund, an independent nonprofit dedicated to addressing financial hardships among soldiers.

Martin's successor as DCG of TRADOC was announced February 25, 2021, when Major General Maria Gervais was promoted to the rank of lieutenant general and confirmed by the Senate.

Martin's successor as Commanding General of the United States Army Combined Arms Center and Fort Leavenworth was announced 26 May 2022, when Major General Milford Beagle Jr. was promoted to the rank of lieutenant general and confirmed by the Senate. The change of command occurred in October 2022.

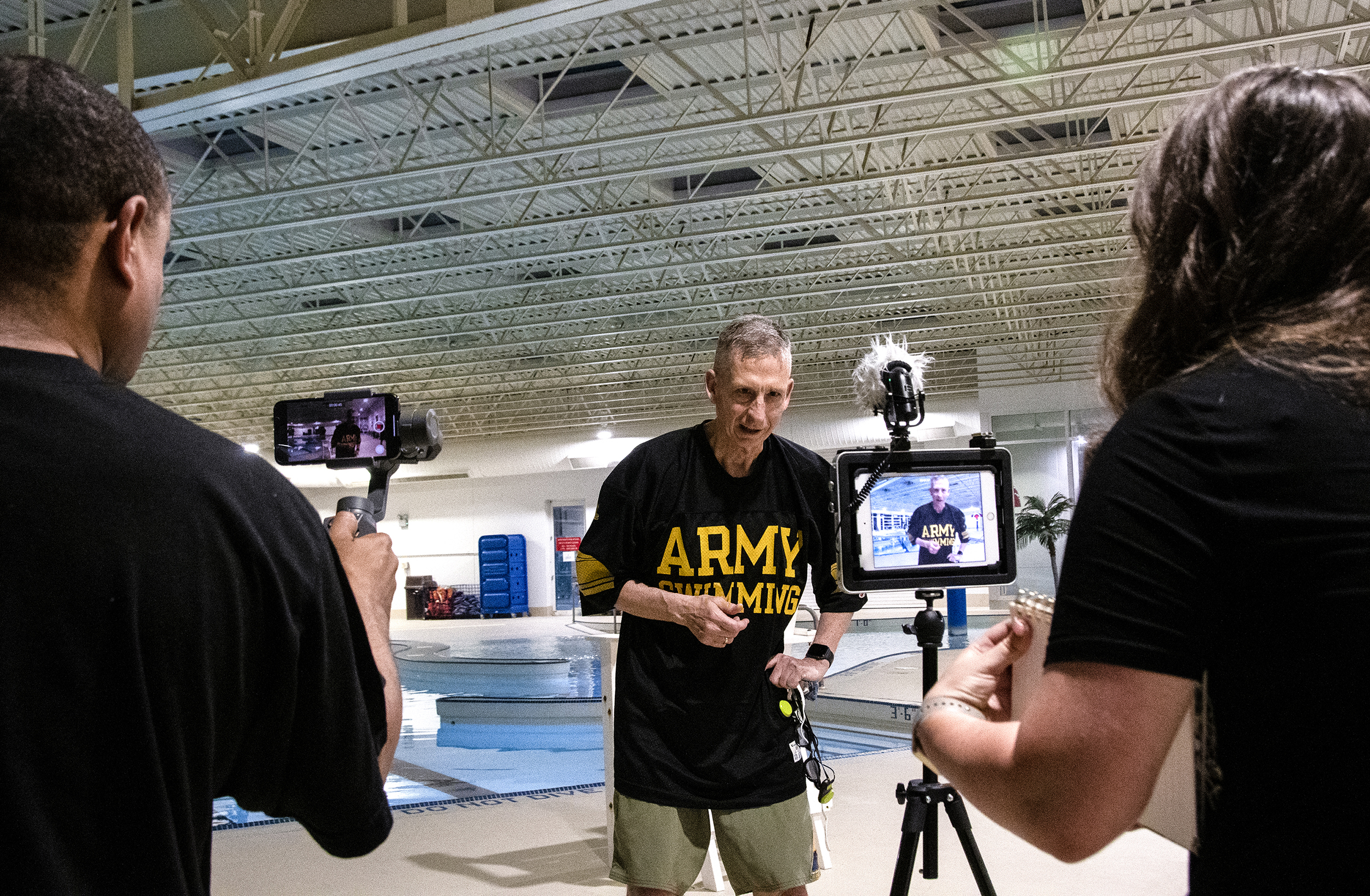
Martin producing a video for the Army's 245th birthday.

=== Social media ===
Martin is known for maintaining an active presence on the social media site Twitter, noted for his approachability despite his senior rank and the military's ingrained conservatism. He often solicits public input from his followers on issues pertaining to Army policy and concerns of servicemembers, and argued to Newsweek that his "risky" humor helps correct misperceptions and humanize the relationship and understanding between superiors and subordinate.

== Awards and decorations ==
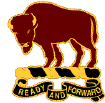
Combat Action Badge
Basic Parachutist Badge
4th Infantry Division Shoulder Sleeve Insignia
10th Cavalry Regiment Distinctive Unit Insignia
5 Overseas Service Bars

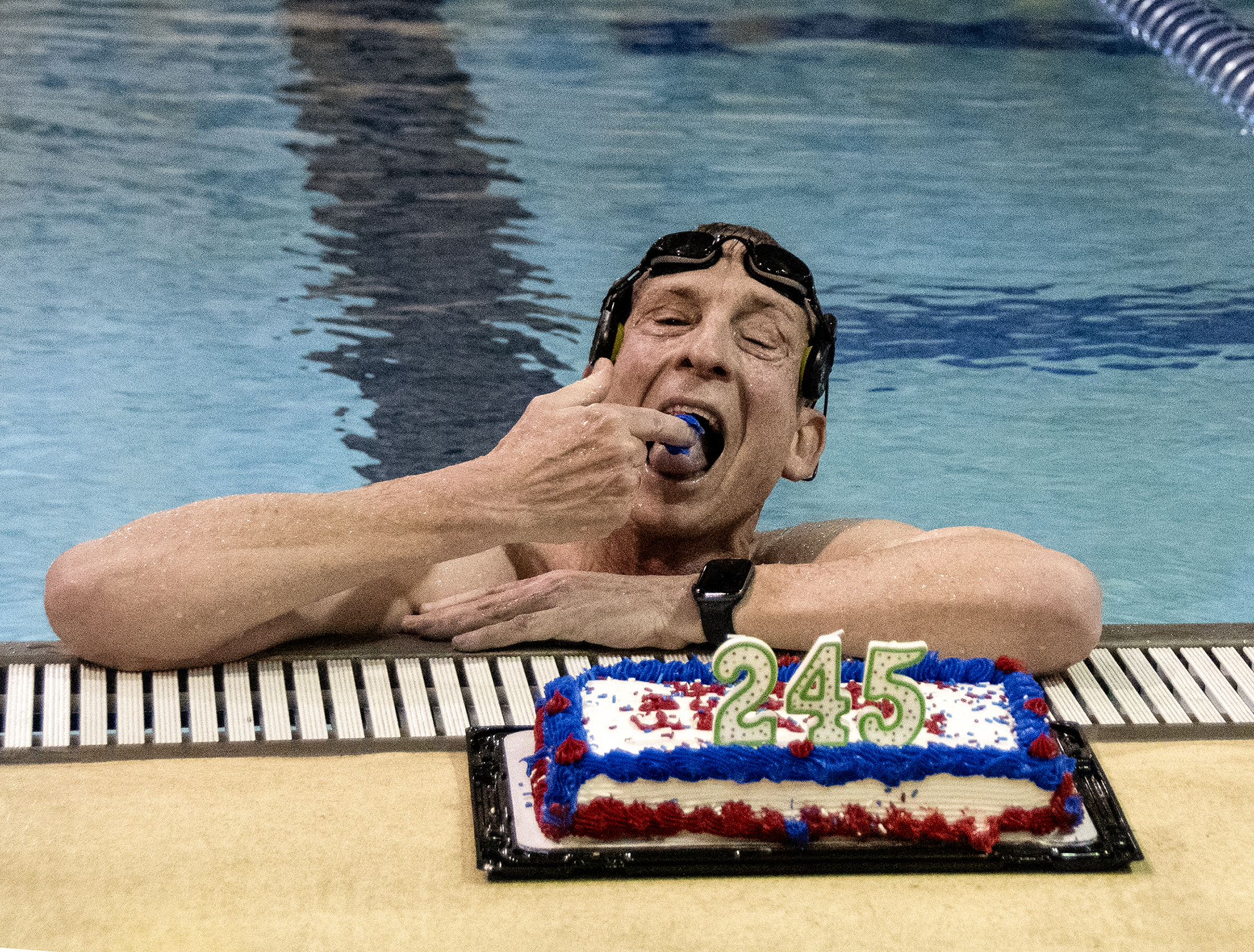
Martin celebrating the 245th birthday of the United States Army in 2020

Army Distinguished Service Medal with two bronze oak leaf clusters
Legion of Merit with two oak leaf clusters
Bronze Star Medal with "V" device and two oak leaf clusters
Meritorious Service Medal with six oak leaf clusters
Army Commendation Medal with oak leaf cluster
Army Achievement Medal with silver oak leaf cluster
Valorous Unit Award
Meritorious Unit Commendation
Superior Unit Award with oak leaf cluster
National Defense Service Medal with one bronze service star
Southwest Asia Service Medal with one service star
Iraq Campaign Medal with three service stars
Global War on Terrorism Expeditionary Medal
Global War on Terrorism Service Medal
Korea Defense Service Medal
Army Service Ribbon
Army Overseas Service Ribbon with bronze award numeral 5
Order of National Security Merit, Cheonsu Medal (Republic of Korea)

Military offices
Preceded by William E. Rapp	Commandant of Cadets of the United States Military Academy; 2011–2012	Succeeded by Richard Clarke
Preceded by Terry R. Ferrell	Commanding General of the Fort Irwin National Training Center; 2012–2015	Succeeded by Joseph M. Martin
Preceded by Thomas S. Vandal	Commanding General of the 2nd Infantry Division; 2015–2017	Succeeded by Scott McKean
Preceded by Sean MacFarland	Deputy Commanding General and Chief of Staff of the United States Army Training and Doctrine Command; 2018–2021	Succeeded by Maria R. Gervais
Preceded by James Rainey	Commanding General of the United States Army Combined Arms Center and Commandant of the United States Army Command and General Staff College; 2021–2022	Succeeded by Milford H. Beagle Jr.
