= Edwin L. Sibert =

United States Army general

Edwin Luther Sibert
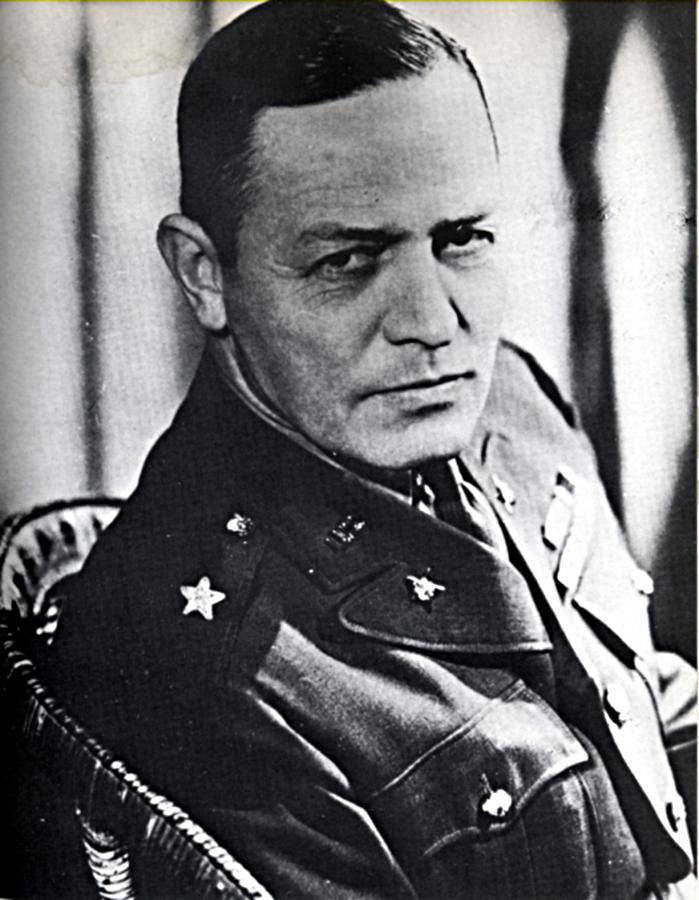
- Born: March 2, 1897; Little Rock, Arkansas, U.S.
- Died: December 16, 1977 (aged 80); McLean, Virginia, U.S.
- Burial place: Arlington National Cemetery, Arlington County, Virginia, U.S.
- Relatives: William L. Sibert (father); Franklin C. Sibert (brother); Edwin L. Sibert Jr. (son)
- Military career
- Allegiance: United States
- Branch: United States Army; Central Intelligence Agency
- Service years: 1918–1954
- Rank: Major General
- Commands: United States Army Antilles; OP4 Commander Operation PORTREX
- Awards: Distinguished Service Medal (3); Legion of Merit; Bronze Star Medal

Edwin Luther Sibert (March 2, 1897 – December 16, 1977) was a United States Army officer with the rank of major general and served as intelligence officer during World War II and post-war Europe, where he assisted in the creation of the Gehlen Organization. He would return to the United States and briefly serve in the Central Intelligence Group, the forerunner of the modern CIA. He was the son of Major General William L. Sibert and the brother of Major General Franklin C. Sibert. A graduate of the United States Military Academy in 1918, he would receive the Distinguished Service Medal three times for his service during World War II and the Cold War.

== Early life and education ==
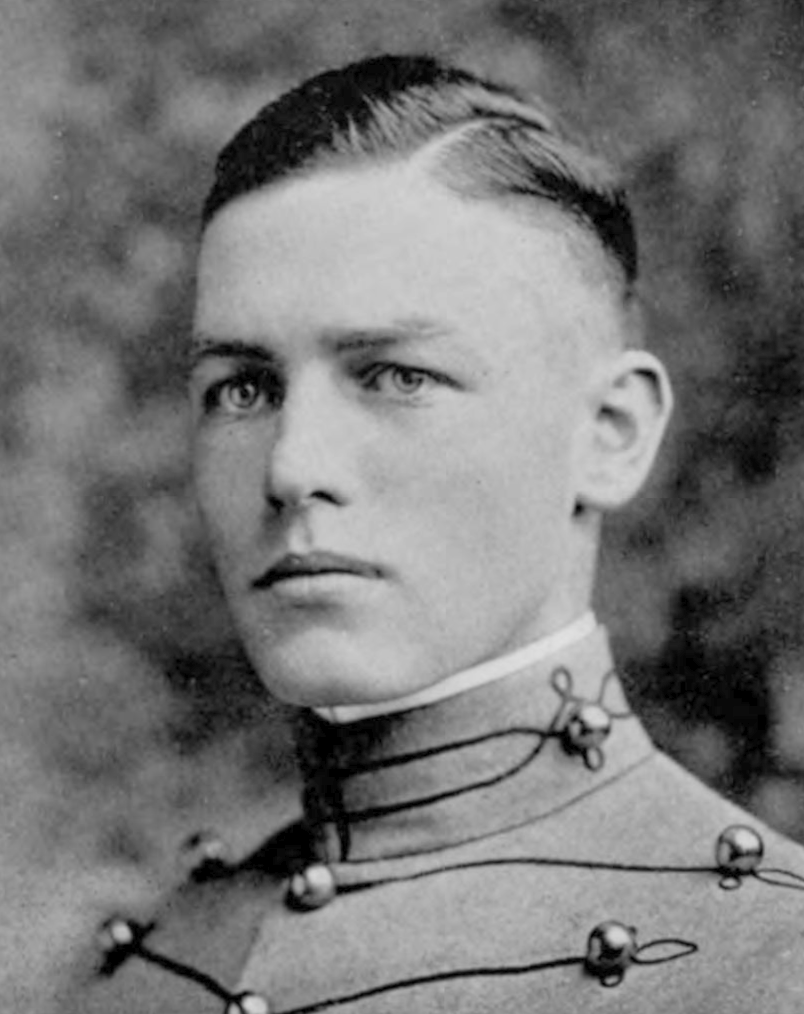
At West Point in 1918

Sibert was born on March 2, 1897, in Little Rock, Arkansas, to Major General William L. Sibert and his wife Mary Margaret Cummings Sibert. He would be raised on military tradition, his grandfather William J. Sibert and great-uncle William B. Beeson having served in the Confederate army, and his father in the United States Army. Sibert's early years would see his father assigned to Manila, Philippines (1899–1900), and the Panama Canal Zone (1907–1914).

In 1914, Sibert would receive an at-large appointment to the United States Military Academy, graduating in 1918.

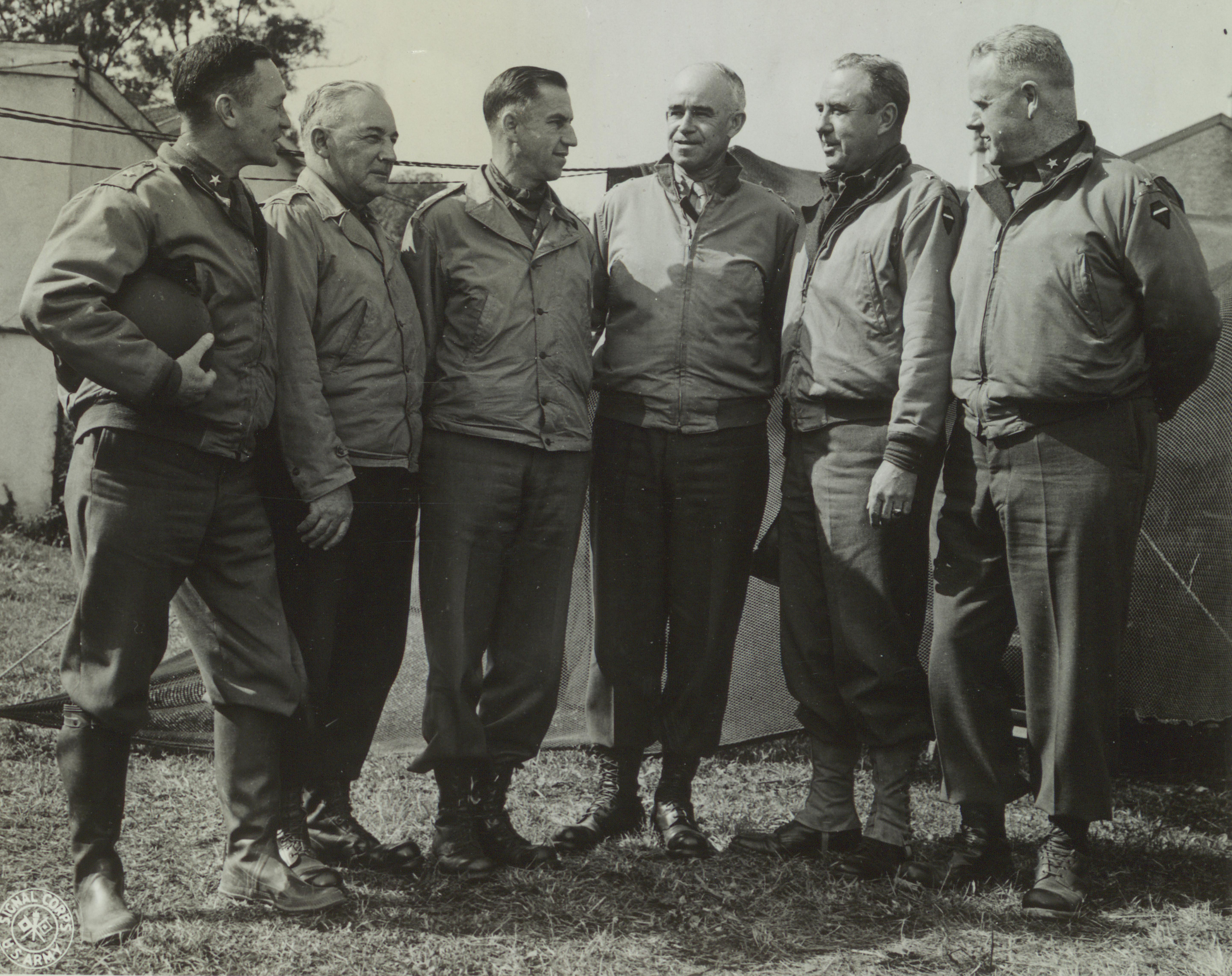
Omar Bradley and senior staff circa September 1944 - (L-to-R); Sibert, Kibler, Leven C. Allen, Bradley, Moses, O'Hare

Sibert later graduated from the Command and General Staff School at Fort Leavenworth, Kansas in June 1935. He also graduated from the Army War College in June 1939.

== Career ==
=== Dates of rank ===
Promotions
Rank	Date
Second lieutenant	12 June 1918
First lieutenant (acting)	23 October 1918
First lieutenant	16 August 1919
Captain	1 August 1933
Major	1 April 1940
Colonel (acting)	15 January 1941
Lieutenant colonel (acting)	12 June 1941
Colonel (acting)	1 February 1942
Lieutenant colonel	4 August 1942
Brigadier general (acting)	31 October 1942
Colonel	11 March 1948
Brigadier general (acting)	31 October 1942
Major general (acting)	1 August 1948
Brigadier general	21 March 1953

=== Service ===
Duty assignments
Beginning	Ending	Assignment
1936	1937	Assistant Instructor in the Department of Tactics, United States Military Academy
July 1940	December 1941	U.S. Military Attaché to Brazil
December 1941	March 1942	Assistant Secretary, Combined Chiefs of Staff
March 1942	May 1942	Attending Field Artillery School, Ft. Sill, Oklahoma
May 1942	August 1942	Chief of Staff, 7th Division
August 1942	August 1943	Commanding Officer, Artillery, 99th Division
September 1943	March 1944	Assistant Chief of Staff (G2) European Theater of Operations
March 1944	July 1945	Assistant Chief of Staff (G2), 12th Army Group
July 1945	September 1946	Assistant Chief of Staff (G2)European Theater of Operations
September 1946	12 August 1948	Assistant Director of Operations, Central Intelligence Group (CIA)
13 August 1948	23 November 1948	Commanding General, Pacific Sector, Panama Canal Zone
24 November 1948	December 7, 1950	Commanding General, U.S. Army Forces, Antilles
December 7, 1950	April 24, 1952	Staff Director, Inter-American Defense Board, Washington, D.C.
April 24, 1952		Commanding Officer, Camp Edwards, Barnstable County, Massachusetts

== Awards and decorations ==

1st Row	Army Distinguished Service Medal with two Oak Leaf Clusters			
2nd Row	Legion of Merit	Bronze Star Medal	World War I Victory Medal	American Defense Service Medal with Foreign Service Clasp
3rd Row	American Campaign Medal	European-African-Middle Eastern Campaign Medal with four service stars	World War II Victory Medal	Army of Occupation Medal
4th Row	National Defense Service Medal	Honorary Commander of the Most Excellent Order of the British Empire	Officier de la Légion d'honneur	French Croix de guerre 1939–1945 with Palm

== Later life ==
After retirement, Sibert lived on Martha's Vineyard and spent his winters in Charleston, South Carolina. He moved to McLean, Virginia in 1972 and died there from a ruptured aneurysm in 1977. Sibert is buried at Arlington National Cemetery along with his father MG William Luther Sibert.
