= William N. Porter =

United States Army general

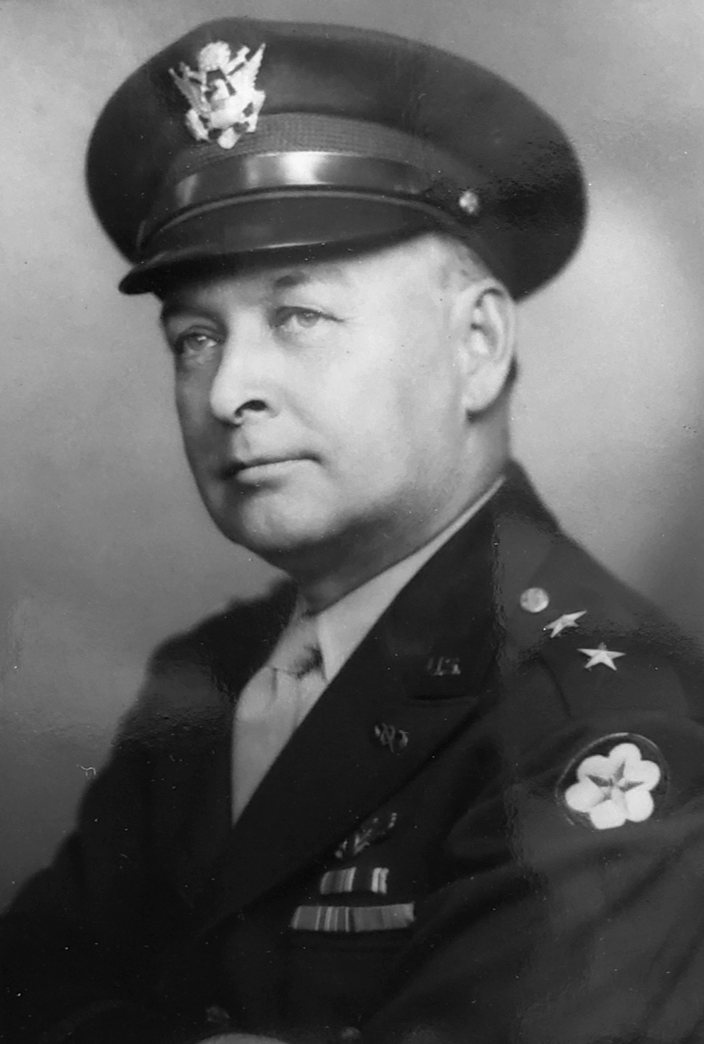
- Born: March 15, 1886; Lima, Ohio, US
- Died: February 5, 1973 (age 86); Key West, Florida, US
- Education: United States Naval Academy (1909); Command and General Staff School (1927); Army Industrial College; Army War College
- Title: Chief of the Chemical Warfare Service
- Term: 1941–1945
- Spouse: Mary

William N. Porter (March 15, 1886 – February 5, 1973) was a United States Army officer who led the Army's Chemical Warfare Service during the second World War.

== Early life and education ==
Porter was born in Lima, Ohio on March 15, 1886. He attended the United States Naval Academy in Annapolis, Maryland, graduating in 1909. After less than a year of active naval service, he resigned as a midshipman on February 7, 1910. (Until 1912, midshipmen who graduated from the academy had to serve two years in the fleet before being commissioned as ensigns.) He then joined the Army as a second lieutenant in the U.S. Army Coast Artillery Corps.

== Chemical Warfare Service ==
Porter was transferred to the Army's Chemical Warfare Service in 1921 as a major. Porter graduated with distinction in 1927 from the Command and General Staff School and then attended both the Army Industrial College and the Army War College.

As a lieutenant colonel from 1934 to 1937, Porter was assigned to the faculty at the Air Corps Tactical School located at Maxwell Field.

Porter served as Director of the Chemical Warfare School, located at the time in Washington, DC, and, as a colonel, as Chemical Officer, 9th Corps Area.

After the outbreak of World War Two, Porter was appointed head of the Army Chemical Warfare Service and promoted to major general. He led the service from May 1941 until 1945, despite having had no experience as a chemical officer in the First World War. Until March 1942, he reported directly to the Army Chief of Staff, but from then on to the Service of Supply, later renamed the Army Service Forces. The Chemical Warfare Service was responsible for both offensive and defensive chemical weapons usage, including smoke. Under his command, the service fielded flamethrowers, developed and manufactured incendiary bombs and devices, worked to improve the effectiveness of DDT as an insecticide, and developed treatments for the expected effects of chemical weapons such as respiratory disease, burns, and poisoning.

In December 1943, after the Battle of Tarawa, Porter and the Chemical Warfare Service urged the use of chemical warfare in the Pacific Theater to reduce U.S. casualties against fierce Japanese resistance. However, President Franklin Roosevelt and American public opinion opposed the use of poison gas and were not persuaded.

Porter was awarded the Army Distinguished Service Medal for his wartime efforts.

Porter retired from active duty on November 13, 1945.

== Publications ==
Porter authored articles for professional journals:

- Porter, William (January–February 1915). "The Service of Security and Information in Coast Defense". The Journal of the United States Artillery. 43: 83–94.
- Porter, William (December 1924). "Smoke and the Coast Artillery". Coast Artillery Journal. 61: 522–528.

== Retirement ==
Following his retirement from the Army, Porter was president of the Chemical Construction Corporation. The company's offices were located in New York City. In 1953, he was elected a director of Cambridge, MA electronics manufacturer Ultrasonic Corp.

Porter also served as president of the New York Chapter of the Armed Forces Chemical Association.

Porter died of a heart attack at his home in Key West, Florida in 1973 at the age of 86. He was buried at Arlington National Cemetery.

== Personal life ==
Porter was married to Mary Porter. At the time of his death, he was survived by a son and a daughter.
