= Amos Fries =

United States Army general (1873–1963)

Amos A. Fries
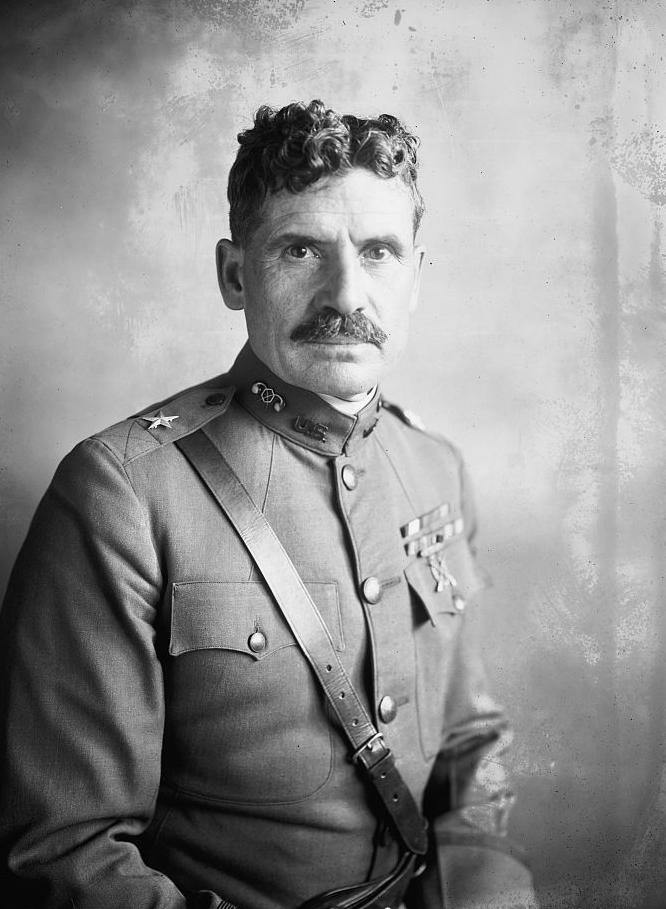
- Brig. Genl. A. A. Fries, August 5, 1921
- Born: March 17, 1873; Viroqua, Wisconsin, U.S.
- Died: December 30, 1963 (aged 90); Washington, D. C., U.S.
- Burial place: Arlington National Cemetery
- Military career
- Allegiance: United States of America
- Branch: United States Army
- Service years: 1898–1929
- Rank: Major General
- Commands: 1st Gas Regiment, Chemical Warfare Service
- Conflicts: Philippine–American War; World War I
- Awards: Distinguished Service Medal
- Other work: Author; Road/Bridge construction – Yellowstone Park

Amos Alfred Fries (March 17, 1873 – December 30, 1963) was a general in the United States Army and 1898 graduate of the United States Military Academy. Fries was the second chief of the army's Chemical Warfare Service, established during World War I. Fries served under John J. Pershing in the Philippines and oversaw the construction of the roads and bridges in Yellowstone National Park. He eventually became an important commander in World War I. After he retired from the Army in 1929, Fries wrote two anti-communist books. He died in 1963 and is buried in Arlington National Cemetery.

== Early life ==
Amos Alfred Fries was born March 17, 1873, in Viroqua, Wisconsin. His family moved to Missouri after he was born and then moved to Oregon. Fries earned an appointment to the United States Military Academy and graduated there in 1898.

== Military career ==
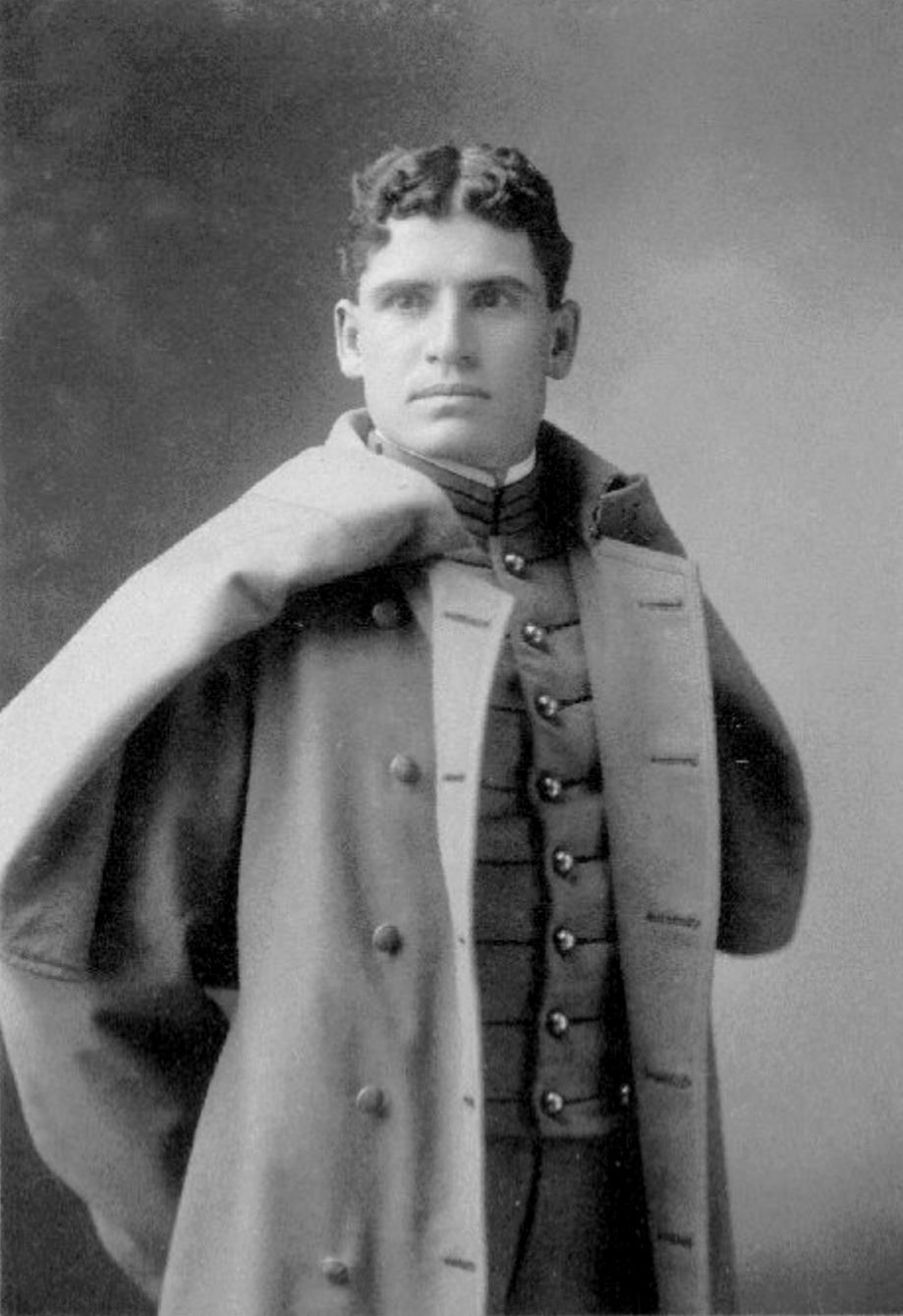
At West Point in 1898

After graduating West Point Fries joined the Army Corps of Engineers and served in the Philippines during the Philippine–American War. During that time he saw combat under the leadership of Captain John J. Pershing, later the American Expeditionary Forces (AEF) commander during World War I. From 1914 to 1917 Fries oversaw the construction of roads and bridges in Yellowstone National Park; he gained some notoriety for that work.

Fries arrived in Europe as World War I raged, he expected to do more engineering work but was instead thrust into heading the fledgling Gas Service Section, AEF. The Gas Service Section was mostly constituted by the 1st Gas Regiment (originally the 30th Engineer Regiment (Gas and Flame)) and Fries commanded the section. He became the chief of the Overseas Division of the Chemical Warfare Service in 1919, and when William L. Sibert retired in 1919, Fries became the first peacetime overall chief of the Chemical Warfare Service the following year. He served at that post until he retired from the Army in 1929. For his work with the Chemical Warfare Service he was awarded the Distinguished Service Medal.

== Anti-communism and chemical warfare advocacy ==
During the interwar period, the Chemical Warfare Service maintained its arsenal despite public pressure and presidential wishes in favor of disarmament. Fries viewed calls for chemical disarmament as a Communist plot. As CWS chief, Fries created a secret military intelligence unit within the Chemical Warfare Service to monitor domestic subversion. Fries accused the National Council for Prevention of War (NCPW) of being a Communist front. He also leveled similar accusations at Florence Watkins, the executive secretary of the National Congress of Parent Teacher Associations. The pressure generated by Fries' accusations led to the National Congress of Parent Teacher Associations withdrawing its membership in the NCPW. The General Federation of Women's Clubs took the same action.

Fries use race to justify some of his views. During a lecture at the General Staff College, he declared:

"The same training that makes for advancement in science, and success in manufacture in peace, gives the control of the body that hold the white man to the firing line no matter what its terrors. A great deal of this comes because the white man has had trained out of him nearly all superstition."

Fries declared that this training set apart from the "negro" as well as the "Gurkha and the Moroccan."

In 1923 Fries' office distributed a "spider chart" to "patriotic groups" across the United States. The chart intended to show that all women's societies and church groups be regarded with suspicion concerning links to radical groups and Communist leadership. The spider chart listed 21 individual women and 17 organizations, among them the Daughters of the American Revolution.

Later in his life, Fries lobbied for Congress to ban the "teaching or advocating" communism in public schools. In 1935, he also sought to ban books written by progressive historian Carl L. Becker, whom Fries labeled a "well known communist writer" despite Becker explicitly being an anti-communist. Fries two anti-communist books, Communism Unmasked, published in 1937, and Sugar Coating Communism. Fries was a supporter of both Nazi Germany and Fascist Italy as a bulwark against communism in Europe and believed that a fascist dictatorship was the only way to prevent the two countries from becoming communist. When Rabbi Stephen Wise pleaded for the admission of persecuted German Jews, Fries, a nativist who subscribed to the Jewish communist conspiracy theory, argued that the Nazis were only persecuting communists and their sympathizers.

== Later life and death ==
Fries died at the age of 90 on December 30, 1963, and was buried at Arlington National Cemetery.

== Selected publications ==
- Chemical Warfare (1921), co-authored with Clarence J. West
- Communism Unmasked (1937)
- Sugar Coating Communism: A Plea for God and Country, Home and Family (c. 1930)
- Sugar Coating Communism for Protestant Churches: Chart Showing Interlocking Membership of Churchmen, Socialists, Pacifists, Internationalists, and Communists (chart – 1923)
