= Franklin C. Sibert =

United States Army general

Franklin Cummings Sibert
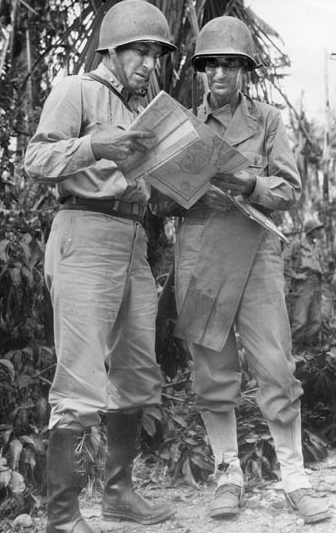
- Major General Franklin C. Sibert (left), X Corps commander, confers with Major General Frederick A. Irving, commander of the 24th Infantry Division, at a forward command post during the invasion of Leyte, Philippines, 1944.
- Born: January 3, 1891; Bowling Green, Kentucky, United States
- Died: June 24, 1980 (aged 89); Fort Walton Beach, Florida, United States
- Burial place: Arlington National Cemetery, Virginia, United States
- Relatives: William L. Sibert (father); Edwin L. Sibert (brother)
- Military career
- Allegiance: United States
- Branch: United States Army
- Service years: 1912–1946
- Rank: Major General
- Service number: 0-3394
- Unit: Infantry Branch
- Commands: X Corps; 6th Infantry Division; 32nd Infantry Regiment
- Conflicts: World War I World War II
- Awards: Army Distinguished Service Medal; Silver Star; Legion of Merit (2)

Major General Franklin Cummings Sibert (January 3, 1891 – June 24, 1980) was a United States Army officer. During World War II, Sibert was originally the commander of the 6th Infantry Division but was promoted to command the X Corps of General Walter Krueger's US Sixth Army. His corps took part in the landing operations of the Battle of Leyte in the Philippines.

== Early years ==
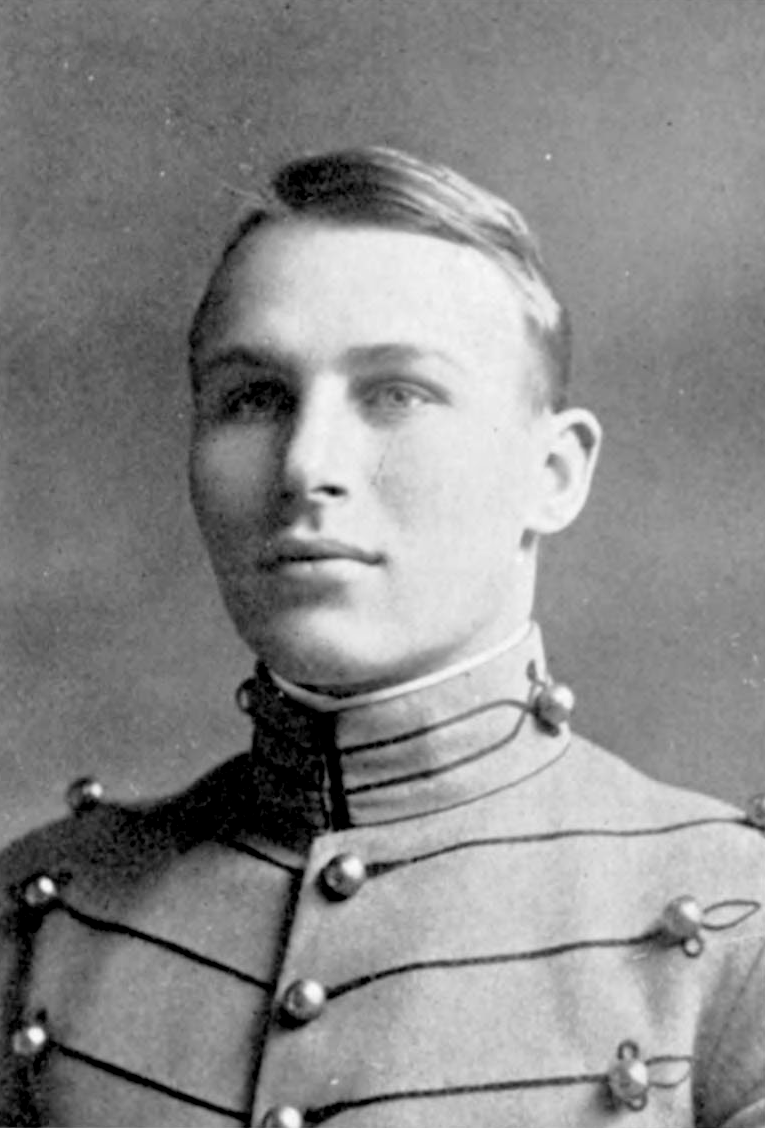
At West Point in 1912.

Sibert was born on January 3, 1891, in Bowling Green, Kentucky, as a son of future Major General William L. Sibert and his wife Mary Margaret Cummings. He attended the United States Military Academy at West Point, New York. He graduated and was commissioned a second lieutenant in the infantry on June 12, 1912. One year later, Sibert married Helen Mildred Rogers on March 4, 1913.

During World War I, Sibert served with the American Expeditionary Forces (AEF) in France, initially as an aide-de-camp to his father, who commanded the 1st Division from June−December 1917, before commanding a machine gun battalion. With the war over, he subsequently served with the allied occupation forces in Germany.

After the war, Sibert attended the Infantry School at Fort Benning in 1924, before going on to attend the Command and General Staff College at Fort Leavenworth from August 1924 until June 1925, where he was a distinguished graduate. This was followed some years later by his attendance at the Army War College from August 1928 to July 1929. His next few years were spent mainly as a staff officer or in a teaching role, returning to the Command and General Staff College, this time as an instructor.

In 1934, Sibert served as a battalion commanding officer in the 29th Infantry Regiment and subsequently served in the various infantry positions at Fort Benning or as the Member of the Infantry Board.

== World War II ==
In 1939, Sibert spent some time in Michigan as a commanding officer of Fort Wayne or Camp Custer. In September 1941 Sibert was promoted to the rank of brigadier general and was appointed to the staff of Lieutenant general Joseph W. Stilwell, Commander of the U.S. Forces in China-Burma-India Theater. Sibert accompanied Stillwell in the retreat from Burma in 1942.

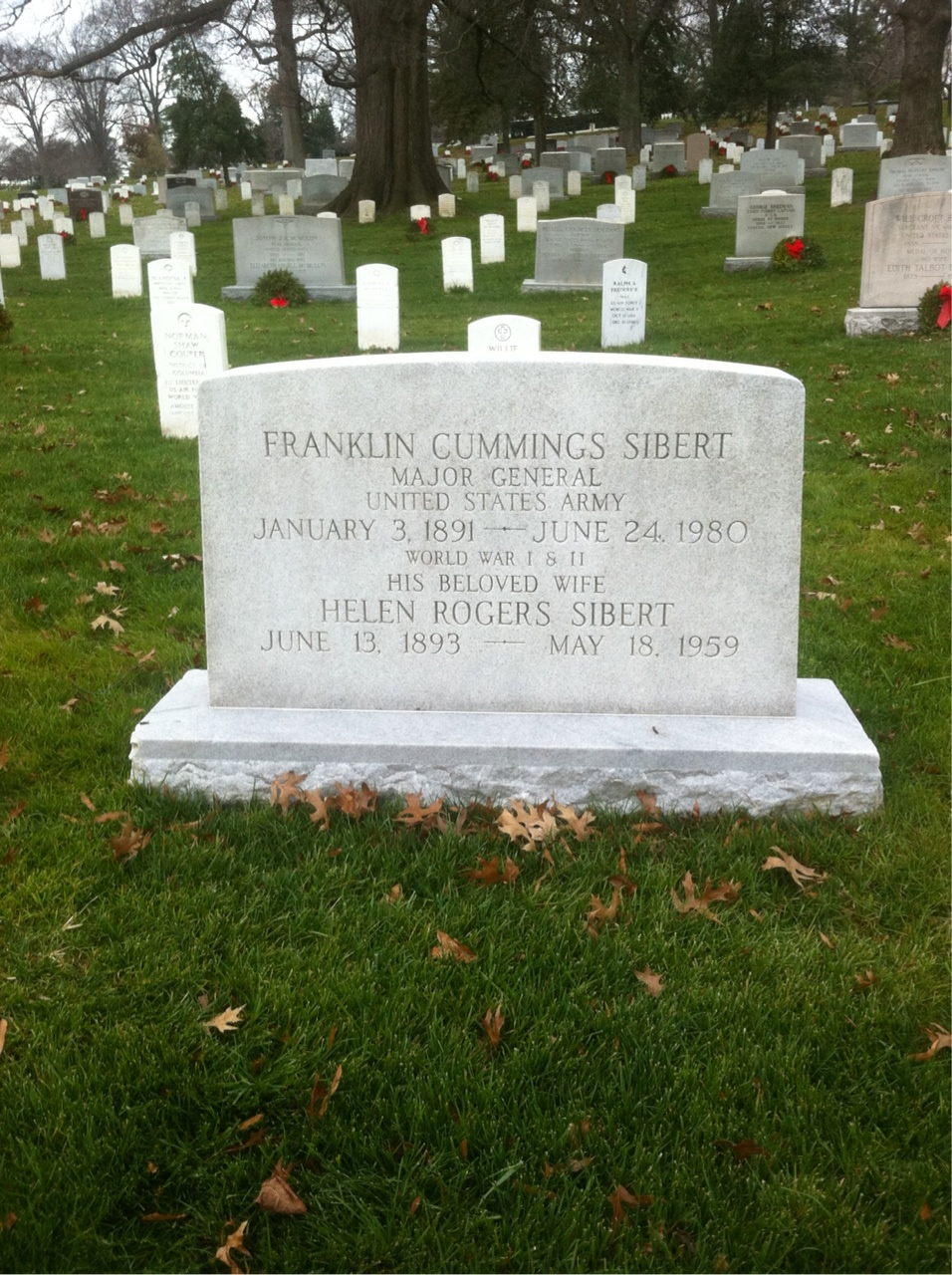
The grave of Major General Franklin C. Sibert at Arlington National Cemetery

Sibert was then appointed the commanding officer of the 6th Infantry Division. He replaced Major General Durward S. Wilson in this capacity. He was also promoted to the rank of major general on March 11, 1942, and his assistant division commander (ADC) was Brigadier General Julius Ochs Adler. He participated in the New Guinea and Philippines campaigns. He was highly regarded by Lieutenant General Walter Krueger, who in July 1944 radioed his superior, General Douglas MacArthur, about Sibert:

During a visit [to] the Wakde−Maffin Bay area a few days ago, I was impressed with Sibert's skilful handling of his troops. He is cool and very aggressive and his troops reflect that spirit....He is aggressive and has the punch to be expected of a corps commander who may at any time be required to command a large, independent task force in action.

After commanding the 6th Infantry Division, he commanded the US X Corps from August 1944 until the end of the war. Under his command his X Corps participated in the New Guinea, Southern Philippines and Leyte campaigns.

== Post World War II ==
Sibert retired from the Army on June 30, 1946. After his retirement, he and his wife lived in Fort Walton Beach, Florida, until his death on June 24, 1980. He was buried at Arlington National Cemetery.

== Decorations ==

1st row		Army Distinguished Service Medal		
2nd row	Silver Star	Legion of Merit with Oak Leaf Cluster	Bronze Star Medal with Oak Leaf Cluster	Air Medal
3rd row	Mexican Border Service Medal	World War I Victory Medal with four campaign clasps	Army of Occupation of Germany Medal	American Defense Service Medal
4th row	American Campaign Medal	Asiatic-Pacific Campaign Medal with four campaign stars	World War II Victory Medal	Philippine Liberation Medal with two stars

== Bibliography ==
- Taaffe, Stephen R. (2013). Marshall and His Generals: U.S. Army Commanders in World War II. Lawrence, Kansas: University Press of Kansas. ISBN 978-0-7006-1942-9. OCLC 840162019.

Military offices
Preceded by Durward S. Wilson	Commanding General 6th Infantry Division; 1942–1944	Succeeded by Edwin D. Patrick
Preceded by Jonathan W. Anderson	Commanding General X Corps; 1944–1946	Succeeded by Percy W. Clarkson
