= Chemical Corps =

U.S. Army's branch for CBRN/WMD defense, research and counterforce

United States Army Chemical Corps
- Chemical Corps branch insignia
- Active: 1918–present
- Country: United States
- Branch: Army
- Type: Chemical
- Role: Corps
- Part of: U.S. Department of the Army
- Regimental Headquarters: Fort Leonard Wood, Missouri
- Mottos: Latin: Elementis regamus proelium, lit. 'We rule the battle through the elements.'
- Colors: Cobalt blue and golden yellow
- Anniversaries: 28 June (Organization Day)
- Wars: World War I; World War II; Korean War; Vietnam; Southwest Asia; Kosovo; War on terrorism
- Website: U.S. Army CBRN School

Insignia
- Branch plaque

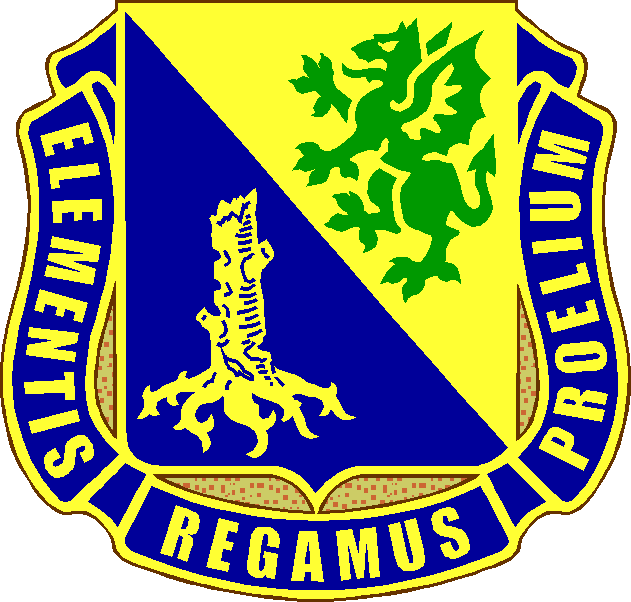
- Regimental insignia

The Chemical Corps is the branch of the United States Army tasked with defending against and using chemical, biological, radiological, and nuclear (CBRN) weapons. The Chemical Warfare Service was established on 28 June 1918, combining activities that until then had been dispersed among five separate agencies of the United States federal government. It was made a permanent branch of the Regular Army by the National Defense Act of 1920. In 1945, it was redesignated the Chemical Corps.

== History ==
=== Origins ===
Discussion of the topic dates back to the American Civil War. A letter to the War Department dated 5 April 1862 from New York City resident John Doughty proposed the use of chlorine shells to drive the Confederate Army from its positions. Doughty included a detailed drawing of the shell with his letter. It is unknown how the military reacted to Doughty's proposal but the letter was unnoticed in a pile of old official documents until modern times. Another American, Forrest Shepherd, also proposed a chemical weapon attack against the Confederates. Shepherd's proposal involved hydrogen chloride, an attack that would have likely been non-lethal but may have succeeded in driving enemy soldiers from their positions. Shepherd was a well-known geologist at the time and his proposal was in the form of a letter directly to the White House.

=== World War I ===
The earliest predecessors to the United States Army Chemical Corps owe their existence to changes of military technology early in World War I. By 1915, the combatants were using poison gases and chemical irritants on the battlefield. In that year, the United States War Department first became interested in providing individual soldiers with personal protection against chemical warfare and they tasked the Medical Department with developing the technology. Nevertheless, troops were neither supplied with masks nor trained for offensive gas warfare until the U.S. became involved in World War I in 1917.

By 1917, the use of chemical weapons by both the Allied and Central Powers had become commonplace along the Western, Eastern and Italian Fronts, occurring daily in some regions.

In 1917, Secretary of the Interior Franklin K. Lane, directed the Bureau of Mines to assist the Army and Navy in creating a gas war program. Researchers at the Bureau of Mines had experience in developing gas masks for miners, drawing poisonous air through an activated carbon filter. After the Director of the Bureau of Mines, Van H. Manning, formally offered the bureau's service to the Military Committee of the National Research Council, the council appointed a Subcommittee on Noxious Gases. Manning recruited chemists from industry, universities, and government to help study mustard-gas poisoning, investigate and mass-produce new toxic chemicals, and develop gas-masks and other treatments.

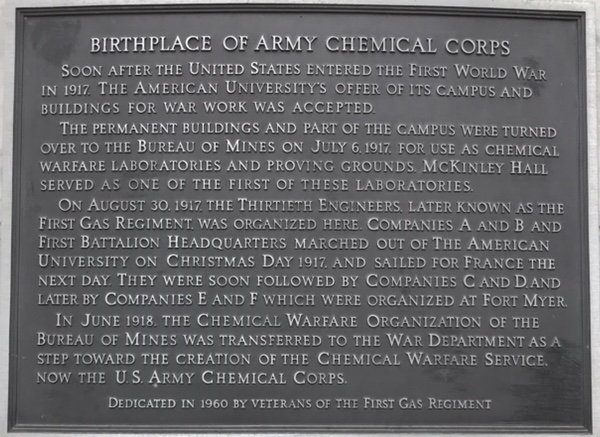
Plaque at American University in Washington, D.C. commemorating the formation of the Army Chemical Corps

A center for chemical weapons research was established at American University in Washington, D.C. to house researchers. The U.S. military paid to convert classrooms into laboratories. Within a year of setting up the center, the number of scientists and technicians employed there would increase from 272 to over 1,000. Industrial plants were established in nearby cities to synthesize toxic chemicals for use in research and armaments. Shells were filled with toxic gas in Edgewood, Maryland. Women were employed to produce gas masks in Long Island City.

On 5 July 1917 General John J. Pershing oversaw the creation of a new military unit dealing with gas, the Gas Service Section. The government recruited soldiers for it to be based at Camp American University, Washington, D.C. The predecessor to the 1st Gas Regiment was the 30th Engineer Regiment (Gas and Flame). The 30th was activated on 15 August 1917 at Camp American University A 17 October 1917 memorandum from the Adjutant General to the Chief of Engineers directed that the Gas Service Section consist of four majors, six captains, 10 first lieutenants and 15 second lieutenants. Additional War Department orders established a Chemical Service Section that included 47 commissioned officers and 95 enlisted personnel.

Before deploying to France in 1917 many of the soldiers in the 30th Engineer Regiment (Gas and Flame) spent their time stateside in training that did not emphasize any chemical warfare skills; instead the training focused on drill, marching, guard duty, and inspections. Despite the conventional training, the public perceived the 30th as dealing mainly with "poisonous gas and hell fire". By the time those in the 30th Engineers arrived in France most of them knew nothing of chemical warfare and had no specialized equipment.

In 1918, the 30th Engineer Regiment (Gas and Flame) was redesignated the First Gas Regiment and deployed to assist and support Army gas operations, both offensive and defensive.

==== Formation ====
On 28 June 1918, the Chemical Warfare Service (CWS) was officially formed and encompassed the "Gas Service" and "Chemical Service" Sections. By 1 November 1918 the CWS included 1,654 commissioned officers and 18,027 enlisted personnel. Major General William L. Sibert served as the first director of the CWS on the day it was created, and he resigned in April 1920.

In the interwar period, the Chemical Warfare Service maintained its arsenal despite public pressure and presidential wishes in favor of disarmament. Major General Amos Fries, the CWS chief from 1920–29, viewed chemical disarmament as a Communist plot. Through his instigation and lobbying, the CWS and its various Congressional, chemist, and chemical company allies were able to halt the U.S. Senate's ratification of the 1925 Geneva Protocol which forbade "first use" of chemical weapons. Even countries who had signed the Geneva Protocol still produced and stockpiled chemical weapons, since the Protocol did not prohibit retaliation in kind.

=== Roosevelt on renaming Service to Corps, 1937 ===
In 1937, President Roosevelt opposed changing the name of the Service to Corps, stating:

It is my thought that the major functions of the Chemical Warfare Service are those of a "Service" rather than a "Corps." It is desirable to designate as a Corps only those supply branches of the Army which are included in the line of the Army. To have changed the name to the "Chemical Service" would have been more in keeping with its functions than to designate it as the "Chemical Corps."

I have a far more important objection to this change of name. It has been and is the policy of this Government to do everything in its power to outlaw the use of chemicals in warfare. Such use is inhuman and contrary to what modern civilization should stand for.

I am doing everything in my power to discourage the use of gases and other chemicals in any war between nations. While, unfortunately, the defensive necessities of the United States call for study of the use of chemicals in warfare, I do not want the Government of the United States to do anything to aggrandize or make permanent any special bureau of the Army or the Navy engaged in these studies. I hope the time will come when the Chemical Warfare Service can be entirely abolished.

To dignify this Service by calling it the "Chemical Corps" is, in my judgment, contrary to a sound public policy.

=== World War II ===
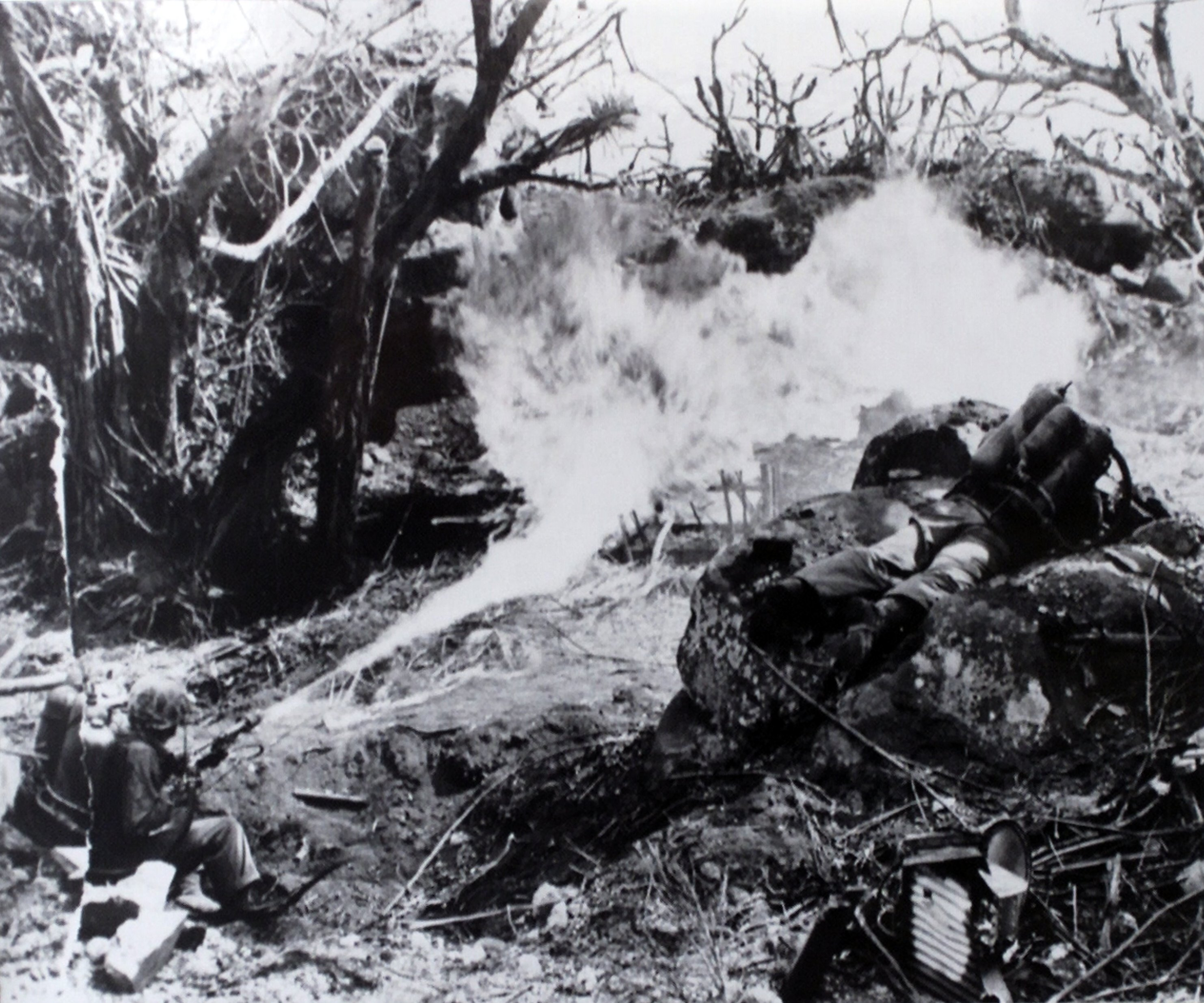
The CWS provided support for flame weapons, such as this flame thrower being employed during the Battle of Tarawa, during WWII.

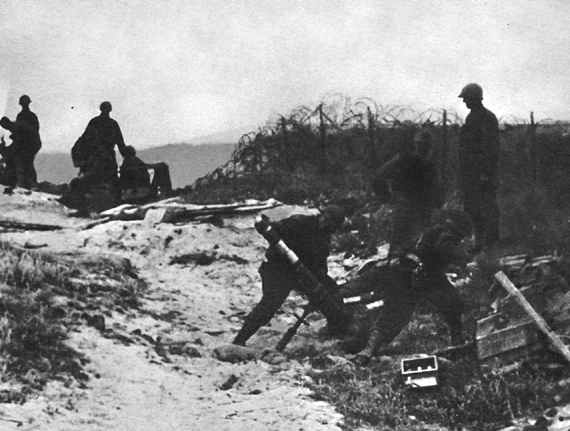
A chemical mortar battalion in action at Utah Beach, 1944

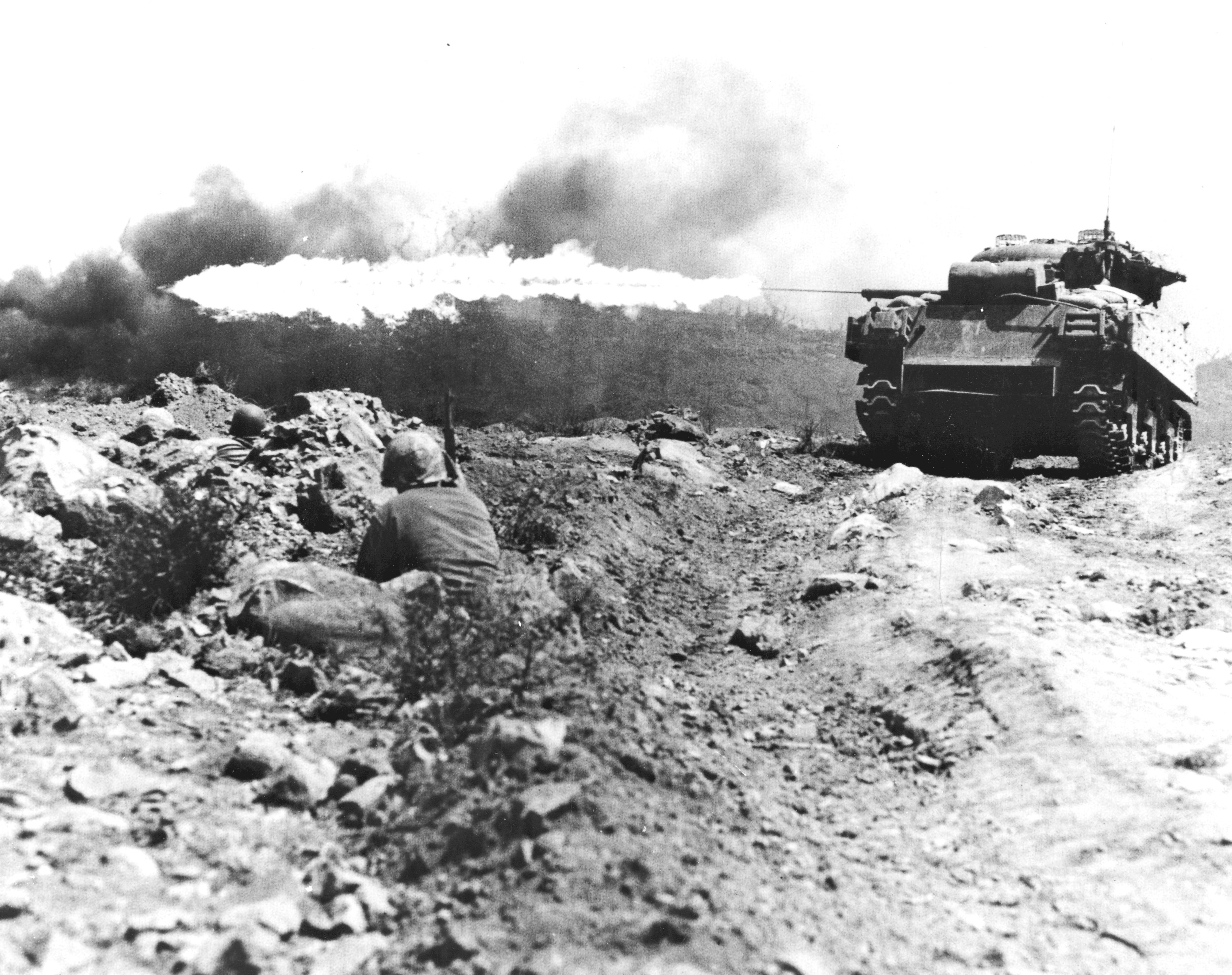
The CB-H2 flamethrower seen here on Iwo Jima had a range of 150 yards

The Chemical Warfare Service deployed and prepared gas weapons for use throughout the world during World War II. However, these weapons were never used in combat. Despite the lack of chemical warfare during the conflict, the CWS saw its funding and personnel increase substantially due to concerns that the Germans and Japanese had a formidable chemical weapons capability. By 1942 the CWS employed 60,000 soldiers and civilians and was appropriated $1 billion. The CWS completed a variety of non-chemical warfare related tasks and missions during the war including producing incendiaries for flame throwers, flame tanks and other weapons. Chemical soldiers were also involved in smoke generation missions. Chemical mortar battalions used the 4.2-inch chemical mortar to support armor and infantry units.

During all parts of the war, use of chemical and biological weapons were extremely limited by both sides. Italy used mustard gas and phosgene during the short Second Italo-Abyssinian War, Germany employed chemical agents such as Zyklon B against Jews, political prisoners and other victims in extermination camps during the Holocaust, and Japan employed chemical and biological weapons in China. In 1943 a Liberty Ship named the SS John Harvey carrying a secret Chemical Warfare Service cargo of mustard gas as a precautionary retaliatory measure was sunk in an air raid in Italy, causing 83 deaths and about 600 hospitalized military victims plus a larger number of civilian casualties.

Though the political leadership of the United States remained decidedly against the use of chemical weapons, there were those within the military command structure who advocated the use of such weapons. Following the Battle of Tarawa, during which the U.S. forces suffered more than 3,400 casualties in three days, CWS chief Major General William N. Porter pushed superiors to approve the use of poison gas against Japan. "We have an overwhelming advantage in the use of gas. Properly used gas could shorten the war in the Pacific and prevent loss of many American lives," Porter said.

Popular support was not completely lacking. Some newspaper editorials supported the use of chemical weapons in the Pacific theater. The New York Daily News proclaimed in 1943, "We Should Gas Japan", and the Washington Times Herald wrote in 1944, "We Should Have Used Gas at Tarawa because "You Can Cook 'Em Better with Gas". Despite rising between 1944 and 1945, popular public opinion never rose above 40 percent in favor of the use of gas weapons. Where there was support for Chemical Warfare was in V Amphibious Corps and X U.S. Army. Colonel George F. Unmacht (US Army) became commander of the Army's Chemical Warfare Service, Pacific Ocean Area in 1943. Along with that he was the Hawaii Territorial Coordinator for Civilian Gas Defense and Joint service Pacific theater chief chemical warfare officer under Adm. Nimitz. Under his leadership the research, development, and production of flamethrowing tanks and napalm took place at Schofield Barracks. His crews of Seabees produced more flamethrowing tanks than commercial production in the States. The Army and Marine Corps felt the tanks saved many American troops on Iwo Jima and Okinawa.

=== Post World War II and Korean War, 1945–53 ===
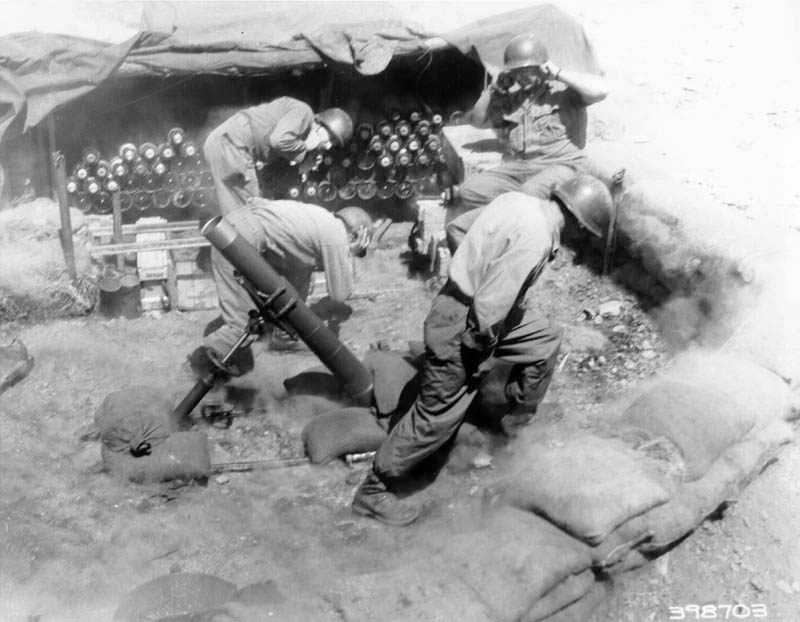
As in World War II, chemical soldiers would have employed the 4.2-inch chemical mortar in Korea, had chemical weapons been used.

In 1946, the Chemical Warfare Service was re-designated as the "U.S. Army Chemical Corps", a name the branch still uses. With the change came the added mission of defending against nuclear warfare, in addition, the corps continued to refine its offensive and defensive chemical capabilities. Immediately following World War II, production of U.S. biological warfare (BW) agents went from "factory-level to laboratory-level". Meanwhile, work on BW delivery systems increased. Live testing in Panama was carried out during the San Jose Project.

From the end of World War II through the Korean War, the U.S. Army, the Chemical Corps and the U.S. Air Force made great strides in their biological warfare programs, especially concerning delivery systems. During the Korean War (1950–53) chemical soldiers had to again man the 4.2 inch chemical mortar for smoke and high explosive munitions delivery. During the war, the Pine Bluff Arsenal was opened and used for BW production, and research facilities were expanded at Fort Detrick. North Korea, the Soviet Union and China leveled accusations at the United States claiming the U.S. used biological agents during the Korean War; an assertion the U.S. government denied.

After the end of the Korean War, the Army decided to strip the Chemical Corps of the 4.2 inch mortar system and made that an infantry weapon, given its utility against Chinese mortars.

From 1952 until 1999 the Chemical Corps School was located at Fort McClellan.

=== Creation of the Chemical Corps Intelligence Agency ===
The Chemical Corps Intelligence Agency (CCIA) was founded in 1955 within a facility at Arlington Hall Station, Virginia. which also housed the Army Security Agency, the National Security Agency (NSA) and the Defense Intelligence Agency's National Intelligence University. The CCIA accomplished the intelligence function of the U.S. Army Chemical Corps. Its mission was to support the national intelligence effort with particular emphasis on the military aspects of Chemical, Biological and Radiological (CBR) intelligence information.

U.S. Army Chemical Corps Information and Liaison Office, Europe (CCILO–E) was established and located in Frankfurt, Germany. During November and December 1961 two CCIA officers visited the Far East on an intelligence collection trip. This visit led to a recommendation by CCIA to establish an information and liaison office in Tokyo patterned on the Frankfurt agency. The Chief Chemical Officer and Assistant Chief of Staff for Intelligence (ACS/I) approved the recommendation and foresaw an activation date in financial year 1964. Two CCIA staff members again toured selected U.S. intelligence agencies in Japan, Korea, Okinawa, Taiwan, the Philippines, and Hong Kong in the third quarter of financial year 1962. The purposes were to establish liaison with the Chemical Corps personnel, to reemphasize the importance of CBR intelligence, and to provide on the spot guidance and discuss the establishment of a U.S. Army Chemical Corps Information and Liaison Office in Tokyo.

=== Vietnam ===
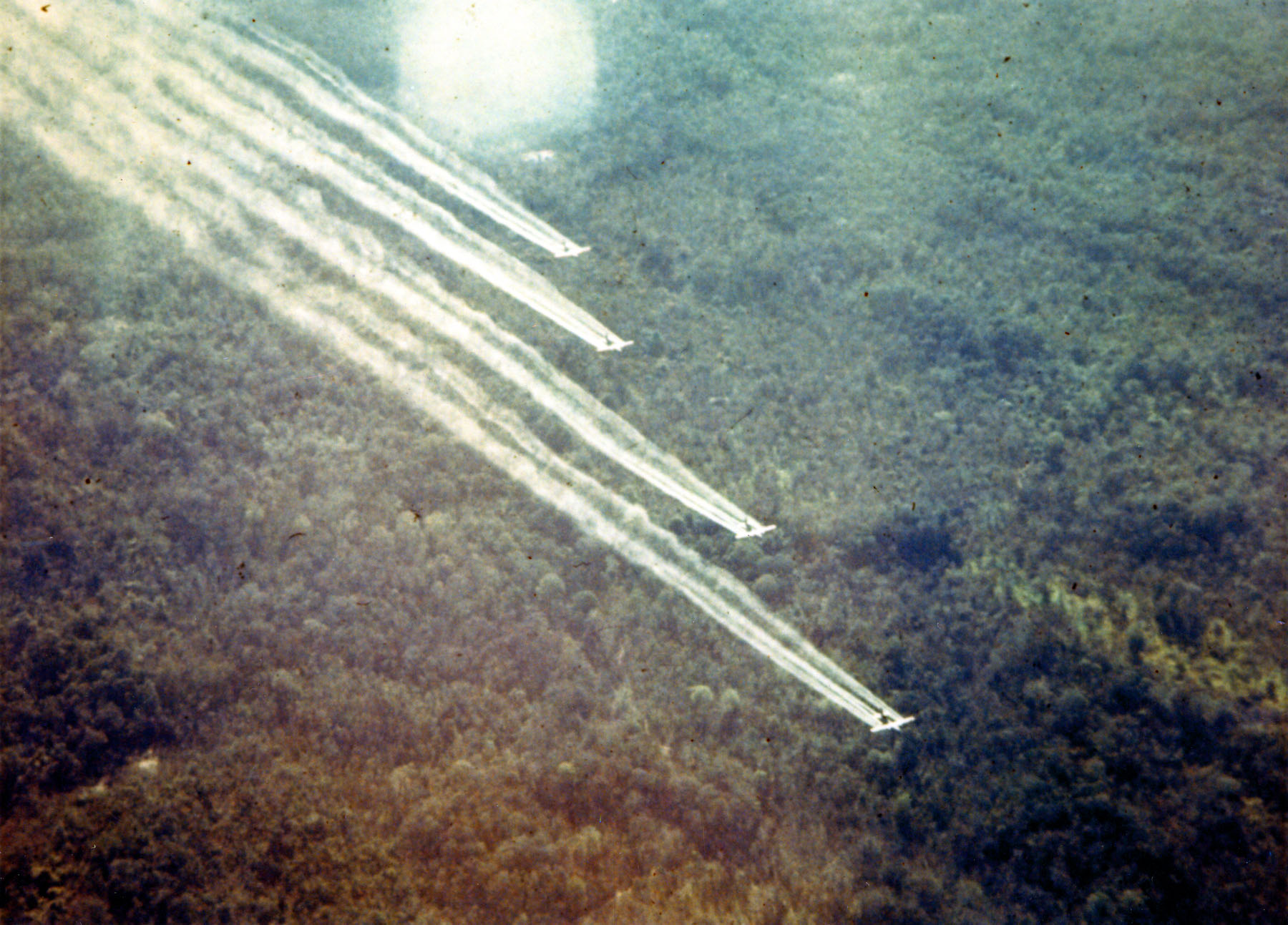
A defoliant run during the Vietnam War, part of Operation Ranch Hand.

Beginning in 1962 during the Vietnam War, the Chemical Corps operated a program that would become known as Operation Ranch Hand. Ranch Hand was a herbicidal warfare program which used herbicides and defoliants such as Agent Orange. The chemicals were color-coded based on what compound they contained. The U.S. and its allies officially argued that herbicides and defoliants fell outside the definition of "chemical weapons", since these substances were not designed to asphyxiate or poison humans, but to destroy plants which provided cover or concealment to the enemy.

The Chemical Corps continued to support U.S. forces through the use of incendiary weapons, such as napalm, and riot control measures, among other missions. As the war progressed into the late 1960s, public sentiment against the Chemical Corps increased because of the Army's continued use of herbicides, criticized in the press as being against the Geneva Protocol; napalm; and riot control agents.

Besides supplying flame weapons, and preparing for any eventuality of weapons of mass destruction, the Vietnam-era Chemical Corps also developed "people sniffers", a type of personnel detector. Major Herb Thornton led chemical soldiers, who became known as tunnel rats and developed techniques for clearing enemy tunnels in Vietnam.

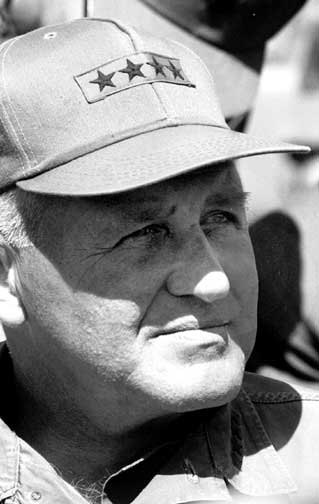
General Creighton Abrams, seen here in 1968, was appointed Army Chief of Staff in 1972.

In March 1968, the Dugway sheep incident was one of several key events which increased the growing public furor against the corps. An open air spraying of VX was blamed for killing over 4,000 sheep near the US Dugway Proving Ground. The Army eventually settled the case and paid the ranchers. Meanwhile, another incident involving Operation CHASE (Cut Holes and Sink 'Em) was exposed, which sought to dump chemical weapons 250 miles (400 km) off of the Florida coast, spurring concerns over the damage to the ocean environment and risk of chemical munitions washing up on shore.

Beginning in the late 1960s, the chemical warfare capabilities of the United States began to decline due to, in part, a decline in public opinion concerning the corps. The corps continued to be plagued with bad press and mishaps. A 1969 incident, in which 23 soldiers and one Japanese civilian were exposed to sarin on the island of Okinawa, while cleaning sarin-filled bombs, created international concern while revealing the presence of chemical munitions in Southeast Asia. Also in 1969, President Richard Nixon reaffirmed a no first-use policy on chemical weapons as well as renouncing the use of biological weapons (BW). When the U.S. BW program ended in 1969, it had developed seven standardized biological weapons in the form of agents that cause anthrax, tularemia, brucellosis, Q-fever, VEE, and botulism. In addition, Staphylococcal Enterotoxin B was produced as an incapacitating agent.

During the summer of 1972, Nixon nominated General Creighton Abrams for the post of Army Chief of Staff. Upon assuming that position, Abrams and others began to address the reformation of the Army in the wake of Vietnam. Abrams investigated the possibility of merging Chemical Corps into other Army branches. An ad hoc committee, designed to study possibilities, recommended that the Chemical Corps' smoke and flame mission be integrated into the Engineer Corps and the chemical operations be integrated into the Ordnance Corps. The groups recommendations were accepted in December 1972 and the United States Army Chemical Corps was officially disbanded, but not formally disestablished, by the Army on 11 January 1973.

To formally disestablish the corps, the U.S. Congress had to approve the move, because it had officially established the Chemical Corps in 1946. Congress chose to table action on the fate of the Chemical Corps, leaving it in limbo for several years. Recruitment and career advancement was halted and the Chemical School at Fort McClellan was shut down and moved to Aberdeen Proving Grounds.

=== Post Vietnam, 1975–80 ===
By the mid–1970s the chemical warfare and defense capability of the United States had degraded and by 1978 the Chairman of the Joint Chiefs of Staff characterized U.S. ability to conduct operations in a chemical environment as "not prepared."

Secretary of the Army Martin R. Hoffmann rescinded the 1972 recommendations, and in 1976 Army Chief of Staff General Bernard W. Rogers ordered the resumption of Chemical Corps officer commissioning. However, the U.S. Army Chemical School at Fort McClellan, Anniston, Alabama did not reopen until 1980.

=== Restructuring, 1980–1989 ===
Changes in Chemical Corps post-1980
	Pre-1980	Post-1980
Doctrine/training	Chemical Corps only	Army wide
Operations emphasis	minimize casualties	minimize mission degradation
Risk	no risk	intelligent risk
Control of NBC assets	centralized: Division NBC command	decentralized: Flexible
Decon	complete decontamination	partial decontamination

By 1982 the Chemical Corps was running smoothly once again. In an effort to hasten chemical defense capabilities the corps restructured its doctrine, modernized its equipment, and altered its force structure. This shift led to every unit in the army having chemical specialists in-house by the mid-1980s. Between 1979 and 1989 the Army established 28 active duty chemical defense companies.

=== Southwest Asia ===
After Iraq invaded Kuwait in 1990 and much of the world responded by amassing military assets in the region, the United States Army faced the possibility of experiencing chemical or biological (CB) attack. The possibility of CB attack forced the army to respond with NBC defense crash courses in theater. Troops deployed to the Gulf with protective masks at the ready, protective clothing was made available to those troops whose vicinity to the enemy or mission required it. Large scale drills were conducted in the desert to better acclimatize troops to wearing the bulky protective clothing (called MOPP gear) in hot weather conditions.

Though Saddam Hussein had renounced the use of chemical weapons in 1989, many did not believe he would really honor that during a conflict with the United States and the broader coalition forces. As American troops headed to the desert, analysts speculated about their vulnerability to CB attack. Although the location of Hussein's chemical munitions was unknown, their existence was never doubted.

Gulf War I was fought without the Iraqi Army unleashing chemical or biological munitions; Eric R. Taylor, of the CATO Institute, maintained that the effective, U.S. threat of nuclear retaliation halted Hussein from employing his chemical weapons. The locations of many of Iraq's chemical stockpiles were never uncovered and there is widespread speculation that U.S. troops were exposed to chemical munitions while destroying weapons caches, particularly near the Khamisiyah storage site. After the war, analysis suggested the chemical defense capabilities of U.S. forces were woefully inadequate during and after the conflict. In addition, some experts, such as Jonathan B. Tucker, suggest that the Iraqis did indeed employ chemical weapons during the war.

=== 1990–present ===
As a result of the 1995 sarin gas attack on a Tokyo subway and the growing concern about a terrorist chemical attack, the U.S. Congress passed laws to implement a program to train civilian, law enforcement, and fire agencies on responding to incidents involving chemical agents. Further, United States Army Reserve chemical units began fielding equipment and training Soldiers to perform mass casualty decontamination operations.

A 1996 United States Government Accountability Office report concluded that U.S. troops remained highly vulnerable to attack from both chemical and biological agents. The report blamed the U.S. Department of Defense for failure to address shortcomings identified five years earlier during combat in the Persian Gulf War. These shortcomings included inadequate training, a lack of decontamination kits and other equipment, and vaccine shortages.

== Organization and mission ==
From 1952 until 1999 the Chemical Corps School was located at Fort McClellan. Since its closure due to Base Realignment and Closure in 1999, the Army's Chemical Corps and the United States Army Chemical, Biological, Radiological and Nuclear (CBRN) School are located at Fort Leonard Wood, Missouri. There are approximately 22,000 members of the Chemical Corps in the U.S. Army, spread among the Active, Army Reserve, and Army National Guard.

The school trains officers and enlisted personnel in CBRN warfare and defense with a mission is "To protect the force and allow the Army to fight and win against a CBRN threat. Develop doctrine, equipment and training for CBRN defense which serve as a deterrent to any adversary possessing weapons of mass destruction. Provide the Army with the combat multipliers of smoke, obscurant, and flame capabilities."

== Traditions ==
=== Branch insignia ===
Branch Insignia

The Chemical Corps, like all branches of the U.S. Army, uses specific insignia to indicate a soldier's affiliation with the corps. The Chemical Corps branch insignia consists of a cobalt blue, enamel benzene ring superimposed over two crossed gold retorts. The branch insignia, which was adopted in 1918 by the fledgling Chemical Service, measures .5 inches in height by 1.81 inches in width. Crossed shells with a dragon head was also commonly used in France for the Chemical service. The Chemical Warfare Service approved the insignia in 1921 and in 1924 the ring adopted the cobalt blue enamel. When the Chemical Warfare Service changed designations to the Chemical Corps in 1946 the symbol was retained.

=== Regimental insignia ===
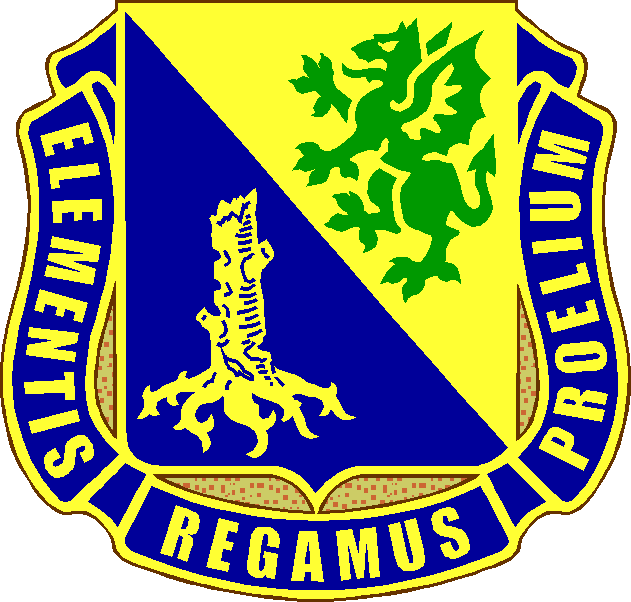
Regimental insignia

The phrase translates to: "We rule the battle through the elements.". The regimental insignia incorporates specific symbolism in its design. The colors, gold and blue, are the colors of the Chemical Corps, while the tree's trunk is battle scarred, a reference to the historical beginnings of U.S. chemical warfare, battered tree trunks were often the only reference points that chemical mortar teams had across no man's land during World War I. The tree design was taken from the coat of arms of the First Gas Regiment. The mythical chlorine breathing green dragon symbolizes the first use of chemical weapons in warfare (chlorine). Individual Chemical Corps soldiers are often referred to as "Dragon Soldiers."

== Regimental association ==
The Chemical Corps Regimental Association operates the "Chemical Corps Hall of Fame". The list includes soldiers from many different eras of the Chemical Corps history, including Amos Fries, Earl J. Atkisson, and William L. Sibert. The organization conducts annual inductions, and the honor is considered the highest offered by the corps.

== Notable members ==
Baseball Hall of Fame baseball player, manager, and executive Branch Rickey served in the 1st Gas Regiment during World War I. Rickey spent over four months as a member of the CWS. Other Hall of Famers also served in the CWS during World War I, among them Ty Cobb and Christy Mathewson; Mathewson suffered lung damage after inhaling gas in a training accident, which contributed to his later death from tuberculosis. Robert S. Mulliken served in the CWS making poison gas during World War I, and he later earned the Nobel Prize in 1966 for his work on the electronic structure of molecules.
