= William L. Sibert =

American military officer and engineer (1860–1935)

William Luther Sibert
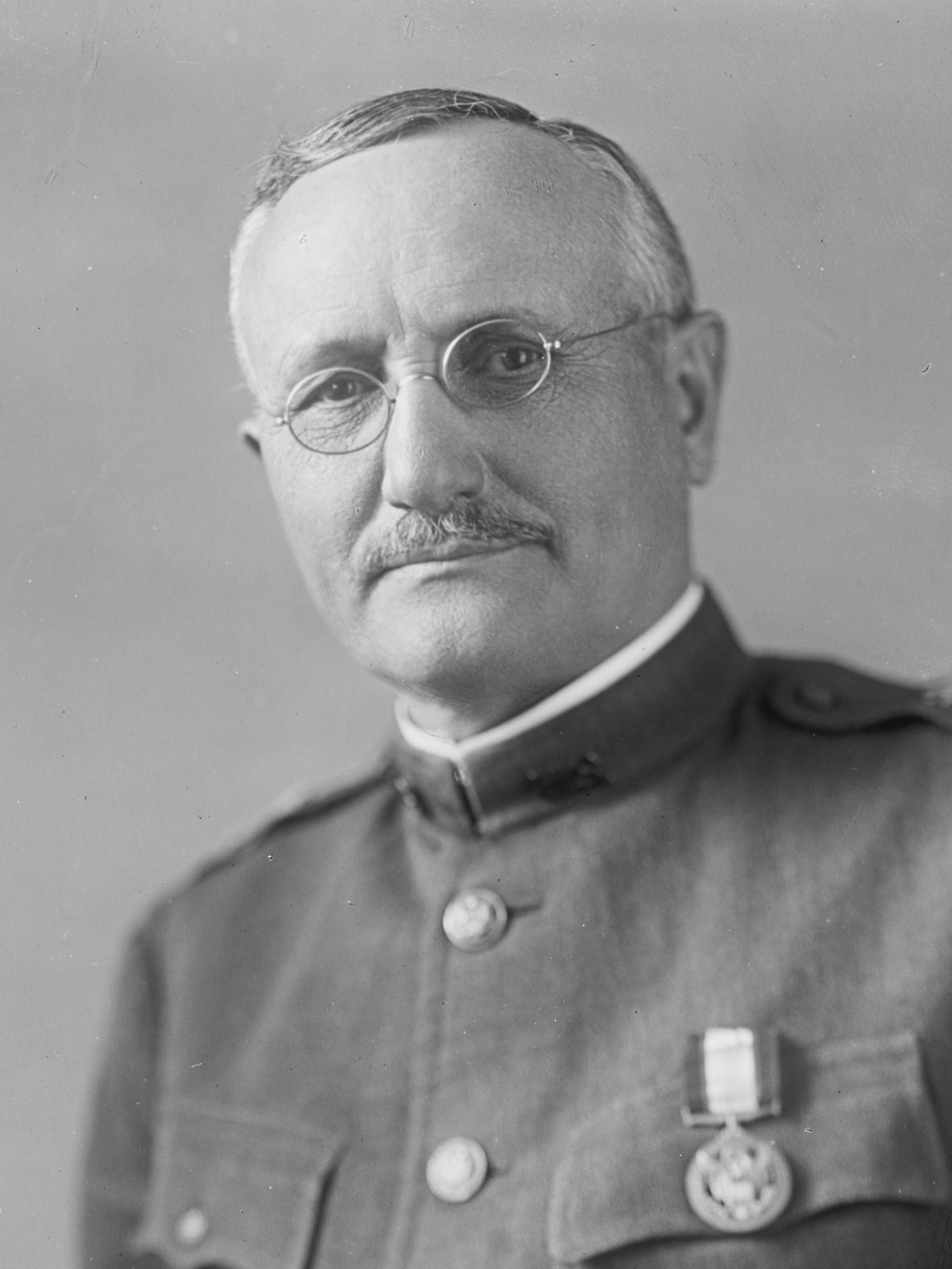
- Sibert with his Distinguished Service Medal.
- Born: October 12, 1860; Gadsden, Alabama, United States
- Died: October 16, 1935 (aged 75); Bowling Green, Kentucky, United States
- Burial place: Arlington National Cemetery
- Spouse(s): Mary Margaret Cummings (1887–1915); Juliette Roberts (1917–1918); Evelyn Clyne Bairnsfather (1922–1935)
- Children: 8 (including Edwin L. Sibert and Franklin C. Sibert)
- Military career
- Allegiance: United States
- Branch: United States Army
- Service years: 1884–1920
- Rank: Major General
- Unit: Engineer Branch
- Commands: Little Rock River and Harbor District; Company B, Willets Point Battalion of Engineers; Battalion of Engineers, Department of the Pacific; Battalion of Engineers, 8th Army Corps; Louisville River and Harbor District; Pittsburgh River and Harbor District; Atlantic Division, Panama Canal; Huai River Flood Prevention District; Pacific Coast Artillery District; 1st Infantry Division; Chemical Warfare Service; 5th Division; Camp Gordon
- Conflicts: Spanish–American War; Philippine–American War; World War I
- Awards: Army Distinguished Service Medal
- Other work: Manager, Alabama State Docks Commission

Major General William Luther Sibert (October 12, 1860 – October 16, 1935) was a senior United States Army officer who commanded the 1st Division on the Western Front during World War I. Sibert was the first division commander of the "Big Red One," leading the 1st Infantry from June 1917 to January 1918.

Sibert's career was spent primarily with the Engineers. When he left command of the 1st Division, he was appointed to lead the new Chemical Warfare Service. After retiring as a major general in 1920, Sibert oversaw a project modernizing the docks and waterways in Mobile, Alabama, and served on the presidential commission that led to the construction of Hoover Dam. He died in Bowling Green, Kentucky on 16 October 1935. Sibert was buried at Arlington National Cemetery.

== Early life and education ==
Sibert was born in Gadsden, Alabama, on October 12, 1860, the son of Confederate veteran William J. Sibert and Marietta (Ward) Sibert. He attended the public schools of Gadsden and worked in several enterprises started by his father, including a farm, hotel, and store. He attended the University of Alabama from 1878 to 1880, when he obtained an appointment to the United States Military Academy from Congressman William H. Forney. He graduated in 1884 ranked seventh of 37, and his high class standing earned him a second lieutenant's commission in the branch preferred by most high-ranking graduates, the Corps of Engineers.

== Early career ==
From September 1884 to July 1887, Sibert attended the Engineer School of Application and served with the Battalion of Engineers at Willets Point, New York. He then served as assistant engineer to Amos Stickney (July 1887 to April 1888) and Daniel Lockwood (April to November 1888) during planning for construction of the Cincinnati–Newport Bridge between Cincinnati, Ohio and Newport, Kentucky, and the Big Four Bridge between Louisville, Kentucky and Jeffersonville, Indiana. He was secretary of the board of officers that planned the Cincinnati–Newport Bridge, and a member of the board that planned the second. Sibert was promoted to first lieutenant in April 1888.

From June to November 1888, Sibert was a member of the Engineer officer board that planned a bridge across the Green River near Henderson, Kentucky. Between December 1888 and August 1892, he was based in Bowling Green, Kentucky while he supervised navigation improvements on the Green and Barren rivers. From August 1892 to August 1894, he was assistant to Orlando Metcalfe Poe and supervised local construction of a portion of the channel near Detroit that connects the Great Lakes. From August 1894 to September 1898, Sibert commanded the Little Rock, Arkansas River and Harbor District, and he was promoted to captain in March 1896. During the early part of the Spanish–American War in May 1898, Sibert's activities included directing relief efforts and making inspection tours during the state and federal response to massive flooding of the Arkansas River, as well assisting with the equipping and training of the 1st Arkansas Volunteer Infantry Regiment. Arkansas fielded two volunteer regiments; when a third was proposed, several political and civic leaders suggested Sibert to command it as a colonel of United States Volunteers. The war ended before the third regiment could be raised, so the recommendation to appoint Sibert as commander became moot.

== Continued career ==
In September 1898, Sibert returned to Willets Point, where he was assigned as commander of Company B, Battalion of Engineers and instructor in Civil Engineering at the Engineer School of Application. In July 1899, he traveled with Company B to Manila for service during the Philippine–American War. In the Philippines, he was attached to the staff of the 8th Army Corps as chief engineer, and he subsequently served as chief engineer and general manager of the Manila and Dagupan Railroad. During his Philippines service, Sibert commanded a Battalion of Engineers assigned to the Department of the Pacific from September 1899 to March 1900 and a Battalion of Engineers assigned to the 8th Army Corps from September 1899 to April 1900.

Sibert returned to the United States in April 1900 and was assigned to command the Louisville River and Harbor District. In December 1901, he left Kentucky to assume command of the Pittsburgh River and Harbor District, where he served until March 1907. Sibert was promoted to major in April 1904. From March 1907 to May 1914, Sibert was a member of the Panama Canal Commission and commander of the canal's Atlantic division, and was responsible for the building of a number of critical parts of the Panama Canal, including the Gatun Locks and Dam, the West Breakwater in Colon, and the channel from Gatun Lake to the Pacific Ocean. He was promoted to lieutenant colonel in September 1909.

From June 1914 to March 1915, Sibert was chairman of a board of engineers that considered plans for implementing flood prevention projects on the Huai River in China. In March 1915, Sibert was promoted to brigadier general as a commendation for his service during the construction of the Panama Canal, and also received the Thanks of Congress. He was then assigned to command the Pacific Coast Artillery District, which he led until May 1917.

== Later career ==
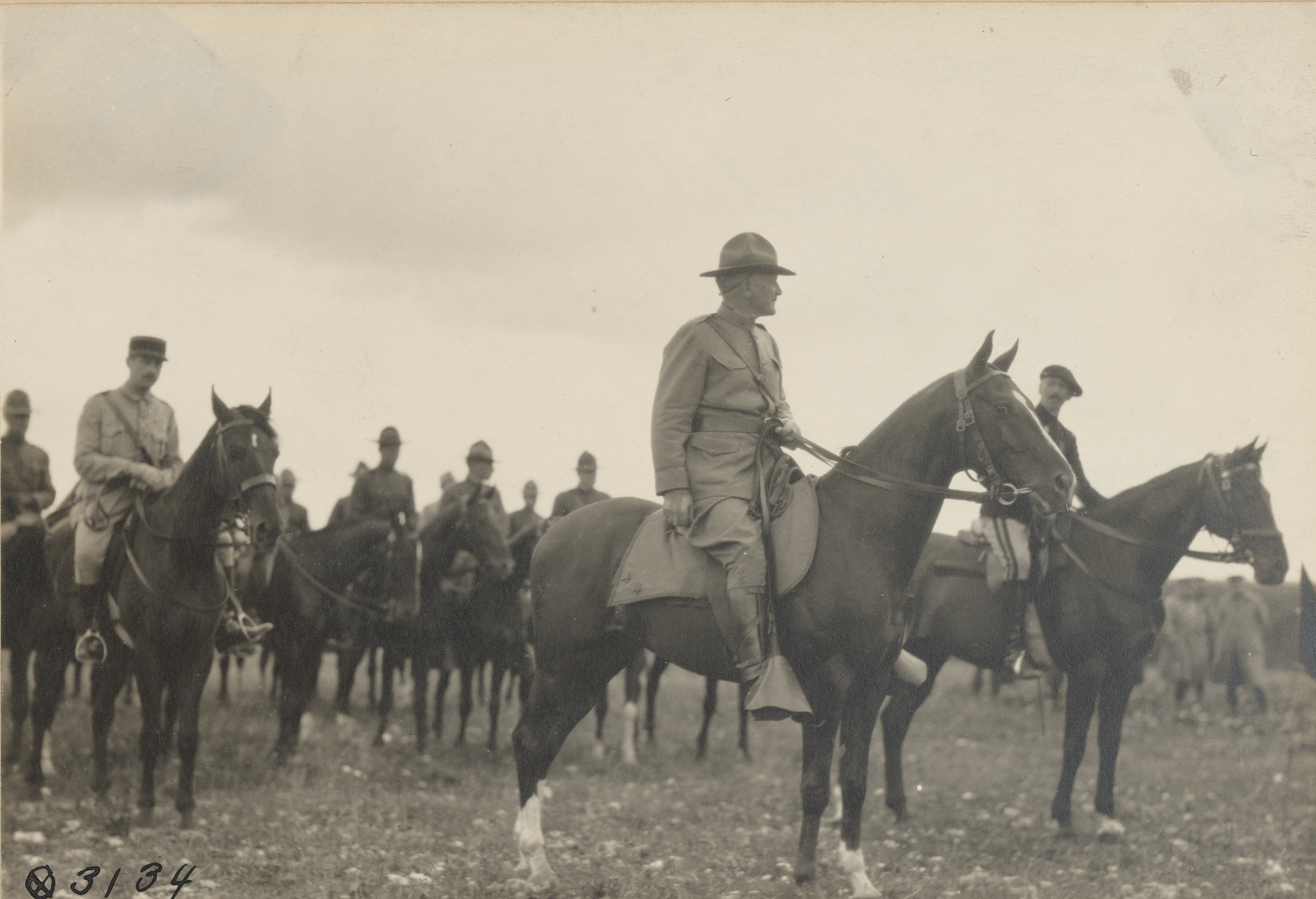
Sibert and a French general reviewing American troops in France, 1917.

When the United States entered World War I in April 1917, Sibert was promoted to temporary major general and assigned to command the 1st Division. He led the unit during its initial organization and training, and was in command when the division arrived in France, where it underwent additional training by experienced French and British forces.

In late 1917, General John J. Pershing, commander-in-chief of the American Expeditionary Forces in France, inspected the 1st Division. Unimpressed by what he observed, Pershing began to berate Sibert in front of his staff, including the assistant chief of staff for operations, George C. Marshall. Sibert took Pershing's criticism in silence, but when Pershing turned his attention to the division chief of staff, Marshall angrily interceded to inform Pershing of logistical and administrative difficulties of which Pershing was unaware. Marshall also informed Pershing that the AEF staff had not been very helpful in dealing with the problems. Sibert and his staff were concerned that Marshall's willingness to confront Pershing had probably cost him his career. Instead, Pershing began to seek out Marshall and ask for his advice whenever he visited the 1st Division. In January 1918, the 1st Division prepared to deploy into the line at Ansauville, and Sibert was succeeded by Major General Robert Lee Bullard, who had led an infantry brigade of the division months before.

Sibert returned to the United States in December 1917 and was appointed to command the Southeastern Engineer Department, which was headquartered in Charleston, South Carolina. When the War Department created the Chemical Warfare Service (CWS) in early 1918, Pershing suggested Sibert to command it, and his recommendation was approved. Sibert led the CWS from May 1918 to March 1920, during which the newly-organized unit focused on production of equipment and chemical agents, including Lewisite, and the development of the U.S. Army's chemical defense equipment, including the first U.S. protective masks (or "gas masks"), the M-1 and M-2. When Sibert announced his retirement in 1919, Brigadier General Amos Fries, commanding the CWS in France, was selected to replace him.

Sibert was awarded the Army Distinguished Service Medal for his World War I service, the citation for which reads:

The President of the United States of America, authorized by Act of Congress, July 9, 1918, takes pleasure in presenting the Army Distinguished Service Medal to Major General William Luther Sibert, United States Army, for exceptionally meritorious and distinguished services to the Government of the United States, in a duty of great responsibility during World War I, in the organization and administration of the Chemical Warfare Service, contributory to the successful prosecution of the war. Service: United States Army Rank: Major General Division: Chemical Warfare Service Action Date: World War I Orders: War Department, General Orders No. 18 (1919)

Sibert commanded the 5th Division and Camp Gordon, Georgia from March to April 1920, when he retired, after which he settled in Bowling Green, Kentucky. In 1923, he became manager of the Alabama State Docks Commission, where he carried out the modernization of the docks and waterways in Mobile, Alabama. From 1928 to 1933, he served on the presidential commission that developed plans for construction of the Hoover Dam. From 1929 to 1920, he served as president of the American Association of Port Authorities.

== Retirement and death ==
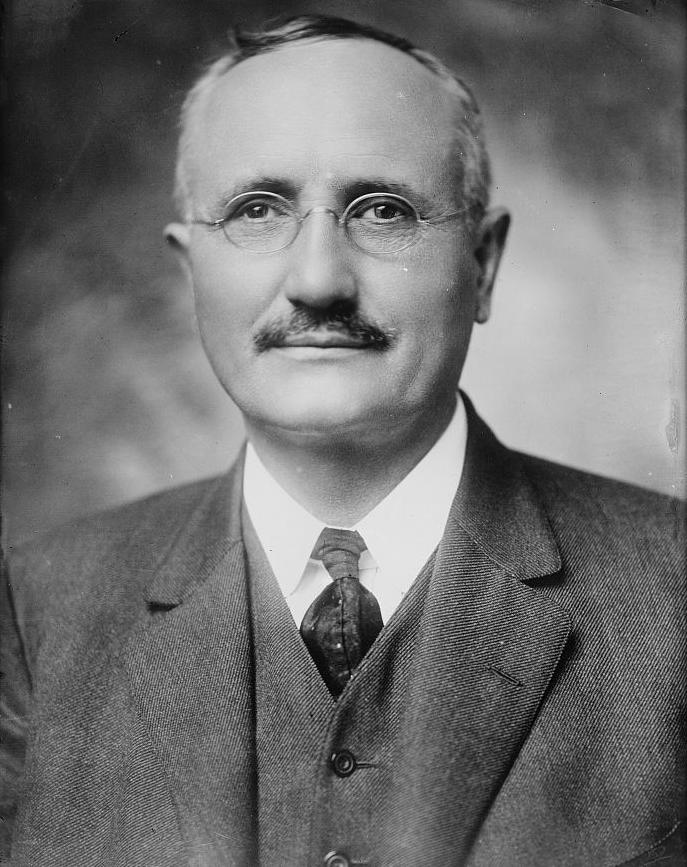
Siebert in retirement, 1920 or later

In retirement, Sibert returned to Bowling Green. He was a longtime member of the American Society of Civil Engineers, and in 1919 he received the honorary degrees of LL.D. from the University of Alabama and D.E. from the University of Nebraska–Lincoln. Sibert died in Bowling Green on October 16, 1935. He was buried at Arlington National Cemetery.

As the first commander of the Chemical Warfare Service, Sibert is regarded as the army's "father of the Chemical Corps." In 1942, the Army established its first chemical warfare center training in Alabama, which was named for Sibert. Camp Sibert was active until the end of World War II, and was deactivated in 1945. A Second World War camp near Boulder City, Nevada was also named in Sibert's honor, but the name was later changed to Camp Williston. In 1961, Sibert was inducted into the Alabama Hall of Fame and the Alabama Engineering Hall of Fame. Since 1988, the Chemical Corps has presented the annual Major General William L. Sibert Award to the chemical company judged the best in any component of the army. In 1989, Sibert was inducted into the Chemical Corps Hall of Fame.

== Family ==
Sibert married Mary Margaret Cummings in September 1887. They were the parents of seven sons and one daughter; two sons died in infancy. After Mary's 1915 death, in 1917, Sibert married Juliette Roberts. She died 15 months later, and in 1922 Sibert married Evelyn Clyne Bairnsfather. Two of Sibert's sons, Edwin L. Sibert and Franklin C. Sibert, were career army officers who attained the rank of major general.

== Decorations ==
Army Distinguished Service Medal
Spanish Campaign Medal
Philippine Campaign Medal
World War I Victory Medal with four Battle Clasps
Commandeur of the Legion of Honor

== Dates of rank ==
Sibert's dates of rank were:

- Second Lieutenant, 15 June 1884
- First Lieutenant, 7 April 1888
- Captain, 31 March 1896
- Major, 23 April 1904
- Lieutenant Colonel, 21 September 1909
- Brigadier General, 4 March 1915
- Major General, 15 May 1917
- Major General (retired), 3 April 1920

== Works by ==
- Sibert, William L.; Stevens, John F. (1915). The Construction of the Panama Canal. New York: D. Appleton and Company – via Google Books.

Military offices
Preceded by Newly activated organization	Commanding General 1st Division; 27 June 1917 – 13 December 1917	Succeeded by Robert Lee Bullard
Preceded by Newly activated organization	Commanding General Chemical Warfare Service; 17 May 1918 – 1 March 1920	Succeeded by Amos Fries
Preceded by Wilds P. Richardson	Commanding General 5th Division; 1 March 1920 – 3 March 1920	Succeeded by David C. Shanks
