= 87th Infantry Division (United States) =

87th Training Division 87th Infantry Division
- 87th Infantry Division shoulder sleeve insignia
- Active: 5 August 1917–14 February 1919 (National Army); 24 June 1921–21 September 1945 (Organized Reserve); 6 November 1946–15 February 1957 (Army Reserve); 15 February 1957–1 October 1993 (87th Maneuver Area Cmd.); 1 October 1993–4 November 2008 (87th Training Div.); 4 November 2008– (87th USAR Supt. Cmd.); 12 April 2021–present (87th Training Div.)
- Country: United States
- Branch: United States Army Reserve
- Type: Training
- Size: Division
- Part of: 84th Training Command
- Nickname: "Golden Acorn" (special designation)
- Mottos: Stalwart and Strong
- Engagements: World War I; World War II; Rhineland; Ardennes-Alsace; Central Europe

Commanders
- Current commander: BG Sonya A. Powell
- Notable commanders: Frank L. Culin Jr. Percy W. Clarkson

Insignia
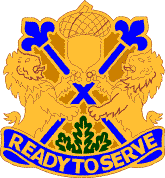
- Distinctive unit insignia

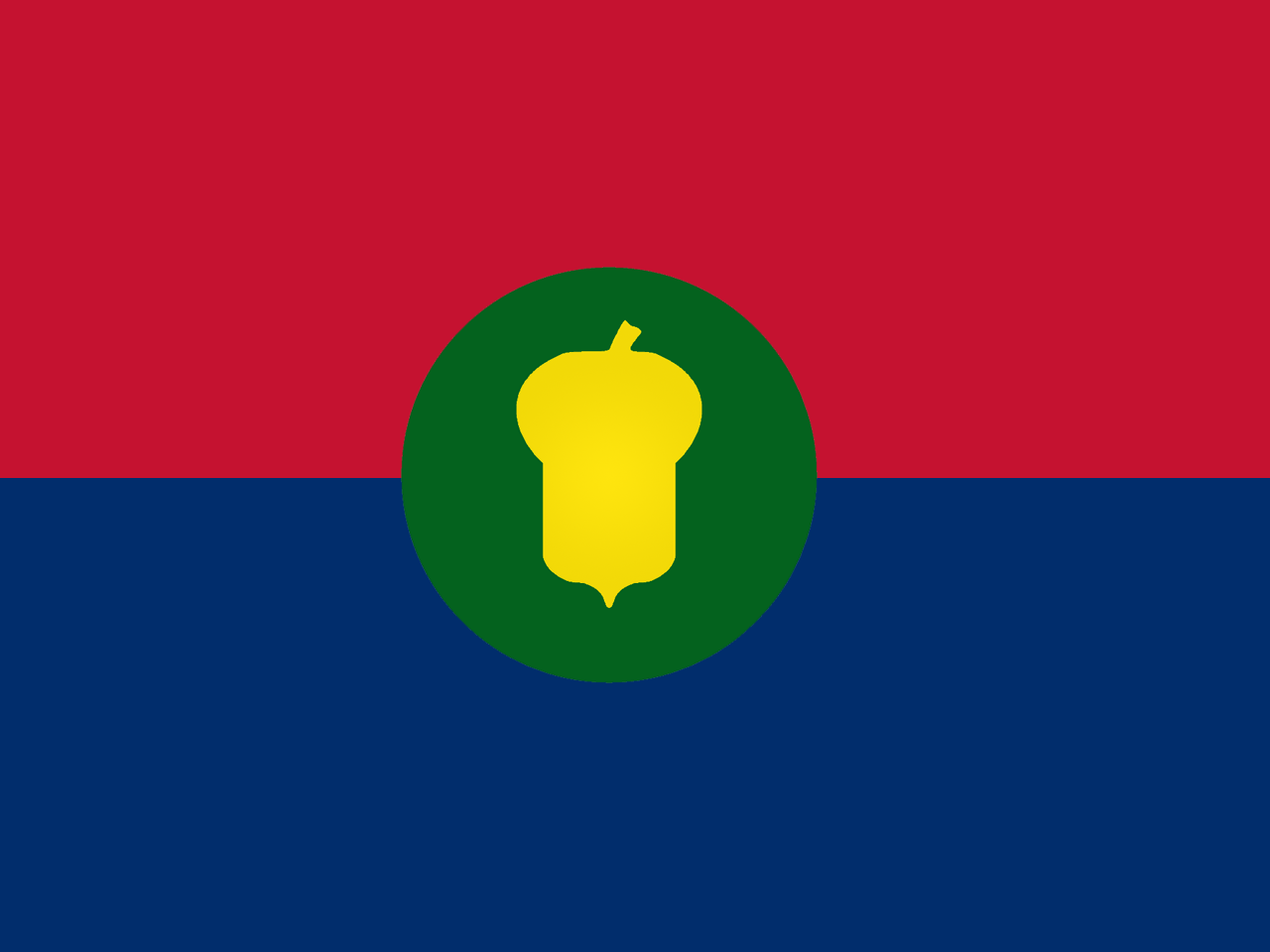
- Flag of the United States Army 87th Training Division

The 87th Infantry Division ("Golden Acorn") was a unit of the United States Army in World War I and World War II. After World War II, the 87th Cavalry Reconnaissance Troop became the 173rd Airborne Brigade Combat Team, which made the only combat jump in Vietnam and in Iraq. As of 22 September 2021, the rest of the division now exists as a training formation as part of the 84th Training Command as the 87th Training Division.

== History ==
=== World War I ===
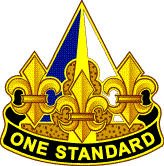
2nd Brigade, 87th Division distinctive insignia

The 87th Division was a National Army division, organized as a square division and made up of draftees from Alabama, Arkansas, Louisiana and Mississippi. It was activated at Camp Pike, Arkansas, on 25 August 1917, nearly five months after the American entry into World War I.

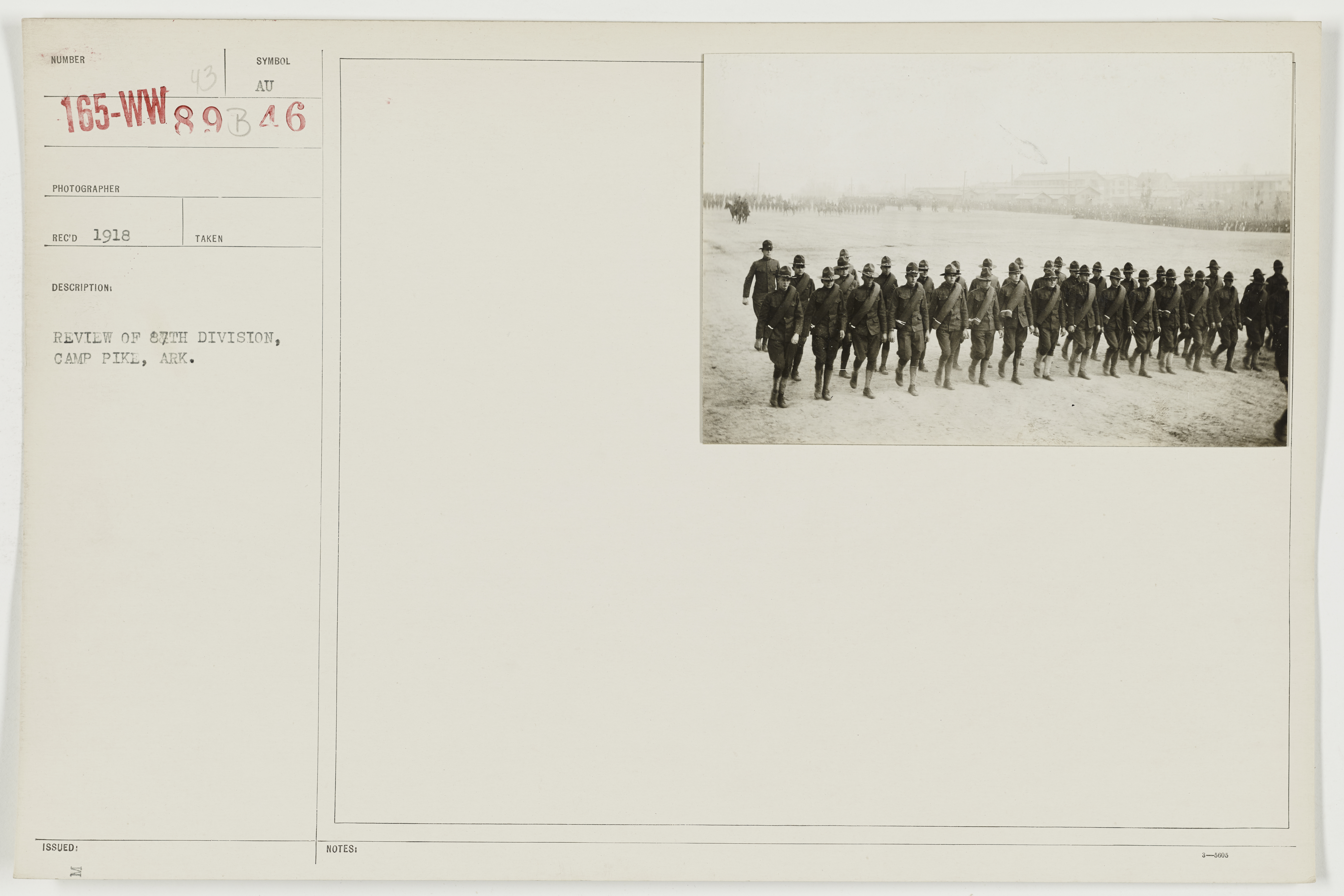
Review of the 87th Division, Camp Pike, Arkansas.

Like many units, the 87th Division was used to furnish personnel for other units scheduled for earlier overseas departure. Before November, most of the enlisted men were transferred to other units (2,400 to the 81st Division, 3,000 to the 31st Division, and 8,000 to the 39th Division).

The division was reconstituted from draftees drawn from the Midwest. Between January and June 1918, 40,000 men arrived at Camp Pike, but 30,000 left. The 87th Division lost more than 20,000 men, and numbered just 15,000 men in June 1918.

It was again reconstituted, with draftees mostly from New Jersey, New York, and Pennsylvania. It went overseas to the Western Front in September 1918, but was utilized as a pool of laborers by the Services of Supply (SOS) of the American Expeditionary Forces (AEF).

It returned to the United States in January 1919, shortly after the Armistice with Germany in November, to Camp Dix, New Jersey, and was demobilized in February 1919.

==== Order of battle ====
- Headquarters, 87th Division
- 173rd Infantry Brigade
  - 345th Infantry Regiment
  - 346th Infantry Regiment
  - 335th Machine Gun Battalion
- 174th Infantry Brigade
  - 347th Infantry Regiment
  - 348th Infantry Regiment
  - 336th Machine Gun Battalion
- 162nd Field Artillery Brigade
  - 334th Field Artillery Regiment (75 mm)
  - 335th Field Artillery Regiment (75 mm)
  - 336th Field Artillery Regiment (155 mm)
  - 312th Trench Mortar Battery
- 334th Machine Gun Battalion
- 312th Engineer Regiment
- 312th Medical Regiment
- 312th Field Signal Battalion
- Headquarters Troop, 87th Division
- 312th Train Headquarters and Military Police
  - 312th Ammunition Train
  - 312th Supply Train
  - 312th Engineer Train
  - 312th Sanitary Train
    - 345th, 346th, 347th, and 348th Ambulance Companies and Field Hospitals

==== WWI Commanders ====
1. Major General Samuel D. Sturgis (25 August 1917).
2. Brigadier General Robert Campbell Van Vliet (13 November 1917).
3. Major General Samuel D. Sturgis.
4. Colonel John O'Shea (6 October 1918).
5. Major General Samuel D. Sturgis (23 October 1918).
6. Brigadier General W. F. Martin (22 November 1918).

=== Interwar period ===
The 87th Division was reconstituted in the Organized Reserve on 24 June 1921, allotted to the Fourth Corps Area, and assigned to the XIV Corps. The division was further allotted to the states of Louisiana, Alabama, and Mississippi. The division headquarters was organized on 23 September 1921 in Jackson, Mississippi. The headquarters was subsequently relocated on 14 October 1921 to the New Orleans International Depot in New Orleans, Louisiana, and once again relocated in April 1922 to Poland and Dauphine Streets in New Orleans, where it remained until activated for World War II. To maintain communications with the officers of the division, the chief of staff published a division newsletter named "The Acorn" in keeping with division’s nickname and the military, geographical, and historical background of the regions from which it drew its personnel. The newsletter informed the division’s members of such things as when and where the inactive training sessions were to be held, what the division’s summer training quotas were, where the camps were to be held, and which units would be assigned to help conduct the Citizens Military Training Camps (CMTC).

The designated mobilization and training station for the 87th Division was Camp McClellan, Alabama, the location where much of the division’s training activities occurred in the interwar years. The division headquarters was called to duty for training there as a unit on a number of occasions. The headquarters and special staff usually trained with their counterparts on the staff of the 8th Infantry Brigade, 4th Division, either at Camp McClellan or at Fort McPherson, Georgia. The infantry regiments of the division held their summer training primarily with the 4th Division's 8th or 22nd Infantry Regiments, either at Camp McClellan or at one of the Regular Army regiments' home stations. Other units, such as the special troops, artillery, engineers, aviation, medical, and quartermaster, trained at various posts in the Fourth Corps Area, usually with the active units of the 4th Division. For example, the division’s artillery trained with units of the 2nd Battalion, 16th Field Artillery at Fort Bragg, North Carolina; the 312th Engineer Regiment trained at Fort Benning, Georgia, with the 4th and 7th Engineer Regiments; the 312th Medical Regiment trained at Fort Oglethorpe, Georgia; and the 312th Observation Squadron trained with the 22nd Observation Squadron at Maxwell Field, Alabama.

In addition to the unit training camps, the infantry regiments of the division rotated responsibility to conduct the CMTC held at Camp McClellan and Fort McPherson each year. On a number of occasions, the division participated in Fourth Corps Area and Third Army command post exercises in conjunction with other Regular Army, National Guard, and Organized Reserve units. Unlike the Regular and Guard units in the Fourth Corps Area, the 87th Division did not participate in the various Fourth Corps Area maneuvers and the Third Army maneuvers of 1938, 1940, and 1941 as an organized unit due to lack of enlisted personnel and equipment. Instead, the officers and a few enlisted reservists were assigned to Regular and Guard units to fill vacant slots and bring the units up to war strength for the exercises. Additionally, some officers were assigned duties as umpires or support personnel. For the 1938 Third Army maneuvers, for example, about 200 of the division’s officers were attached to the National Guard's 31st Division (troops from Alabama, Florida, Louisiana, and Mississippi) to allow that unit to function as an almost full-strength division.

=== World War II ===
==== Mobilization ====
Before Organized Reserve infantry divisions were ordered into active military service, they were reorganized on paper as "triangular" divisions under the 1940 tables of organization. The headquarters companies of the two infantry brigades were consolidated into the division's cavalry reconnaissance troop, and one infantry regiment was removed by inactivation. The field artillery brigade headquarters and headquarters battery became the headquarters and headquarters battery of the division artillery, and its three field artillery regiments were reorganized into four battalions. The engineer, medical, and quartermaster regiments were reorganized into battalions. In 1942, divisional quartermaster battalions were split into ordnance light maintenance companies and quartermaster companies, and the division's headquarters and military police company, which had previously been a combined unit, was split.

The 87th Infantry Division was ordered into active military service on 15 December 1942 at Camp McCain, Mississippi. It was nicknamed the "Baby Division" because many of its initial filler soldiers were among the first eighteen year olds conscripted after the lower limit of the draft age was reduced from twenty to eighteen years old in November 1942. It moved to the Tennessee Maneuver Area on 3 December 1943, for the Second Army #4 Tennessee Maneuvers, and consolidated at Fort Jackson, South Carolina on 20 January 1944 for divisional training. The division staged at Camp Kilmer, at Stelton (now Edison), New Jersey, on 10 October 1944 until it received its port call to the New York Port of Embarkation in Brooklyn, New York.

==== Division organization ====
The division consisted of the following units:

87th Infantry Division organization (click to enlarge)

- 87th Infantry Division
  - 87th Infantry Division Headquarters
  - 87th Cavalry Reconnaissance Troop (Mechanized) (M3 scout cars and then M8 Greyhound armored cars)
  - 345th Infantry Regiment
    - Headquarters and Headquarters Company
    - 3× Infantry battalions
      - each battalion consists of: 1× Headquarters and Headquarters Company, 3× Rifle companies, 1× Heavy Weapons Company
    - Cannon Company (T12 Gun Motor Carriages and T19 Howitzer Motor Carriages, later replaced by either M3 105mm towed howitzers or M7 Priest self propelled howitzers)
    - Anti-Tank Company (M3 37mm anti-tank guns, which were replaced by 1944 with M1 57mm anti-tank guns)
    - Service Company
  - 346th Infantry Regiment
    - same organization as 345th Infantry Regiment
  - 347th Infantry Regiment
    - same organization as 345th Infantry Regiment
  - 87th Infantry Division Artillery
    - Headquarters and Headquarters Battery
    - 334th Field Artillery Battalion
      - Headquarters and Headquarters Battery
      - 3× Batteries (M2 105mm towed howitzers)
      - Service Battery
    - 335th Field Artillery Battalion
      - Headquarters and Headquarters Battery
      - 3× Batteries (M1 155mm towed howitzers)
      - Service Battery
    - 336th Field Artillery Battalion
      - same organization as 334th Field Artillery Battalion
    - 912th Field Artillery Battalion
      - same organization as 334th Field Artillery Battalion
  - Headquarters Special Troops
    - Headquarters Company, 87th Infantry Division
    - 87th Signal Company
    - 87th Quartermaster Company
    - 787th Ordnance Light Maintenance Company
    - Military Police Platoon
    - 87th Infantry Division Band (attached)
  - 312th Engineer Combat Battalion
    - Headquarters and Headquarters and Service Company
    - 3× Engineer combat companies
  - 312th Medical Battalion
    - Headquarters and Headquarters Detachment
    - 3× Collecting companies
    - Clearing Company

==== Combat chronicle ====
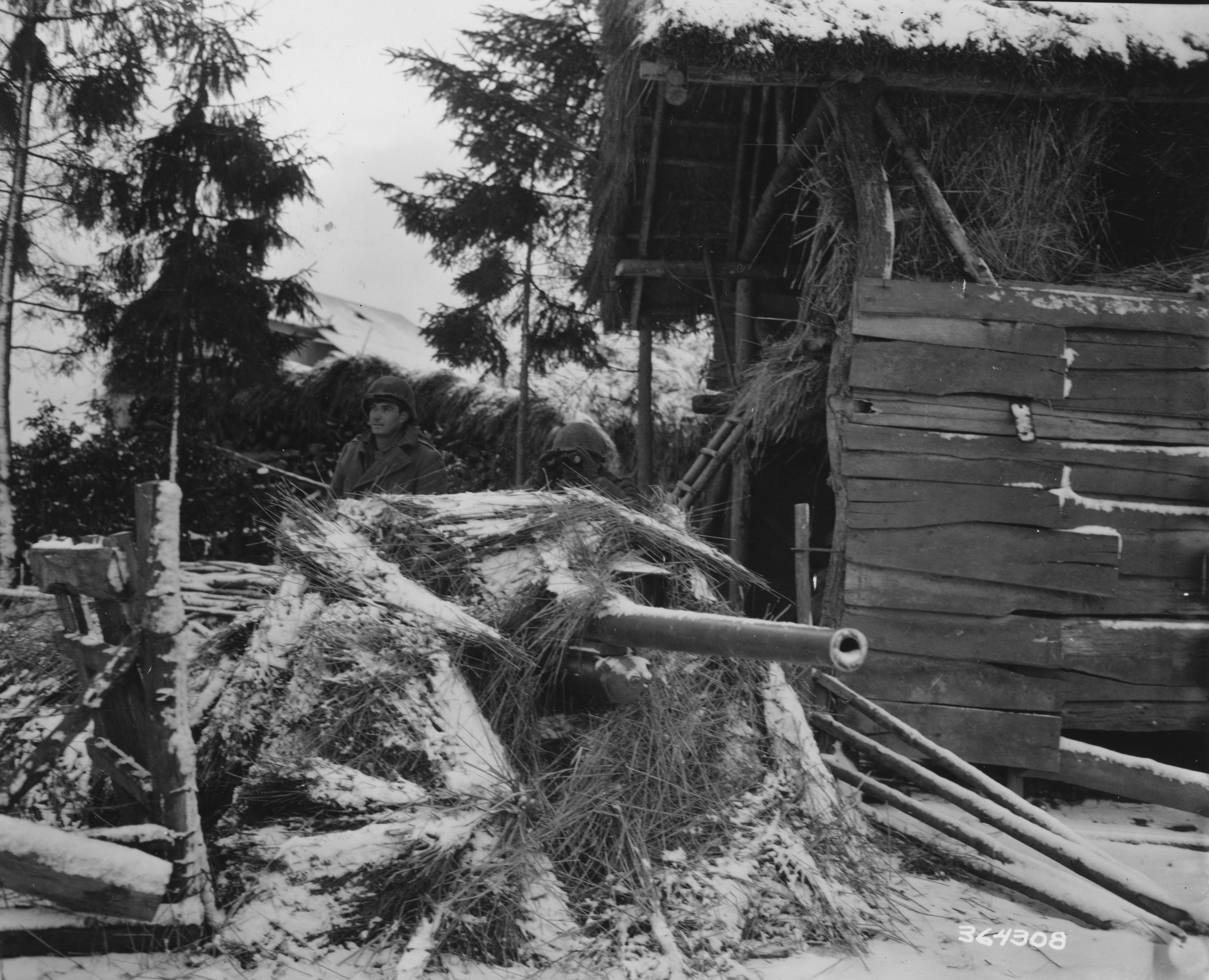
G.I.'s of the 1st Battalion, 345th Infantry Regiment, 87th Infantry Division, shown on duty at a gun position near Moircy, Belgium, December 31, 1944.

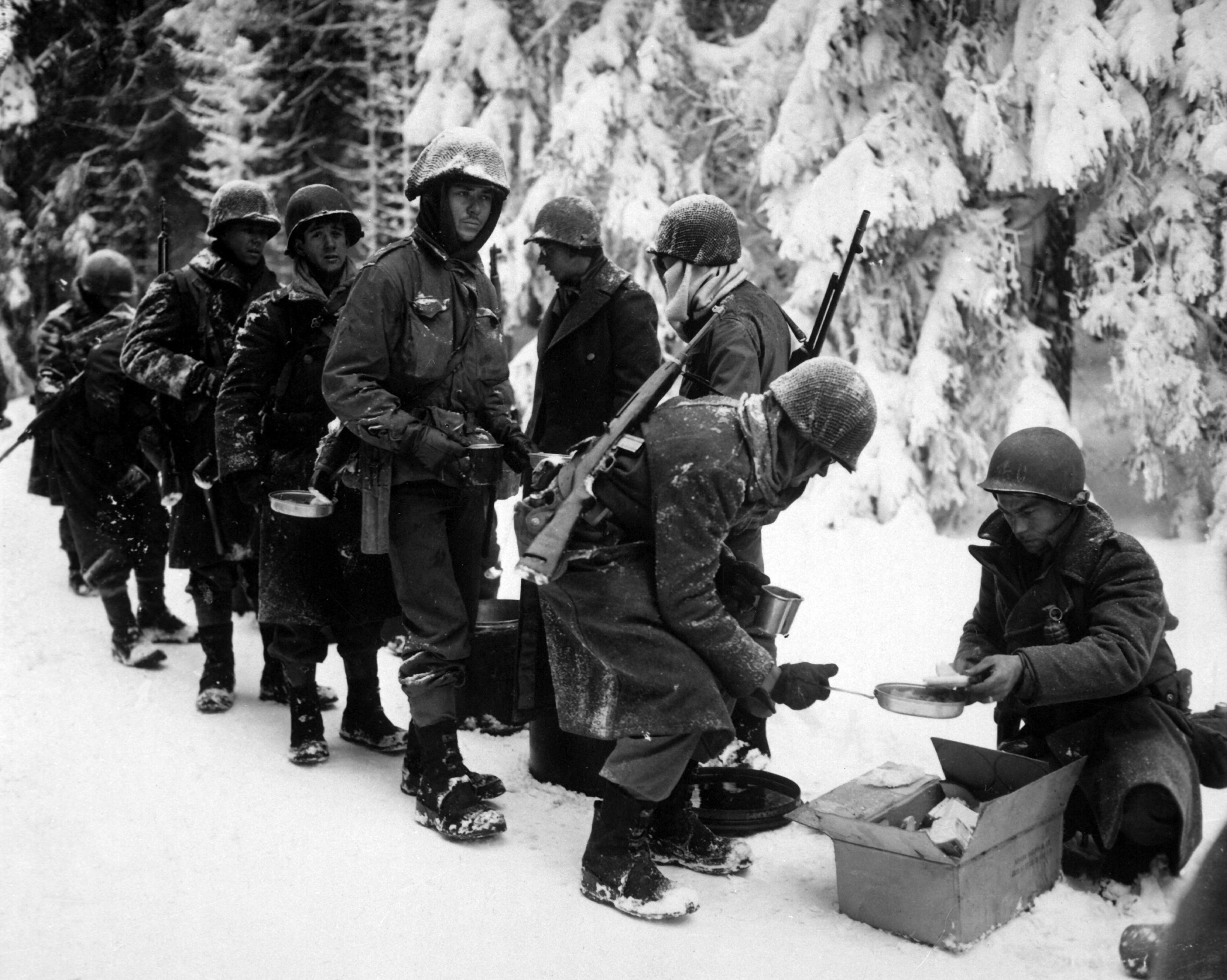
Chow is served to American infantrymen of the 347th Infantry Regiment on their way to La Roche, Belgium, 13 January 1945.

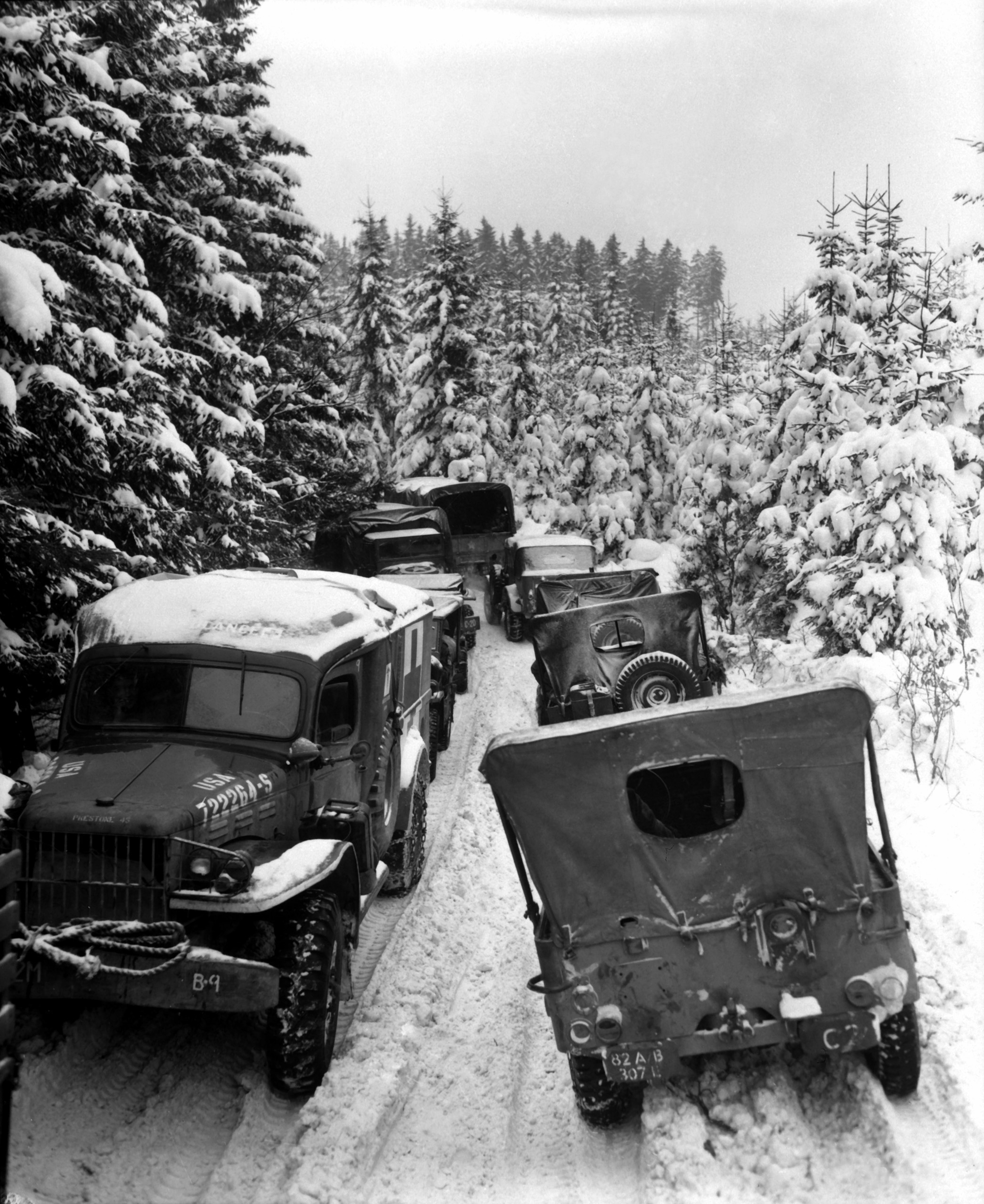
Vehicles of the 87th Infantry Division in the woods near Wallerode/St. Vith, Belgium, on 30 January 1945.

The 87th Infantry Division arrived in Scotland, 22 October 1944, and trained in England, 23 October-30 November. It landed in France, including at Rouen, 1–3 December, and moved to Metz, where, on 6 December, it went into action against and took Fort Driant after shelling the ports day and night for five days. The division then shifted to the vicinity of Gros-Réderching near the Saar-German border on 10 December. The 87th was moving into Germany when, on 16 December 1944, German Field Marshal Von Rundstedt launched his offensive in the Ardennes forest (Battle of the Bulge). Through 22 December, the division captured Rimling, Obergailbach, and Guiderkirch. Then ordered to head for the Bulge, they were relieved by the 44th division.

The Division was placed in SHAEF (Supreme Headquarters Allied Expeditionary Force) reserve, 24–28 December, then thrown into the Bulge battle in Belgium, 29 December. In a fluctuating battle, it captured Moircy on 29 December and Recogne on 30 December. On 2 January 1945, it took Gérimont, on 10 January Tillet, 12 January St. Hubert, and reached the Ourthe by 13 January. On 15 January 1945, the division moved to Luxembourg to relieve the 4th Infantry Division along the Sauer and seized Wasserbillig on 23 January. The 87th moved to the vicinity of St. Vith, 28 January, and attacked and captured Schlierbach, Selz, and Hogden by the end of the month. After the fall of Neuendorf, 9 February, the division went on the defensive until 26 February, when Ormont and Hallschlag were taken in night attacks. The 87th crossed the Kyll River, 6 March, took Dollendorf on 8 March, and after a brief rest, returned to combat, 13 March 1945, crossing the Moselle on 16th and clearing Koblenz, 18–19 March. The division crossed the Rhine, 25–26 March, despite strong opposition, consolidated its bridgehead, and secured Grossenlinden and Langgöns. On 7 April, it jumped off in an attack which carried it through Thuringia into Saxony. Plauen fell, 17 April, and the division took up defensive positions, 20 April, about 4 miles from the border to Czechoslovakia. On 6 May 1945, it took Falkenstein. On 10 May 1945, the division was ordered to maintain the immediate area, moving back through Poessneck to Saalfeld, where they took over two hotels, one of which was called the Hotel Goldener Anker. Troops maintained their positions until Victory in Europe Day, and remained in these hotels until at least 16 May 1945.

The 87th Division returned to the States in July 1945 expecting to be called upon to play a role in the defeat of the Imperial Japanese, but the sudden termination of the war in the Pacific while the division was reassembling at Fort Benning changed the future of the 87th. The division was inactivated 21 September 1945.

The last active soldier from the division that served in World War II retired in June 1981. Colonel Vedder B. Driscoll (1925–1983), who had enlisted in 1943 and was a platoon sergeant for Company I, 345th Infantry, achieved thirty years of commissioned service.

==== Casualties ====
- Total battle casualties: 6,034
- Killed in action: 1,154
- Wounded in action: 4,342
- Missing in action: 109
- Prisoner of war: 429

==== Assignments in ETO ====
- 25 November 1944: Third Army, 12th Army Group.
- 4 December 1944: III Corps.
- 11 December 1944: XII Corps.
- 21 December 1944: XV Corps, Seventh Army, 6th Army Group.
- 29 December 1944: VIII Corps, Third Army, 12th Army Group.
- 14 January 1945: XII Corps.
- 25 January 1945: VIII Corps.
- 22 April 1945: VIII Corps, First Army, 12th Army Group.

==== Commanders ====
1. MG Percy W. Clarkson (December 1942 – October 1943),
2. MG Eugene M. Landrum (October 1943 – April 1944),
3. MG Frank L. Culin Jr. (April 1944 to inactivation).

==== Division statistics ====
- Campaigns: Rhineland, Ardennes-Alsace, Central Europe.
- Days of combat: 154.
- Distinguished Unit Citation: 2.
- Returned to U.S.: 11 July 1945.
- Inactivated: 20 September 1945.

==== Individual decorations ====
1. Medal of Honor-1;
2. Distinguished Service Cross-9;
3. Army Distinguished Service Medal-1;
4. Silver Star-364;
5. Legion of Merit −20;
6. Soldier's Medal −41;
7. Bronze Star −1,542;
8. Air Medal −49.

=== Postwar ===
The 87th Infantry Division was reformed in the Organized Reserve Corps after the war, in the Third Army area. It comprised units in Alabama, Tennessee, Mississippi, and Florida. It was inactivated on 15 February 1957 in Birmingham, Alabama, and subsequently the division shoulder sleeve insignia and number, but not the division lineage and honors, were used by the 87th Maneuver Area Command (MAC), also in Birmingham, with sixteen subordinate battalions. The 87th MAC was later inactivated and, on 1 October 1993, the lineage of the 87th Infantry Division was redesignated as Headquarters, 87th Division (Exercise) and activated at Birmingham, Alabama. On 17 October 1999 it was reorganized and redesignated Headquarters, 87th Division (Training Support).

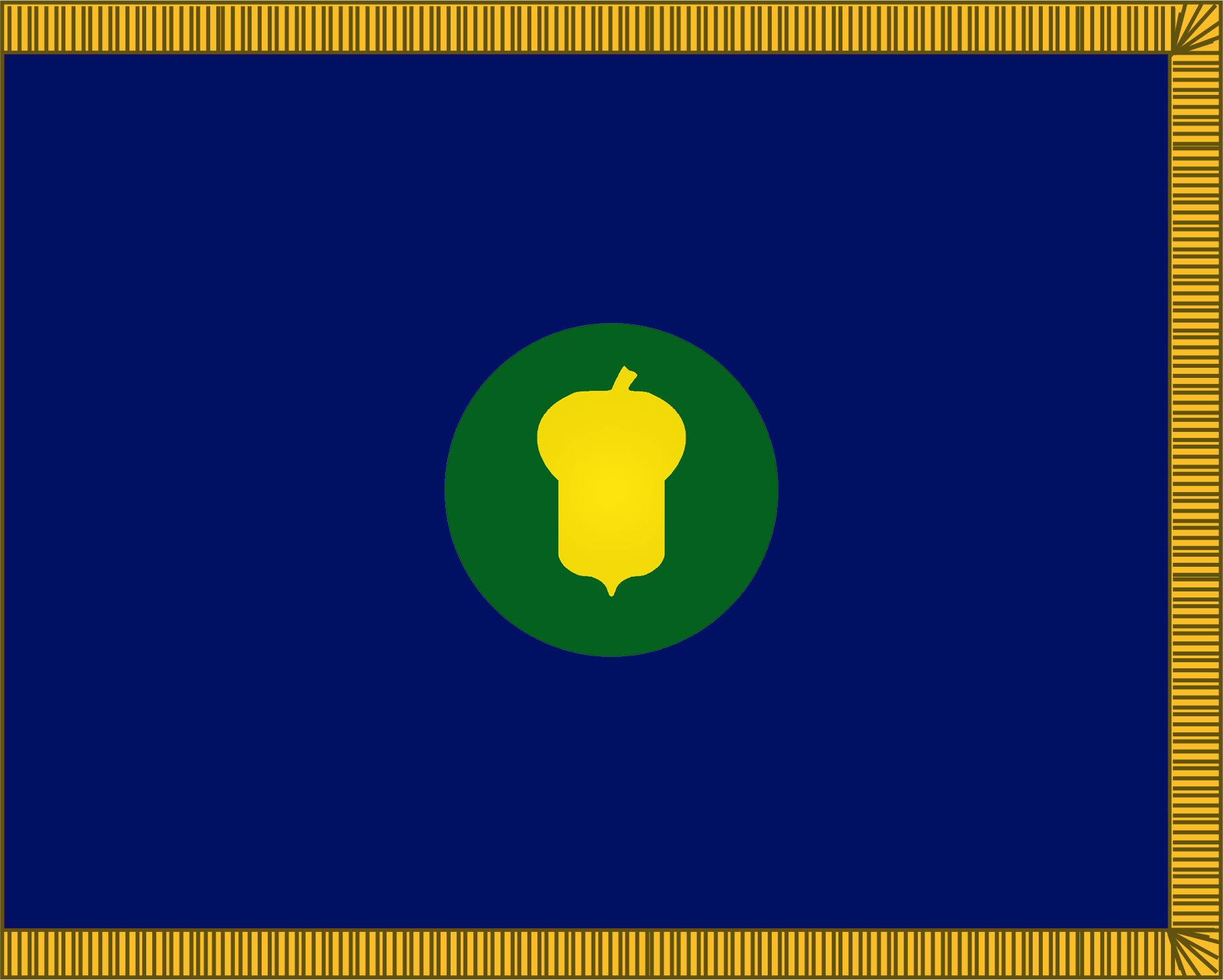
87th Army Reserve Support Command Flag

First Army Division East was activated on 7 March 2007, and was headquartered at Fort George G. Meade, Maryland. "..Division East replaced the functions previously performed by US Army Reserve divisions, like the 87th Division, in its area of responsibility. As a result, the 87th Division's brigades were subsequently inactivated and the 87th Division was reorganized and redesignated as the 87th Army Reserve Support Command. The 87th Army Reserve Support Command assumed command and control of the newly formed Mobilization Support Group East and its 16 subordinate battalions effective 16 October 2008."

On 1 October 2015 the 87th Army Reserve Support Command was inactivated.

On 22 September 2021. The 87th Training Division was reactivated in Hoover, Alabama under the 84th Training Command.

== Units in 2026 ==
The 87th Training Division is a subordinate formation of the 84th Training Command. As of January 2026 the division consists of the following units:

- 87th Training Division, in Birmingham (AL)
  - Mission Training Complex (MTC), in Houston (TX)
  - 1st Brigade, at Fort Gillem (GA)
    - 1st Mission Command Training Detachment (MCTD), in Houston (TX)
    - 2nd Mission Command Training Detachment (MCTD), in Birmingham (AL)
    - 4th Battalion, 345th Regiment (Observe/Controller Trainer — OC/T), at Camp Bullis (TX)
    - 3rd Battalion, 346th Regiment (Observe/Controller Trainer — OC/T), in Laurel (MS)
  - 2nd Brigade, at Fort Jackson (SC)
    - 1st Mission Command Training Detachment (MCTD), at Fort Jackson (SC)
      - 1st Branch, 1st MCTD, in Nashville (TN)
    - 2nd Mission Command Training Detachment (MCTD), at Fort Benning (GA)
      - 1st Branch, 2nd MCTD, in West Palm Beach (FL)
    - 4th Battalion, 347th Regiment (Observe/Controller Trainer — OC/T), in Orlando (FL)
    - 1st Battalion, 348th Regiment (Observe/Controller Trainer — OC/T), at Fort Gillem (GA)

== Decorations ==
Ribbon	Award	Year	Orders
	Army Superior Unit Award	2008–2011	Permanent Orders 332-07 announcing award of the Army Superior Unit award
