= Petit-Réderching =

- Commune
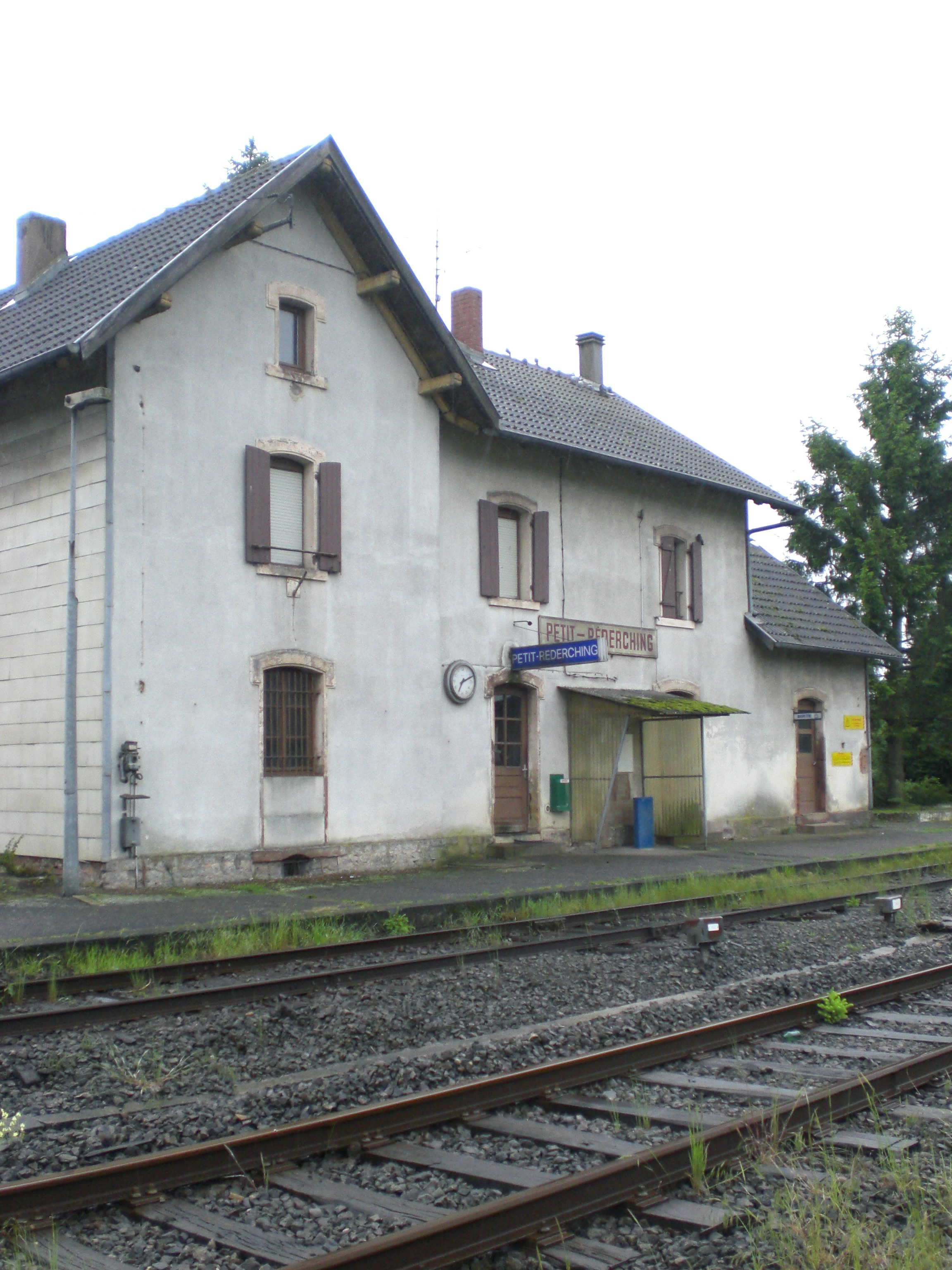
- The old railway station in Petit-Rederching

- Coat of arms
- Location of Petit-Réderching
- Location within France Location within Grand Est
- Coordinates: 49°03′17″N 7°18′18″E
- Country: France
- Region: Grand Est
- Department: Moselle
- Arrondissement: Sarreguemines
- Canton: Bitche
- Intercommunality: CC du Pays de Bitche

Government
  - Mayor (2020–2026): Florence Zins
- Area^{1}: 11 km^{2} (4.2 sq mi)
- Highest elevation: 362 m (1,188 ft)
- Lowest elevation: 258 m (846 ft)
- Population (2023): 1,417
  - Density: 130/km^{2} (330/sq mi)
- Time zone: UTC+01:00 (CET)
  - Summer (DST): UTC+02:00 (CEST)
- INSEE/Postal code: 57535 /57410
- ^{1} French Land Register data, which excludes lakes, ponds, glaciers > 1 km^{2} (0.386 sq mi or 247 acres) and river estuaries.

Petit-Réderching (French pronunciation: [pəti ʁedɛʁʃɛ̃]; German: Kleinrederchingen; Lorraine Franconian: Kläänrederschinge) is a commune in the Moselle department of the Grand Est administrative region in north-eastern France. The village belongs to the Pays de Bitche. The similarly named commune Gros-Réderching lies 6 km to the west.

== See also ==
- Communes of the Moselle department
