= Percy W. Clarkson =

United States Army general (1893–1962)

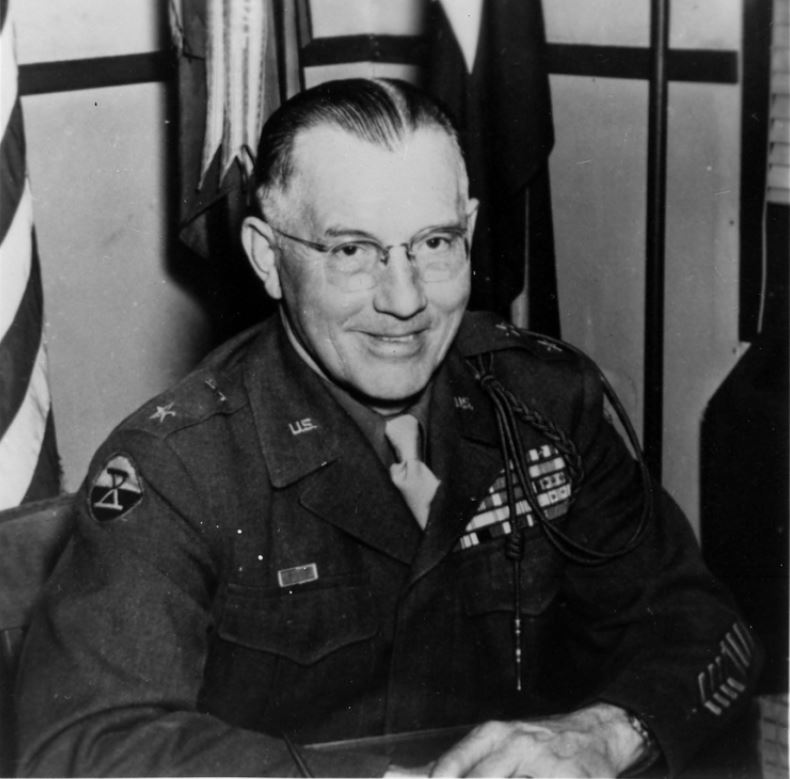
- Clarkson as 3rd Infantry Division commander c. 1950
- Born: December 9, 1893; San Antonio, Texas, United States
- Died: September 14, 1962 (aged 68); Fort Sam Houston, Texas, United States
- Burial place: San Francisco National Cemetery, California, United States
- Relatives: BG Herbert S. Clarkson (brother); LTG Withers A. Burress (brother-in-law)
- Military career
- Allegiance: United States
- Branch: United States Army
- Service years: 1916–1954
- Rank: Major General
- Service number: 0-4676
- Unit: Infantry Branch
- Commands: 3rd Infantry Division; X Corps; 33rd Infantry Division; 87th Infantry Division
- Conflicts: World War I; Aisne-Marne Offensive; Meuse–Argonne offensive; World War II; New Guinea campaign; Battle of Morotai; Philippines campaign; Battle of Luzon; Battle of Baguio
- Awards: Distinguished Service Medal (3); Silver Star (2); Legion of Merit; Bronze Star Medal; Army Commendation Medal; Air Medal; Purple Heart
- Other work: Chairman, National Bank of Fort Sam Houston

Percy William Clarkson (December 9, 1893 – September 14, 1962) was a highly decorated officer in United States Army with the rank of major general. He is most noted as commander of the 33rd Infantry Division from 1943 to 1945 during its World War II involvement in the United States armed forces' reconquest of the Philippines.

Following the war, Clarkson assumed command of X Corps and held that assignment during the Occupation of Japan. He later held various assignments, including command of the 3rd Infantry Division and later deputy commander, United States Army Pacific. Within the later assignment he also held additional duty as commander of the Joint Task Force 132 during 1952 Eniwetok Atomic bomb tests and as commander of Joint Task Force 7, which consisted of an Army-Navy-Air Force group running hydrogen bomb tests in the Pacific.

== Early career ==
Percy W. Clarkson was born on December 9, 1893, in San Antonio, Texas as the son of William Banton Clarkson and Alice Ann Peaples. His parents were immigrants from Liverpool, England. His father worked as a cotton broker in order to provide for Percy and his four siblings. His older brother Herbert also served in the Army, and reached the rank of brigadier general during World War II.

Clarkson completed high school in Houston and enrolled in the Texas A&M College in College Station, Texas in summer 1911. There, he was active in football, served as the vice-president of the San Antonio Club, and reached the rank of second lieutenant in the Corps of Cadets.

He graduated in 1915 with a Bachelor of Science degree in electrical engineering. After one year of working in the private sector, he applied for a commission the United States Army. He was commissioned second lieutenant in the Infantry Branch on November 30, 1916, and was ordered to the Army Service School at Fort Leavenworth, Kansas for officers' training.

Upon completion of his training in March 1917, Clarkson joined the 19th Infantry Regiment at Fort Sill, Oklahoma. He served for two months as platoon leader in Company "E" before being transferred to the headquarters company of 26th Infantry Regiment that May. Following the United States' entry into World War I and the forming of the 1st Division in June 1917, the 26th Infantry was assigned to the division. Clarkson was transferred to the machine gun company of his regiment and promoted to first lieutenant.

He embarked with the division to France in early 1918. Upon its arrival, the regiment immediately left for the front lines. Clarkson took part in the defense of the Ansauville sector in northeastern France in February and March 1918, but was wounded in action by the end of the month and was evacuated to the rear.

Following his recovery, Clarkson was promoted to captain and transferred to the General Headquarters, American Expeditionary Forces in Paris, France. There, he served as secretary of G-1 (personnel and administration) section for the rest of the war. He took part as an observer during the fighting on Aisne-Marne and Meuse–Argonne. For his service during the war, Clarkson was decorated with the Ordre des Palmes académiques by the government of France.

== Interwar period ==
Following the Armistice of 11 November 1918, Clarkson rejoined 26th Infantry Regiment and accompanied it during its occupation of the Rhineland, Germany. He returned to the United States by the end of July 1919, and was assigned to the Operations Division (G-3) of the War Department General Staff in Washington, D.C., remaining there until the end of the year. He was subsequently transferred to the Army Infantry School at Fort Benning, Georgia for duty as an instructor of tactics. He was transferred to the Department of Experiment of the Army Infantry School in July 1920, and served in that capacity for a year.

In September 1921, Clarkson was ordered to the Army Signal School at Fort Monmouth, New Jersey for an instruction. Upon its completion in June 1922, he remained there as an Instructor until August 1923, compiling training manuals. He was subsequently ordered back to the Army Infantry School at Fort Benning for Company Officers' Course, which he completed in June 1924. Clarkson was then ordered to Washington, D.C., where he joined the Office of the Chief of Infantry under Major General Robert H. Allen. He served in the Enlisted Man Department and became its commander on January 1, 1926.

Clarkson remained in that capacity until that September, when he returned to the Army Infantry School at Fort Benning for Advanced Course. After graduating the following June, he was ordered to the Army Command and General Staff School at Fort Leavenworth, Kansas, and completed a one-year course there in June 1928. He was subsequently promoted to major and ordered to the United States Military Academy at West Point, New York for duty as an assistant professor of Chemistry and Electricity.

After five years in this capacity, Clarkson was ordered to the Army War College in Washington, D.C. in order to prepare for senior leadership assignments. He graduated in June 1934 and entered the Field Officers' Course at Army Chemical Warfare School at Edgewood Arsenal, Maryland, which he completed three months later.

Following the completion of all studies, Clarkson returned to the Field Infantry service and joined the headquarters of 23rd Infantry Regiment at Fort Sam Houston, Texas. The regiment was a part of the 3rd Infantry Brigade under Brigadier General Alexander T. Ovenshine, who had previously commanded the 23rd Infantry. Ovenshine appointed Clarkson to his staff, and he served as an assistant to the assistant chief of staff for operations (G-3) until March 1937.

Clarkson was then appointed an assistant to the inspector of Eighth Corps Area (also located at Fort Sam Houston), and served under Colonel Charles P. George Jr. for the next three years. While in that capacity, he was promoted to lieutenant colonel in September 1938. In June 1940, Clarkson was transferred to Washington, D.C. and assigned to the Office of the assistant chief of staff for G-1 (administration), War Department General Staff, where he served under Brigadier General Wade H. Haislip as chief of the Officers' Branch. He was promoted to colonel in mid-October 1941.

== World War II ==
=== Early years ===
Shortly after his promotion, Clarkson was transferred to Camp Bowie, Texas, where he assumed duty as chief of staff of 36th Infantry Division under Major General Fred L. Walker. The 36th Division was made up of men from Texas National Guard and was undergoing the reorganization from a square division into a triangular division. Clarkson was co-responsible for the division's reorganization. Following his promotion to the temporary rank of brigadier general in late June 1942, he was transferred to newly activated 91st Infantry Division at Camp White, Oregon.

He assumed duty as assistant division commander under Major general Charles H. Gerhardt, and participated in the division's initial organization and training until that November, when he was promoted to the temporary rank of major general. He was subsequently tasked with the activation of 87th Infantry Division at Camp McCain, Mississippi, and held that command until October 1943.

=== New Guinea and Morotai ===
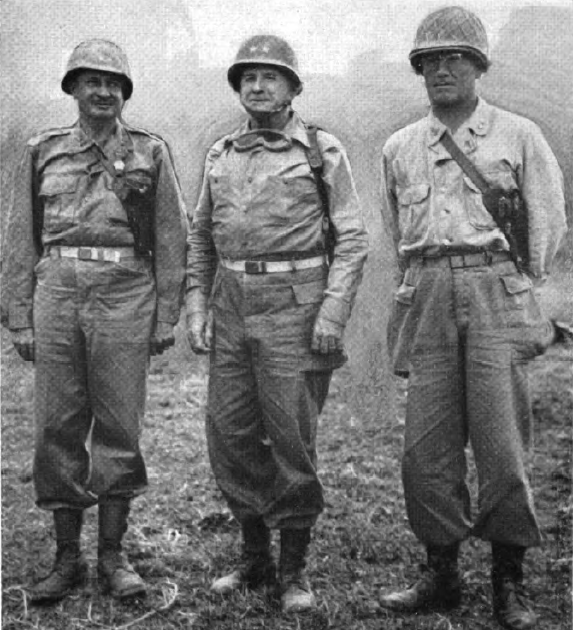
Clarkson (right) with Innis P. Swift (center), CG I Corps and Robert S. Beightler CG 37th Infantry Division in the Philippines, 1945

Clarkson was finally ordered for combat command in early November 1943, when he assumed command of the 33rd Infantry Division in Hawaii. His division was guarding installations and conducting training in jungle warfare there until late April 1944, when it began embarking for New Guinea for additional jungle training. After its arrival, the division was stationed near Finschhafen. Besides training, it was occupied with the unloading of allied cargo ships in order to lighten up naval traffic jam at Naval Base Finschhafen. Clarkson's command qualities were recognized by his superiors with the Legion of Merit, which he received in May 1944.

In late August 1944, Clarkson received orders to send a regimental combat team (RCT) built around the 123rd Infantry Regiment to Maffin Bay, Papua, in order to insure operation of Wakde Airdrome and to maintain its security. He chose his deputy, Brigadier General Donald J. Myers, to lead the task force, which met occasional enemy resistance consisting of snipers, machine gun nests, and enemy patrols. The RCT remained at Maffin Bay until the end of January 1945.

By mid-December, Clarkson received orders to move the rest of the division to Morotai, an island in the Dutch East Indies where a naval base with the airfield was constructed for the upcoming liberation of the Philippines. The Japanese 211th Infantry Regiment in the west of the island had consolidated its forces in order to counterattack U.S. forces, which had seized the island in mid-October. Clarkson ordered his division's 136th Infantry Regiment, supported by a battalion from 130th Infantry Regiment, to attack the Japanese, who meanwhile fortified around the Hill 40 mountain area in the dense jungle. Clarkson was also able to deploy divisional artillery battalions on the nearby islands of Ngelengele and Tilai, and recon troops north of Hill 40.

The fighting lasted for 20 days and ended on January 14, 1945, with 870 Japanese soldiers killed and ten captured, for a loss of 46 killed and 127 wounded and injured.

=== Philippines ===
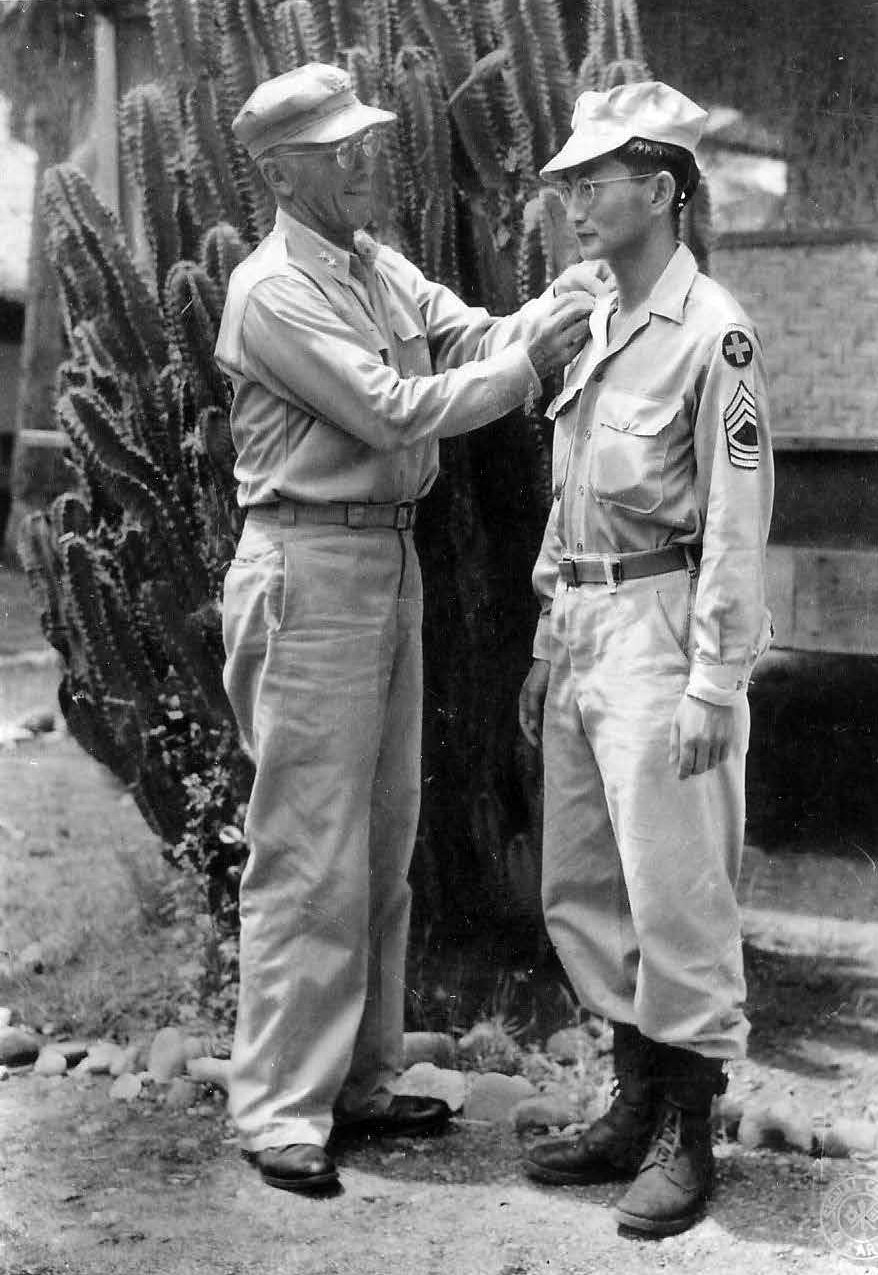
Clarkson promotes Sgt. Harry K. Fukuhara (translator) during the Philippines campaign in the summer of 1945.

After a week of rest at Morotai, Clarkson received orders to prepare his division for transport for Luzon in the Philippines. He led his division ashore on February 10, 1945, as part of the I Corps under the Sixth United States Army, and was tasked with the securing of terrain in the Demortis-Rosario-Pozorrubio area. The 33rd Division under Clarkson's command subsequently relieved 43rd Infantry Division and advanced to the Bench Mark and Question Mark hills in the Caraballo Mountains. The Japanese created a first line of defense there with a dense covering of machine gun nests, which caused heavy casualties.

Clarkson received a first-hand report from his deputy, General Myers, who described the critical situation, casualties, and need of water. Clarkson sent another battalion as reinforcements, and formed a 100-man carrying party from the divisional engineer battalion to deliver the water to the units in the forward area. The engineers made no attempt to conceal their disgust at being assigned such a menial chore, and protested this order. Detecting this discordant note, Clarkson grouped the engineers around him and discussed the importance of the situation. He then ordered the 33rd Division's artillery to fire on the enemy's positions with a following infantry companies assault. The Japanese positions were finally captured after four days of fighting, with 460 enemy soldiers killed in contrast to 35 killed and 82 wounded on the U.S. side.

The 33rd Division then advanced on Baguio, a summer capital of the Philippines and the headquarters of General Tomoyuki Yamashita, governor-general and military governor of the Philippines. Before the attack on Baguio, Clarkson led his division in the bitter three-month fighting to take Pugo, Mount Calugong, bridges in Bauang and finally Hill 24-A atop Mount Mirador, dominating Baguio. His division entered Baguio on April 22, 1945, from four directions, and immediately encountered heavy resistance. Retreating Japanese forces blew up all the bridges, so it was impossible for 33rd Division armor, artillery, and supply trains to properly support the ground forces engaging the Japanese.

After a week of heavy fighting, Clarkson declared the city secured, with over 2,000 Japanese killed. The 33rd Division then took Camp John Hay. After mopping up the area, it moved on to break the San Nicholas-Tebbo-Itogon route. During the liberation of Baguio, Manuel Roxas, a former aide to General Douglas MacArthur, was liberated. Clarkson and his division operated a long-range combat patrols around Daklan Airfield in the Northern Luzon in a systematic search for stragglers who had evaded the American forces before continued in the fighting in rugged terrain to take Pugo, Mount Calugong, and finally Hill 24-A atop Mount Mirador, dominating Baguio.

A month later, Clarkson and his division were tasked to restore civil administration in Baguio while other parts of the division were still engaging Japanese in the area of San Nicholas-Tebbo-Itogon route. The city, with a population of 30,000, was bombed out and almost destroyed. Clarkson appointed a civil affairs administrator from his division staff who organized the construction of huge tent camps for homeless citizens, established military hospitals for civilians in order to stop spreading of diseases, and provided them field rations. Divisional engineers repaired water purification plants, and employment offices were established where Filipinos could apply for work on constructing roads, building tent camps, or carrying material for the Army. For his service in the Philippines, Clarkson was decorated with the Distinguished Service Medal.

== Postwar service ==
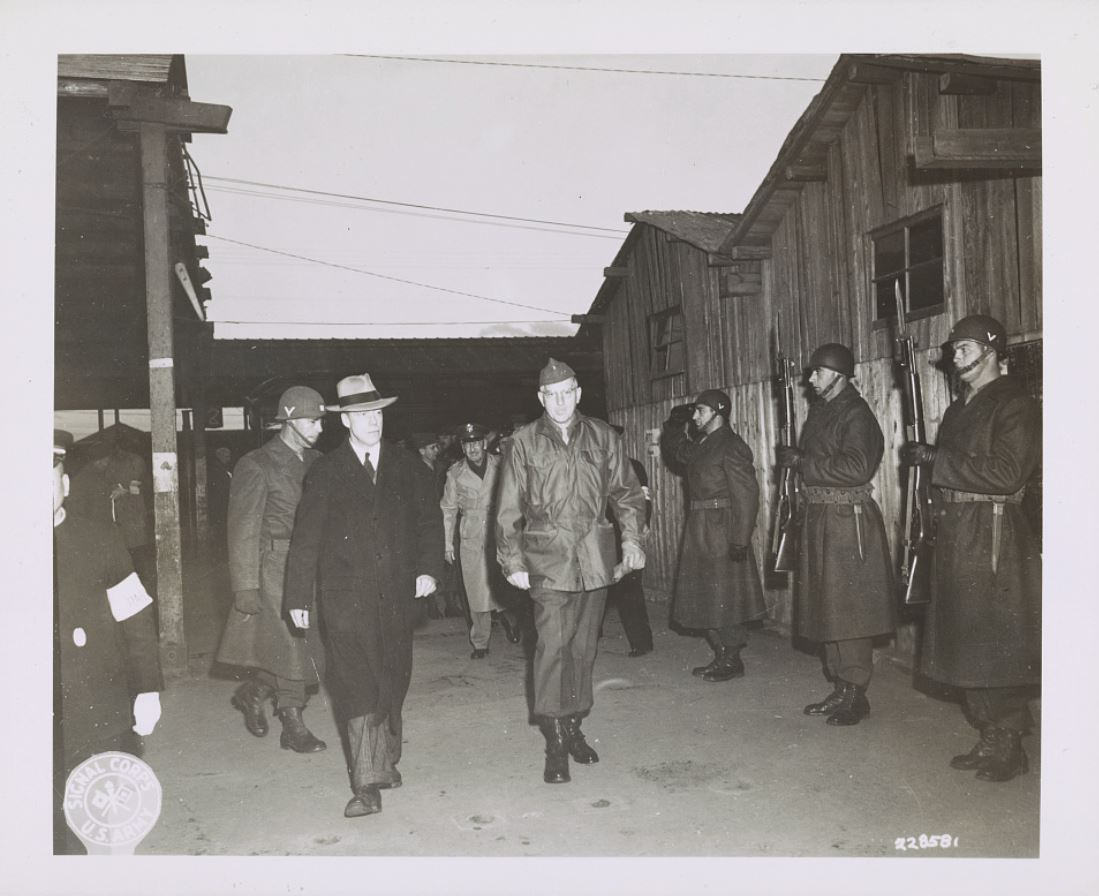
Clarkson welcomes Secretary of War Robert P. Patterson upon his arrival at Kure, Japan on January 10, 1946.

In late June 1945, Clarkson received orders to move his division to the beaches in the Caba-Aringay-Bauang area, set up camps, and commence amphibious training for the planned Invasion of Japan. However, the surrender of Japan on August 15, 1945 prevented the invasion from being executed. He led 33rd Division to Honshū, Japan for occupation duty in late September, but was promoted to the command of X Corps in mid-November 1945.

His headquarters was located at Kure, Japan. Clarkson was responsible for occupation forces in the southwestern Honshu and the island of Shikoku. The corps was inactivated on January 31, 1946, and Clarkson was transferred to Tokyo, where he assumed duty as deputy chief of staff at the headquarters of General Douglas MacArthur. He spent several months in that assignment, then returned to the United States in September 1946 for duty as deputy commander, Fourth United States Army at Fort Sam Houston, Texas, under General Jonathan M. Wainwright.

For his service in Japan, Clarkson received his second Distinguished Service Medal. His alma mater awarded him a Doctor of Laws degree in 1946.

In March 1947, Clarkson was transferred to Fort Campbell, Kentucky, where he assumed command of the 3rd Infantry Division. He later moved his headquarters to Fort Benning, Georgia, and supervised the training of his division in the months before the outbreak of the Korean War. He did not lead his division to the combat in Korea, and received orders for transfer to Hawaii in August 1950.

Clarkson then assumed duty as deputy commander, United States Army Pacific, with headquarters at Fort Shafter. He served consecutively under Lieutenant General Henry Aurand and John W. O'Daniel, and served additional duty as commander of the Joint Task Force 132 during 1952 Eniwetok atomic bomb tests. Clarkson's additional duties were later redesignated, and he became commander of Joint Task Force 7, which consisted of an Army-Navy-Air Force group running hydrogen bomb tests in the Pacific. He served in Hawaii until July 31, 1954, when he retired from active duty after 38 years of service.

Clarkson received his third Distinguished Service Medal for his service during the atomic bomb tests.

== Retirement ==
Following his retirement from the Army, Clarkson and his wife settled in San Antonio, Texas, where he assumed a job as chairman of the board of Fort Sam Houston National Bank. He was also a member of the San Antonio Chamber of Commerce, and served on the boards of trustees of the San Antonio Medical Foundation and Symphony Society of San Antonio.

He was active in the 33rd Division Veterans Association, where he was admired by his fellow officers. Among the officers who attended the reunion in December 1961 to pay tribute to him were General Walter Krueger, former commander Sixth Army; Brigadier General Andrew T. McAnsh, former 33rd Division chief of staff; Major General John S. Gleason Jr., former 33rd Division ordnance officer; Colonel Jacob Arvey, former judge-advocate of 33rd Division; and Brigadier General Frank S. Singer, former 33rd Division personnel officer.

Clarkson died on September 14, 1962, aged 68, at Brooke Army Medical Center at Fort Sam Houston, due to chronic pulmonary heart disease combined with bullous lung emphysema. He was buried with full military honors at Fort Sam Houston National Cemetery, Texas. He was survived by his wife, Lucy Kent Clarkson (1897–1966); a son, William Kent; a brother, Brigadier General Herbert S. Clarkson; and a sister-in-law, Virginia, who was a wife of Lieutenant General Withers A. Burress.

== Decorations ==
Here is the ribbon bar of Major General Percy W. Clarkson:

1st Row	Army Distinguished Service Medal with two Oak Leaf Clusters		Silver Star with Oak Leaf Cluster
2nd Row	Legion of Merit	Bronze Star Medal	Air Medal
3rd Row	Army Commendation Medal	Purple Heart	World War I Victory Medal with three battle clasps
4th Row	Army of Occupation of Germany Medal	American Defense Service Medal	American Campaign Medal
5th Row	Asiatic-Pacific Campaign Medal with two campaign stars	World War II Victory Medal	Army of Occupation Medal with Japan Clasp
6th Row	National Defense Service Medal	Philippine Liberation Medal with two stars	Ordre des Palmes académiques, Knight (France)
Presidential Unit Citation

== See also ==
- 33rd Infantry Division

Military offices
Preceded by William R. Schmidt	Commanding General 3rd Infantry Division; December 1947 – August 1950	Succeeded by Robert H. Soule
Preceded by Franklin C. Sibert	Commanding General X Corps; November 18, 1945 – January 31, 1946	Succeeded by Division deactivated
Preceded by John Millikin	Commanding General 33rd Infantry Division; October 1943 – November 1945	Succeeded by Winfred G. Skelton
Preceded by Division activated	Commanding General 87th Infantry Division; December 1942 – October 1943	Succeeded by Eugene M. Landrum
