= Robert H. Soule =

United States Army general (1900–1952)

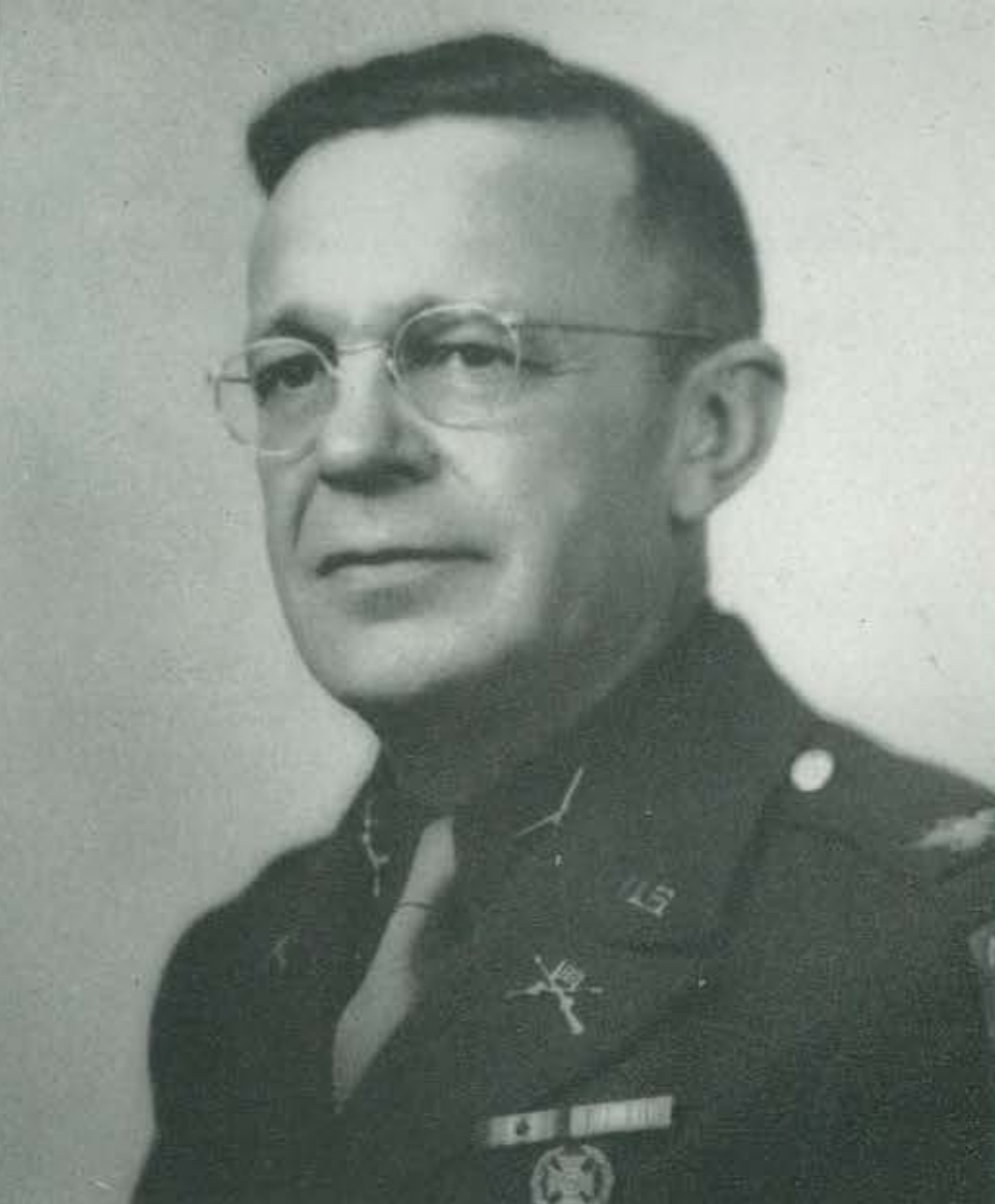
- Soule as 188th Glider Infantry Regiment commander c. 1944
- Born: February 10, 1900; Laramie, Wyoming
- Died: January 26, 1952 (aged 51); Washington, DC
- Burial place: Arlington National Cemetery
- Military career
- Allegiance: United States
- Branch: United States Army
- Service years: 1918–1952
- Rank: Major General
- Nickname: "Shorty"
- Service number: 0-11888
- Commands: 3rd Infantry Division; 188th Glider Infantry Regiment
- Conflicts: World War II: Battle of Leyte; Battle of Luzon; Raid at Los Baños; Korean War: Battle of Chosin Reservoir
- Awards: Distinguished Service Cross (2); Army Distinguished Service Medal; Silver Star (2); Legion of Merit (2); Bronze Star Medal (3); Purple Heart; Air Medal (3)

Major General Robert H. "Shorty" Soule (February 10, 1900 – January 26, 1952) was a senior officer in the United States Army. He commanded the 188th Glider Infantry Regiment of the 11th Airborne Division in the Philippines campaign during World War II. He later served as military attaché to the Republic of China, and commanded the 3rd Infantry Division during the Korean War. Soule died of a heart attack in Washington, D.C. He is buried at Arlington National Cemetery with his wife Genevieve Hoffman Soule (1898–1992).

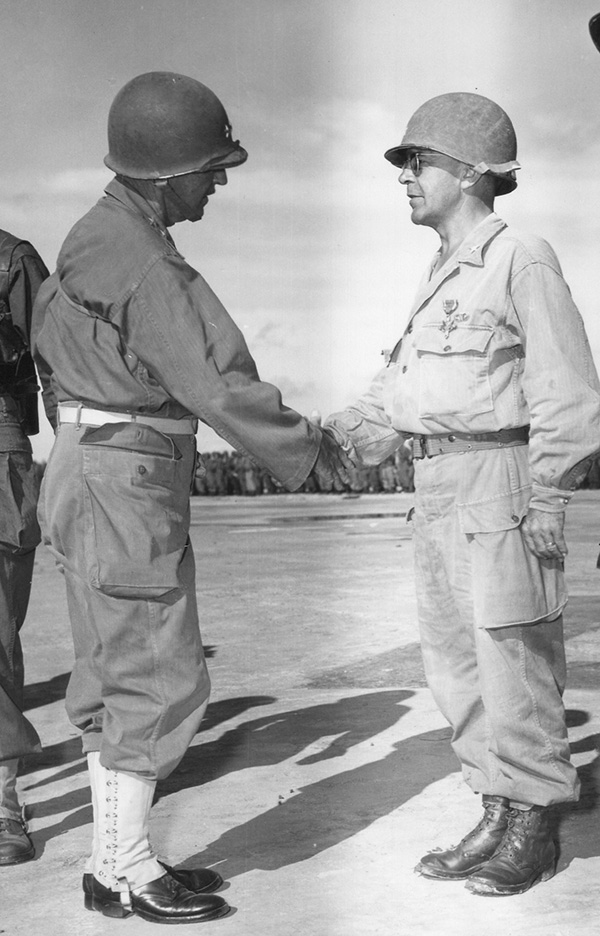
Colonel Soule (right) is awarded the Distinguished Service Cross, Luzon, Philippines, 1945

== Other sources ==
- Flanagan, Edward M. (1986) The Los Baños Raid: The 11th Airborne Jumps at Dawn (Presidio Books) ISBN 0-89141-250-6
- Flanagan, Edward M. (1988) The Angels: A History of the 11th Airborne Division 1943–1946 (The Battery Press) ISBN 0-89141-358-8
- Salecker, Gene Eric (2010) Blossoming Silk Against the Rising Sun: U.S. and Japanese Paratroopers at War in the Pacific in World War II (Stackpole Books) ISBN 0-8117-0657-5
- Henderson, Bruce (2015) Rescue at Los Baños: The Most Daring Prison Camp Raid of World War II (William Morrow) ISBN 978-0-06-232506-8

Military offices
Preceded by Percy W. Clarkson	Commanding General 3rd Infantry Division; 1950–1951	Succeeded by Thomas J. Cross
