= 188th Infantry Regiment (United States) =

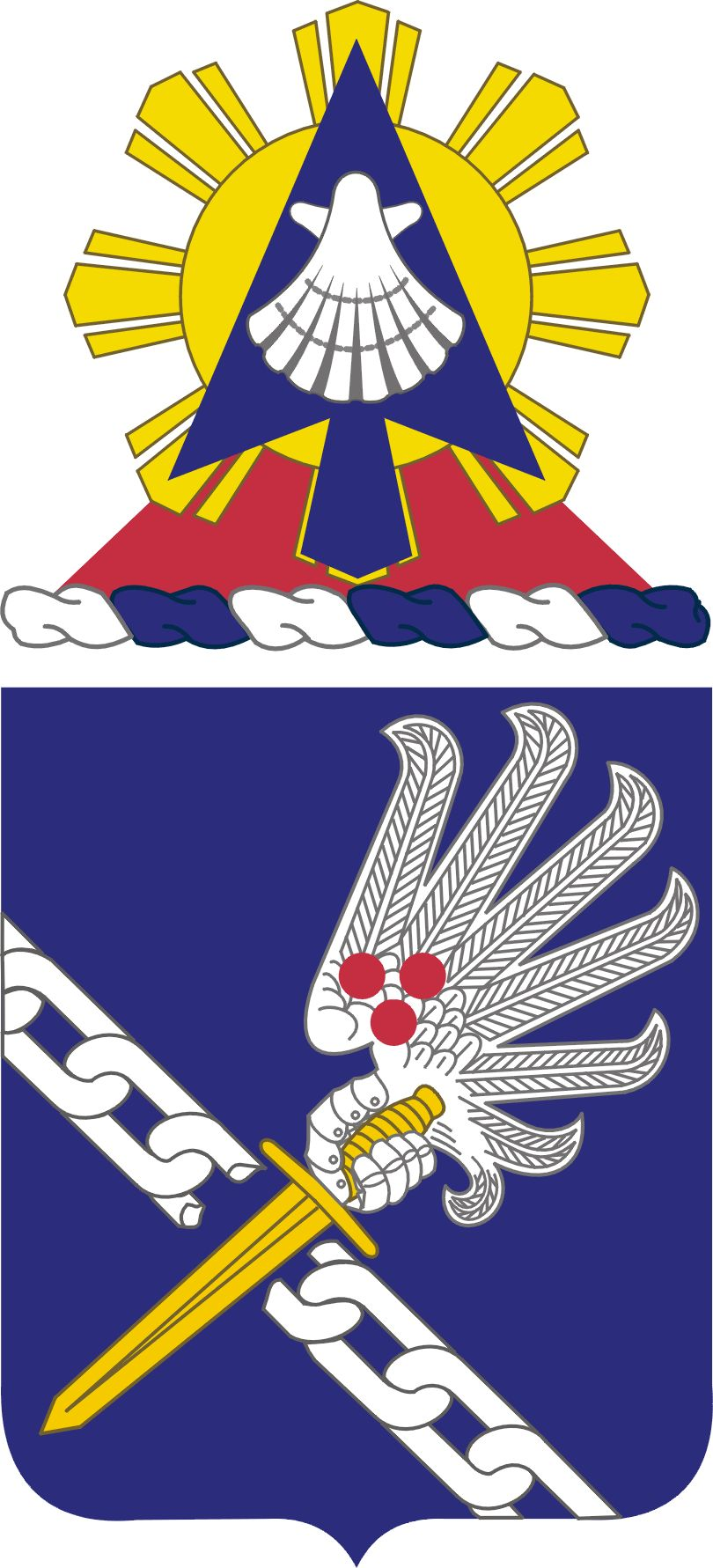
- 188th Infantry Regiment coat of arms
- Active: 1942–58, 1963-1965
- Country: United States
- Branch: United States Army
- Type: Parachute infantry
- Motto: "Winged Attack"
- Engagements: World War II

Commanders
- Notable commanders: Colonel Robert H. Soule

Insignia
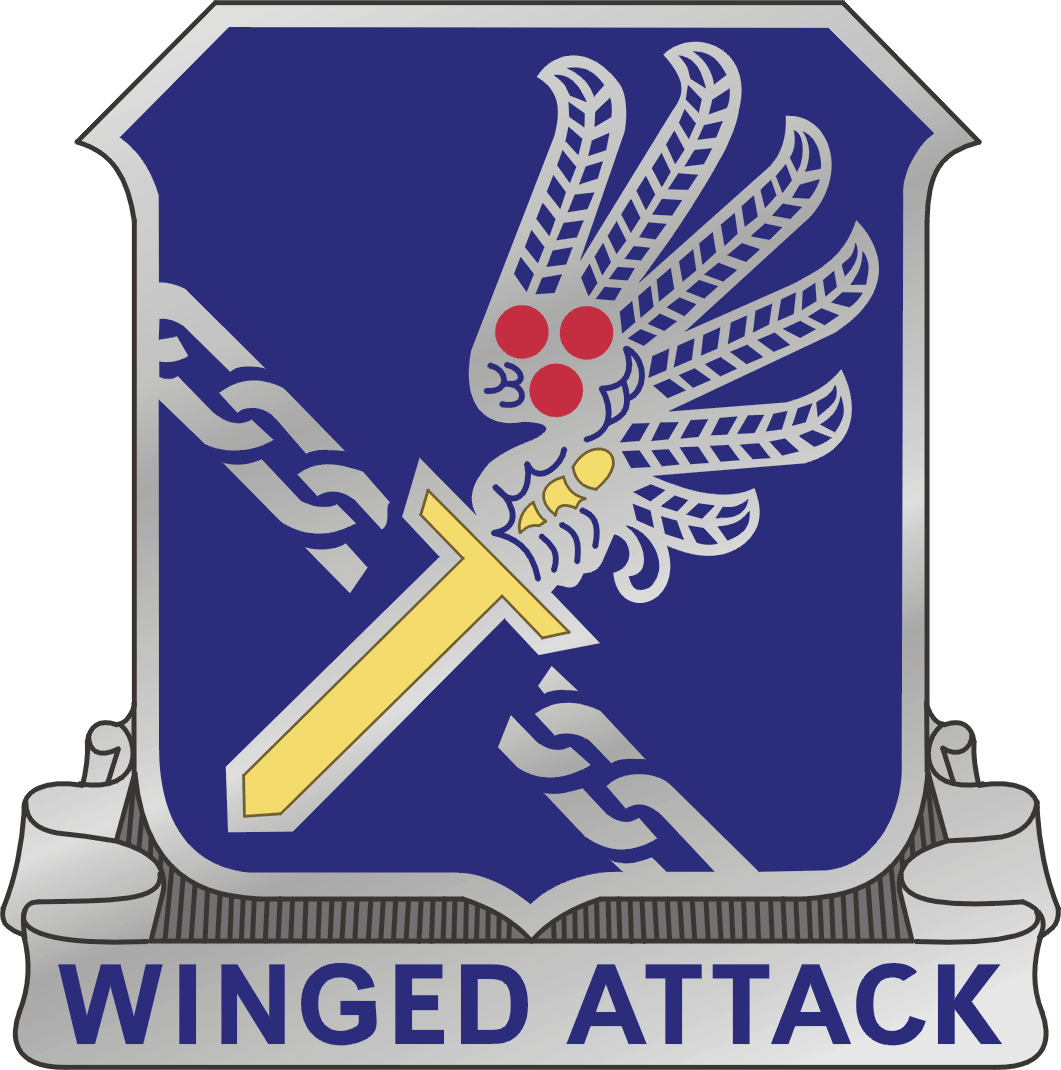
- Distinctive unit insignia

- 188th's Airborne Background Trimming

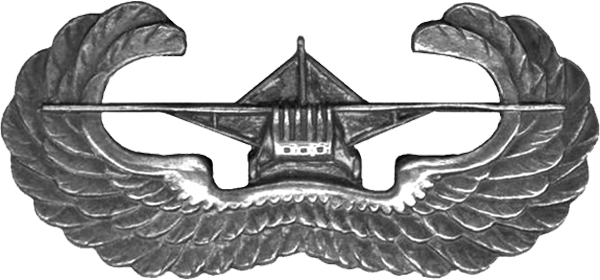
- The Glider Badge: Worn by U.S. Army airborne soldiers who rode gliders into combat

The 188th Glider Infantry Regiment was a regiment in the United States Army that was active during World War II. It was a part of the 11th Airborne Division.

The 188th Infantry Regiment was constituted on 12 November 1942 at Camp Mackall, North Carolina. On 25 February 1943, the 188th was activated under the command of Colonel Robert H. Soule. It was designated a glider regiment, and assigned to the 11th Airborne Division. A two battalion regiment, the 188th trained and prepared for combat with its men trained at the end of the war both as gliderists and parachutists. Subsequently, on 4 July 1945 the regiment was redesignated as the 188th Parachute Infantry.

In April, 1944 the 11th was moved to Camp Stoneman, 30 miles (48 km) east of San Francisco, California. The camp processed units for movement overseas. The 11th spent 6 days at the camp being fed extremely well and provided with as much entertainment as possible. One of the tasks at Stoneman was to learn what to do on a ship in case of an attack, and the need to abandon ship. By 11 May the division had sailed on several ships from the port of San Francisco for a 28-day voyage to New Guinea.

== New Guinea ==
The 11th landed as a reserve unit for the Hollandia Operation. Japanese still occupied the island and there was fighting in other parts of the island. Although the 11th had combat alert, they were not committed. By July, 1944 the Japanese had been cut off and isolated in New Guinea. In the meantime Admiral Nimitz's "Island Hopping" had retaken the Solomons, Gilberts, Marshals and Marianas. Between June, 1944 and that September, the 11th had become accustomed to the heat and the jungle conditions. This included jumping into razor sharp Hunai grass. Malaria medication also became a daily routine.

While they there, General MacArthur personally informed General Swing the 11th would be committed to a large operation. He was investigating an airborne assault. New training was centered on jump school and combat in the jungle, with an emphasis on live firing exercises. The entire 11th also had amphibious training whenever possible. General Swing took care of his troops in every way he deemed necessary to improve their survival and morale. His troops would realize after their combat experiences that he trained them hard, and well. He demanded the discipline they would need to survive. Staff and commanders were expected to bolster the welfare and morale of the men whenever possible.

This ghost unit was created for specific purposes, not known to others. It was not an authorized unit. The members, on paper, were assigned to various units within the division. This included the 511th, 187th, and 188th. It was an all volunteer unit, and those men could drop out any time without explanation. General Swing wanted a small, well trained unit at his disposal to use as necessary without any explanation. It would be a secret that remained within the 11th.

== The Philippines ==
On 3 October 1944 The Joint Chiefs of Staff approved MacArthur's commitment to return and free the Philippines. The 11th landed at Bito Beach on the Leyete Gulf in November, 1944. The 11th relieved the 7th Infantry Division and was ordered to search and destroy the enemy in their sector. The sector included a very rugged heavily forested mountain range which extended from the Cariaga Bay in the north to the Cabalian and Sogod Bays in the south. The 188th under Colonel "Shorty" Soule was to secure the southern part of the sector. The 188th 1st Battalion also patrolled and engaged the enemy as far as the west coast of Leyte. They protected the 511th as it moved west. When that was completed, the 188th turned and moved north. Unknown at the time, the increased Japanese buildup of ground forces on Leyte would result in major combat for the 11th.

The first Japanese offensive occurred 5 December 1944. It was a major attack by General Yamashita to recapture the airfields in the Burauen-Dulag area. Before Japanese paratroopers with fighter escort jumped, the Buri, San Pablo, and medium bombers strafed Buyug airstrips. The enemy was repelled, and the 1st of the 187th was ordered to clear the Buri strip as soon as possible. The Japanese retreated because they recognized it was more important to hold another location, Ormoc. At the Bayug strip the enemy had set fire to a number of planes that the 11th relied on to keep troops in the hills supplied.

=== Luzon ===
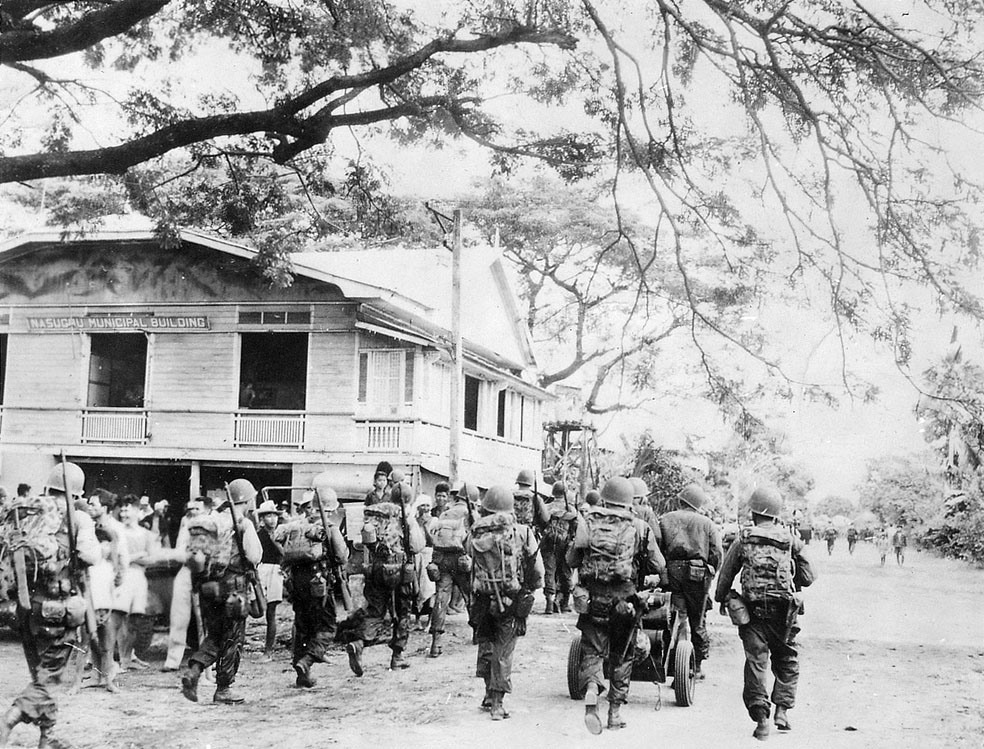
Troops of the 188th Glider Infantry Regiment make their way through the town of Nasugbu on the island of Luzon, 31 January 1945.

The 11th landed on 31 January 1945. Two glider combat teams landed amphibiously at a town, Nasugbu, on the west coast of the island of Luzon, south of Manila. The 188th 1st battalion Co. C was among them. The plan was that the 188th Infantry Regimental Combat Team would assault Nasughu first and secure a beachhead. Co. C of the 1st 188th was also ordered by Colonel Soule to follow and clear Japanese from the area to the north of the beach.

The landing was very dangerous. The seas were too calm, and the artillery supporting the 188th could not get ashore to suppress Japanese firepower. When the 2 Battalions of the 188th were organized on the shore, Colonel Soule then ordered them to push to an area, Tagaytay Ridge, to stop the enemy from setting up defensive positions against the 511th troopers who would be dropped there. As this occurred, the 187th relieved the 188th of the operations and defense of Nasugbu. General Eichelberger of the 8th Army had the 11th attached to his command. He bluffed the enemy into thinking a large force was moving up Highway 17 across Tagaytay Ridge heading for Manila. He ordered the men to move as fast as possible and make as much dust as possible. They were to fire as many weapons and artillery as possible.

The 188th spearheaded the push to Manila. They moved so fast under Colonel Soule that the Japanese were taken by surprise at the Palico River Bridge, and it was captured. Later on Highway 17 they ran into the best Japanese combat troops since their landing. With the 1st of the 187th and the 188th they launched another major attack against Japanese defenses on Mount Aiming near Tagaytay Ridge.

The attack began the morning of 1 February 1945. A Co. of the 188th withstood 4 hours of continuous counterattacks, and one Banzai attack. It continued to the morning of 3 February 1945 when the 188th and the 1st of the 187th launched an attack against the 3rd and final enemy position. The Japanese responded with heavy artillery and machine gun fire.

The 188th and 1st of the 187th were pinned down along with several high-ranking officers. Two battalions of Japanese artillery were pounding the area of Tagaytay Ridge. In the final assault the 188th and the 1st of the 187th used flamethrowers and grenades to overtake an area of the ridge that was later renamed "Shorty Ridge". As a result, the 11th that landed amphibiously (187th & 188th) were ready to make contact with the 511th paratroopers who on 3 February 1945 were landing to the east on Tagaytay Ridge.

After the 188th made contact with the 511th, they continued to clear enemy from the ridges and slopes south of the ridge, as well as from the caves and tunnels on "Shorty Ridge". It was then discovered that the ridge was honeycombed with enormous supply tunnels, reinforced concrete caves, as well as strong guns and individual firing positions. Then next day, 4 February 1945, a wounded Colonel Soule (recipient of the Distinguished Service Cross) would continue to lead the rest of the 188th, less one company to keep the ridge secure, on foot towards Manila.

=== Manila ===
Before its liberation the city of Manila and its people would suffer horrific destruction of its buildings and people. By the fall of 1944 there were 800,000 people in Manila. The Japanese had already destroyed large parts of the city and converted houses into machine gun nests. As the Americans advanced, Filipinos tried to flee the city. The Japanese retaliated with torture and other atrocities that they had used against civilians before. Nursing women were bayoneted in their breasts. People's tendons in the back of their necks were severed with sabers, so that a person could no longer hold their head up. Small children and babies were also bayoneted. Soon the 11th would face their own horrors and suffer heavy losses against the Japanese fortified Genko Line outside Manila. 12,500 Japanese were guarding Manila in an entrenched protected fortified area south of Manila, including Nichols Field and Fort William McKinley.

By 6 February 1945 the 511th had stormed into the southern suburbs of Manila. On 7 February 1945, the 188th attacked the area around Nichols Field, while the 511th fought house to house and in the streets. On 10 February 1945, the 1st of the 188th was pinned down by heavy machine fire until a Major Loeper led them in an attack on enemy positions. He died in action, and was later award the Distinguished Service Cross.

Nevertheless, by 11 February 1945, the Japanese firepower at Nichols Field remained unchanged. For this reason a full-scale attack was launched by the 187th and the 188th. The fighting was to the death with hand-to-hand combat using bayonets and knives. By nightfall, the 187th and 188th had cleared most of the field of enemy combatants. The next objective was Fort Mc Kinley itself. By 17 February 1945 the attack on the fort had begun. The plan called for the 188th, the 2nd of the 187th and the 511th to pivot and strike the Fort. They were to meet at the Caribon Gate of Fort McKinley.

By the next day the 1st of the 188th was within the fort, and joined by the 511th. The rest of the enemy retreated to the east. All organized resistance in Manila would not cease until the beginning of March. By then the 11th had control of the city and achieved their first of 2 goals given to them by Mac Arthur. The next task was the freeing of civilian POWS at the Los Baños Camp.

=== Raid at Los Baños ===
Since the beginning of the Philippines campaign, it was a priority of General MacArthur that both civilians and soldiers held in Japanese camps be rescued as soon as possible. He feared retribution on them, as the Japanese suffered defeats. The Los Baños Camp held more than 2,000 civilians of all ages, and nationalities who were captured during the Japanese invasion. The rescue would involve sending the 11th, 40 miles (64 km) behind Japanese lines. Also, a 90-minute march away from the camp were 9,000 battle hardened soldiers of the Japanese 19th Division, known as the "Tiger Division" at tiger hills.

In order to have a plan, Sgt. John Fulton of the 511th Signal Co. volunteered to join Filipino guerrillas in the area. For a few weeks he lived with them and transmitted information back to the 11th. He had also made contact with some young men who were sneaking out at night from the camp to search for food. In this way a rescue plan was designed to overtake the guards by surprise. Its success was dependent on knowing the camp routine, especially that of the guards.

The plan would involve the 672nd Amphibious Tractor Battalion, the 1st of the 511th and the 188th under Colonel Soule. Co. B of the 511th would lead a parachute attack on the camp. C. Co. of the 511th would jump and eliminate a small Japanese force nearby and set up a roadblock near the town of Los Baños. A Co. of the 511th would jump and also set up another roadblock to intercept the enemy. All the men were greatly outnumbered should this attack and rescue go wrong.

Again under the command of General Joe Swing, the attack began on 23 February 1945 at 7:00 a.m. The time was chosen because advance information had placed the guards at that time away from their weapons, doing calisthenics. The 511th easily overtook them. Several hours later the entire population had been moved and transported amphibiously across a large body of water to a safe area While the attack on the camp was occurring, the 188th had attacked Japanese positioned near the camp at the San Juan River. By midmorning they had cleared the area of the enemy and marched towards Los Baños to provide more fighting power for the rescue. When Colonel Soule saw the Amtracs filled with the internees on Laguna de Bay moving to a safe location, Mamated, he gave new orders. He ordered a bridgehead near the San Juan River, and blocked the road from Santo Tomas, where the Tiger Marines were positioned. The 188th placed themselves directly in their path to Los Baños, should they be alerted. Fortunately, this did not occur. It would have been a death sentence for every man. The 188th was credited with the success of the raid and the protection of the 511th and others transporting the internees.

Besides Los Baños the 1st of the 188th, was ordered to clear the southern sector of Luzon of any enemy. They attacked in an area known as Ternate and the Pico de Loro Hills on the southern shore of Manila Bay. This action took one month. The Japanese were again using a cave defense system. The artillery and mortars couldn't hit their targets because of the terrain, and razor sharp thickets hid the caves. It required man-to-man combat. After this sector was captured by the 188th, they found 40 Japanese suicide Q boats used to ram American ships. The 1st lost 40 men and 103 wounded in action in one month. In April they were again engaged in another attack.

The entire division committed 105 days of combat from the landing at Nasugbu to the end of the Southern Luzon campaign with a battle at Malepungo. The last operation was Operation Aparri on 23 June 1945. 7 gliders were used, to drop troops, for the first time in the Pacific Theater. This was the end of the Luzon Campaign. The next destination would be the invasion of Japan. The 11th was poised to be among the first to lead the invasion. To that end the 11th was retrained, reorganized and sent on R&R to Australia. The 188th and the 674th became parachute units 20 July 1945 (glider regiments had been increased to 3 battalions).

Then the decision to use the atomic bomb on Japan changed the course of history. It was estimated that the U.S. would lose approximately one million men in an invasion, because of fanatical resistance by the population as well as the homeland troops. After 2 Atomic bombs were dropped, Japan was forced to an unconditional surrender.

== Occupation, Japan ==
The 11th was selected by General Mac Arthur to lead the Allied Forces in occupying Japan. On 30 August 1945, the 188th were the first to land on Japanese soil at the Atsugi Airdrome with 1096 men. The 187th quickly followed with 1257 men and the 511th with 1165 men.
