= Frank L. Culin Jr. =

U.S. Army major general (1892–1967)

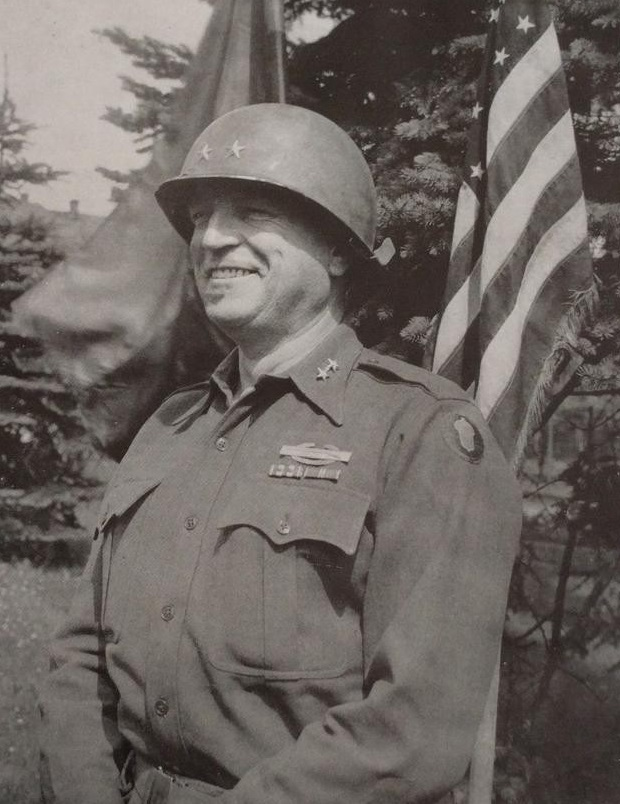
- From 1946's 345th Infantry Regiment/87th Infantry Division Yearbook
- Born: March 31, 1892; Seattle, Washington, United States
- Died: December 31, 1967 (aged 75); Pebble Beach, California, United States
- Burial place: Evergreen Memorial Park, Tucson, Arizona, United States
- Education: University of Arizona
- Spouse: Ella Greene Sneed (m. 1918-1967, his death)
- Children: 3
- Military career
- Allegiance: United States
- Branch: United States Army
- Service years: 1916−1946
- Rank: Major General
- Service number: 0-4717
- Unit: Infantry Branch
- Commands: Reserve Officers' Training Corps, University of Oregon; 32nd Infantry Regiment; 87th Infantry Division; Infantry Replacement Center, Camp Blanding, Florida
- Conflicts: Pancho Villa Expedition; World War I World War II
- Awards: Army Distinguished Service Medal; Silver Star (3); Bronze Star Medal; Air Medal; Combat Infantryman Badge
- Other work: Real estate sales

Major General Frank L. Culin Jr. (March 31, 1892 – December 31, 1967) was a career officer in the United States Army. A recipient of the Army Distinguished Service Medal, Silver Star, Bronze Star Medal, and Air Medal, he was a veteran of both World War I and World War II. Culin attained the rank of major general and was most notable for his command of the 87th Infantry Division in the Ardennes Forest during the Battle of the Bulge in the final months of World War II.

== Early life ==
Frank L. Culin Jr. was born in Seattle, Washington on March 31, 1892, a son of Frank Lewis Culin and Elizabeth I. Harding. Culin's brother John Harding Culin was a graduate of the United States Naval Academy and career Navy officer who died in 1925 while serving as a lieutenant commander. The Culin family moved to San Francisco, then in 1903 to Tucson, Arizona. The senior Culin was a corporate accountant who later became active in business ventures including real estate and insurance, and served in local offices including Pima County superintendent of schools.

The younger Culin attended the schools of Seattle, San Francisco, and Tucson, and began attendance at Tucson High School in 1906. He graduated in 1910, then began attendance at the University of Arizona's preparatory school. Culin then commenced studies at the University of Arizona, from which he graduated in 1915 with a Bachelor of Science degree in mining engineering. In 1916, he received a Master of Science degree in mining engineering from the University of Arizona.

During Culin's prep school and college years, he belonged to the university's corps of cadets and took part in its military science program. Over the years of his participation, he advanced through the ranks to become cadet lieutenant colonel, the highest rank a student could achieve. Culin served as student body president from 1915 to 1916, and was a member of Kappa Sigma fraternity. In addition, he was athletic editor of the Desert, the University of Arizona yearbook.

The university's academic prizes and honors included the Troutman Medals, gold and silver awards created by Dr. George D. Troutman to recognize excellence in chemistry. Culin was the recipient of the gold Troutman Medal for the 1911–1912 school year.

After graduating, Culin worked as a mining engineer, and his employers included the university's Bureau of Mines, Los Chisos Mining Company of Terlingua, Texas and Calumet and Arizona (C&A) Mining Company of Bisbee, Arizona.

== Start of career ==
In September 1916, Culin applied for a United States Army commission as the Army began to expand in anticipation of entry into World War I. Five of the 15 applicants who sat for the examination in Nogales, Arizona were accepted, including Culin. On November 30, 1916, he was appointed a second lieutenant of Infantry. His first service was on the U.S.-Mexico border with the Pancho Villa Expedition, followed by attendance at the Army Service School at Fort Leavenworth, Kansas. Upon graduating in April 1917, the same month of the American entry into World War I, he was assigned to the 30th Infantry Regiment.

By the summer of 1918, the 30th Infantry had arrived in France as part of the 3rd Division. Culin commanded the 30th Infantry's machine gun company, and served with his regiment during several campaigns, including Aisne, Aisne-Marne; St. Mihiel, and Meuse-Argonne.

== Continued career ==
=== Military education ===
In addition to the Army Service School, Culin's military education included the advanced course for Infantry officers (1928), the Command and General Staff College (1930) and the Army War College (1940).

=== Effective dates of promotion ===
Culin's effective dates of promotion were:

Second lieutenant, September 1916
First lieutenant, September 1916
Captain, August 1917
Major, November 1928
Lieutenant colonel, October 1938
Colonel, October 1941
Brigadier general, June 1943
Major general, March 1945
Major general (retired), November 30, 1946

=== Post-World War I ===
After the war, Culin served in staff and command assignments of increasing rank and responsibility, including a posting to the Philippines in the early 1920s. From 1923 to 1927, he commanded the Reserve Officers' Training Corps program at the University of Oregon.

In the 1930s, Culin served with the 25th Infantry Regiment at Fort Huachuca, Arizona and senior advisor and instructor for the 169th Infantry Regiment, a unit of the Connecticut National Guard. In 1937, Culin was assigned to the staff of the National Guard Bureau.

== World War II ==
In 1940, Culin was assigned as executive officer of the 32nd Infantry Regiment, based at Fort Ord, California. At the start of World War II, Culin was assigned to command of the regiment. He took part in the Aleutian Islands campaign, and the 32nd Infantry participated in the defeat of the Japanese during the May 1943 Battle of Attu, part of the Aleutian Islands campaign.

In July 1943, Culin was assigned as deputy commander of the newly organized 10th Light Division (Alpine), and he took part in the unit's initial organization and training. In October 1944, Culin was assigned to command the 87th Infantry Division. The division organization and training in the United States and England before arriving in France in late 1944. Culin's command took part in the Ardennes, Rhineland, and Central Europe campaigns.

== Later career ==
After returning to the United States following the end of World War II, Culin commanded the Infantry Replacement Center at Camp Blanding, Florida. He was subsequently assigned to an Army board based at Fort Lewis, Washington which considered and made recommendations on the applications of reserve officers for regular army commissions. In 1946, Culin was retired for disability incurred in the line of duty.

=== Retirement and death ===
In retirement, Culin settled in Monterey County, California, where he worked in real estate sales. He died in Pebble Beach, California on December 31, 1967. Culin was buried at Evergreen Memorial Park in Tucson.

== Family ==
In 1918, Culin married Ella Greene Sneed (1897–1980), whom he had met when both were students at the University of Arizona. They were the parents of a daughter, Virginia (1921–2010) and two sons, Frank L. Culin III (1922–2006) and John Edward Culin (1925–2007).

Virginia Cullin was the wife of James Boyce Scott (1916–1961), an Army veteran who later served as a judge of the Arizona Superior Court. She was also a speaker and author on Arizona history, and her published works included Outpost in the Desert, Pioneers in the Desert and With Their Own Blood.

Frank Culin III was a World War II and Korean War veteran who later worked in Arizona as a civil engineer. John E. Culin was a graduate of the United States Military Academy and a career Army officer. A veteran of the Vietnam War, after concluding his military service with the rank of colonel he built a second career as a commodities trader.

== Awards ==
=== Military awards ===
The military decorations Culin received during his career included the Combat Infantryman Badge, Army Distinguished Service Medal (1945), Silver Star with 3 Oak leaf clusters (1918, 1943, 1945), Bronze Star Medal (1945), and Air Medal (1945). His service awards included the: Mexican Border Service Medal; World War I Victory Medal with five battle clasps; American Defense Service Medal; Asiatic–Pacific Campaign Medal; European–African–Middle Eastern Campaign Medal with three campaign stars; and World War II Victory Medal. The citation for his Army DSM reads:

The President of the United States of America, authorized by Act of Congress July 9, 1918, takes pleasure in presenting the Army Distinguished Service Medal to Major General Frank L. Culin, Jr. (ASN: 0-4717), United States Army, for exceptionally meritorious and distinguished services to the Government of the United States, in a duty of great responsibility from January to May 1945.

Culin's foreign decorations included the French Legion of Honor (Chevalier) and Croix de Guerre with Palm, and the Belgian Croix de Guerre with Palm.

=== Civilian awards ===
In 1944, Culin was a recipient of the University of Arizona Alumni Achievement Award. In 1960 he was one of the UA alumni awarded the Medallion of Merit during the university's 75th anniversary celebration.

Military offices
Preceded by Eugene M. Landrum	Commanding General 87th Infantry Division; 1944–1945	Succeeded by Post deactivated
