= Gros-Réderching =

- Commune
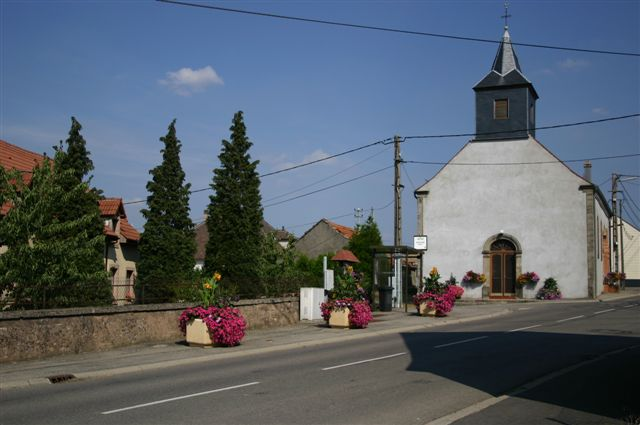
- The chapel in Singling

- Coat of arms
- Location of Gros-Réderching
- Location within France Location within Grand Est
- Coordinates: 49°04′07″N 7°13′10″E
- Country: France
- Region: Grand Est
- Department: Moselle
- Arrondissement: Sarreguemines
- Canton: Bitche
- Intercommunality: CC du Pays de Bitche

Government
  - Mayor (2020–2026): Norbert Dor
- Area^{1}: 15.73 km^{2} (6.07 sq mi)
- Elevation: 105 m (344 ft)
- Highest elevation: 376 m (1,234 ft)
- Lowest elevation: 256 m (840 ft)
- Population (2023): 1,266
  - Density: 80.48/km^{2} (208.5/sq mi)
- Time zone: UTC+01:00 (CET)
  - Summer (DST): UTC+02:00 (CEST)
- INSEE/Postal code: 57261 /57410
- ^{1} French Land Register data, which excludes lakes, ponds, glaciers > 1 km^{2} (0.386 sq mi or 247 acres) and river estuaries.

Gros-Réderching (French pronunciation: [ɡʁo ʁedɛʁʃɛ̃]; German: Großrederchingen; Lorraine Franconian: Grossrederschinge) is a commune in the Moselle department of the Grand Est administrative region in north-eastern France.

The village belongs to the Pays de Bitche. The similarly named commune Petit-Réderching lies 6 km to the east. Localities of the commune: Brandelfing, Olferding, Welschhoff and Singling which is a former neighbour commune and a part of Gros-Réderching since 1811.

== See also ==
- Communes of the Moselle department
