= In vivo =

Process of testing biological interventions on whole, living organisms

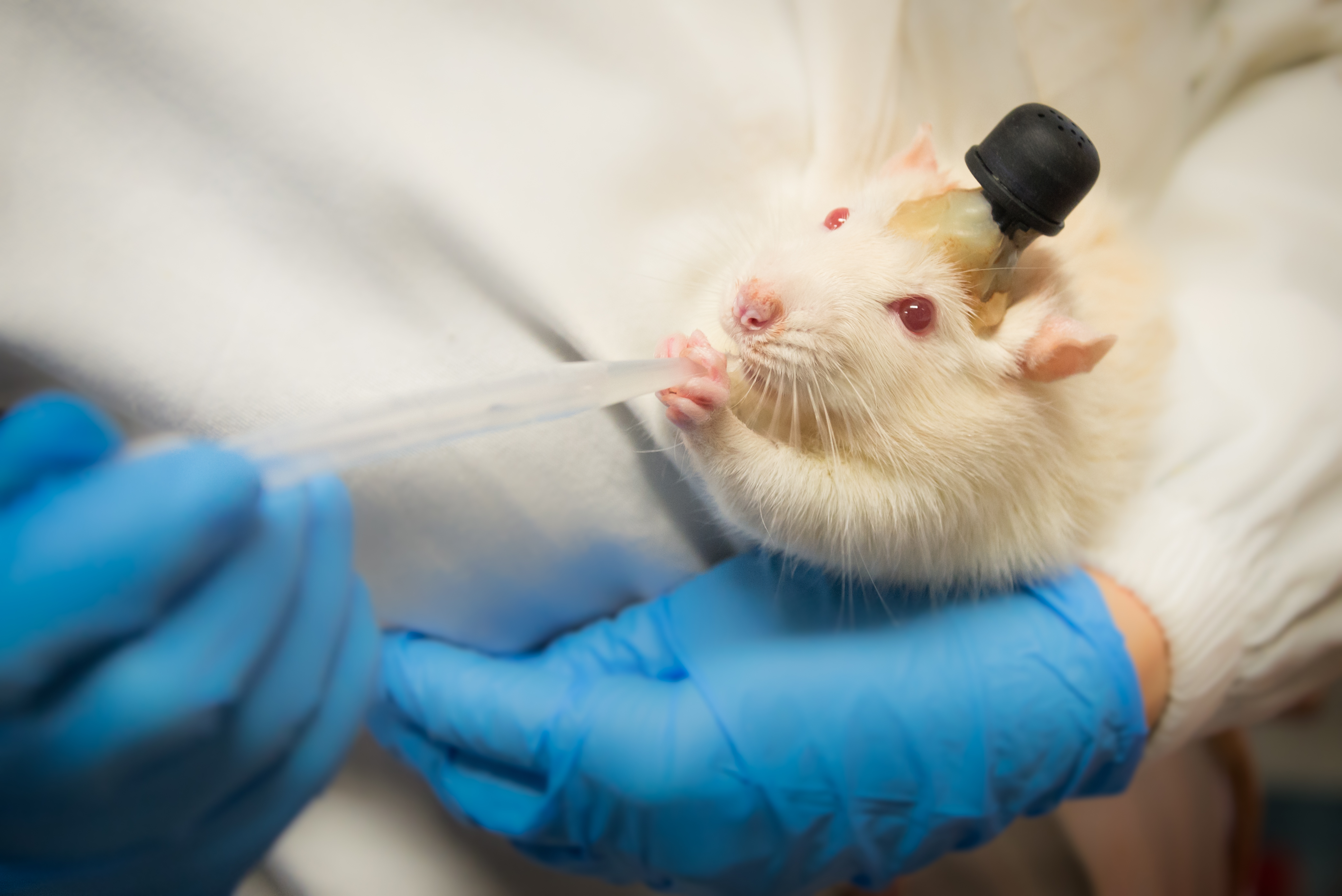
A laboratory rat with a brain implant, that was used to record in vivo neuronal activity

Studies that are in vivo (Latin for "within the living"; often not italicized in English) are those in which the effects of various biological entities are tested on whole, living organisms or cells, usually animals, including humans, and plants, as opposed to a tissue extract or dead organism.

Examples of investigations in vivo include: the pathogenesis of disease by comparing the effects of bacterial infection with the effects of purified bacterial toxins; the development of non-antibiotics, antiviral drugs, and new drugs generally; and new surgical procedures. Consequently, animal testing and clinical trials are major elements of in vivo research. In vivo testing is often employed over in vitro because it is better suited for observing the overall effects of an experiment on a living subject. In drug discovery, for example, verification of efficacy in vivo is crucial, because in vitro assays can sometimes yield misleading results with drug candidate molecules that are irrelevant in vivo (e.g., because such molecules cannot reach their site of in vivo action, for example as a result of rapid catabolism in the liver).

The English microbiologist Professor Harry Smith and his colleagues in the mid-1950s found that sterile filtrates of serum from animals infected with Bacillus anthracis were lethal for other animals, whereas extracts of culture fluid from the same organism grown in vitro were not. This discovery of anthrax toxin through the use of in vivo experiments had a major impact on studies of the pathogenesis of infectious disease.

The maxim in vivo veritas ("in a living thing [there is] truth") is a play on in vino veritas, ("in wine [there is] truth"), a well-known proverb.

== Levels of closeness to the natural state ==
Latin phrases used to describe the closeness of a wet lab experiment setup to the natural state include:

- In natura ("in nature"), the exact natural state
- In vivo ("in the living"), with a living being (usually the whole organism, in a controlled environment)
- Ex vivo ("out of the living"), with part of a living being (usually tissues, organs, or cells)
- In vitro ("in the glass"), usually either a cell culture or a mixture of sub-cellular components (disrupted cell, purified biomolecules)

Different subfields of biology have a tendency to use each word differently. Notable variations from the above include:

- Toxicologists lump ex vivo into in vitro: any data not obtained using a whole animal is in vitro.
- Molecular biologists working on single-celled organisms may refer to a living microbe culture as in vivo, reserving in vitro for cell-free systems.
- There are also cases of mammalian cell cultures being referred to as in vivo.

== Methods of use ==
According to Christopher Lipinski and Andrew Hopkins, "Whether the aim is to discover drugs or to gain knowledge of biological systems, the nature and properties of a chemical tool cannot be considered independently of the system it is to be tested in. Compounds that bind to isolated recombinant proteins are one thing; chemical tools that can perturb cell function another; and pharmacological agents that can be tolerated by a live organism and perturb its systems are yet another. If it were simple to ascertain the properties required to develop a lead discovered in vitro to one that is active in vivo, drug discovery would be as reliable as drug manufacturing." Studies on In vivo behavior, determined the formulations of set specific drugs and their habits in a Biorelevant (or Biological relevance) medium.

== See also ==
- In ovo
- In papyro
- In silico
- In simulacra
- In situ
- In utero
- In vivo imaging
- Vivisection
