= Infantile systemic hyalinosis =

- Other names: Juvenile systemic hyalinosis
- Infantile systemic hyalinosis is inherited in an autosomal recessive manner.
- Specialty: Dermatology, medical genetics

Infantile systemic hyalinosis is an allelic autosomal-recessive condition characterized by multiple skin nodules, hyaline deposition, gingival hypertrophy, osteolytic bone lesions and joint contractures.

== Genetics ==
This disease is caused by mutations in the CMG2 gene (ANTXR2).

== See also ==
- Skin lesion
- List of cutaneous conditions
