= Timothy Wetjen =

English rugby union player

Timothy Wetjen (born 3 December 1991 (age 34)) is an English rugby union footballer.

Wetjen was born in Canterbury on 3 December 1991. He is a youth player at Maidstone Rugby Club but had been being pushed through the ranks. He has been trialled with professional side London Wasps in the 2008-2009 Season. He broke onto the International 7s scene in 2007 with the District squads around the London & SE sector. He suffered neck and back injuries in the 2006 season however battled back to fitness and under the wing of Pete Barford forced his way into the public eye once again.

== Honours ==
- Kent Cup Finalist
- East Coast Challenge Cup Champion 2008
- London Wasps Trialist
- Accepted to Worcester Warriors Academy 2009
