= Simulacra (disambiguation) =

A simulacra or simulacrum is a representation or imitation of a thing or person.

Simulacra may also refer to:

- Simulacra (video game), a 2017 horror video game developed by Kaigan Games.
- Simulacrum (album), an album composed by John Zorn and released in 2015.
- Simulacra and Simulation, a 1981 philosophical treatise written by Jean Baudrillard.
- The Simulacra, a 1964 dystopian science fiction novel written by Philip K. Dick.

== See also ==
- Simulcra, a 1990 video game developed by Graftgold.
- In simulacra, Latin phrase regarding experiments.
