= In vitro =

Latin term meaning outside a natural biological environment

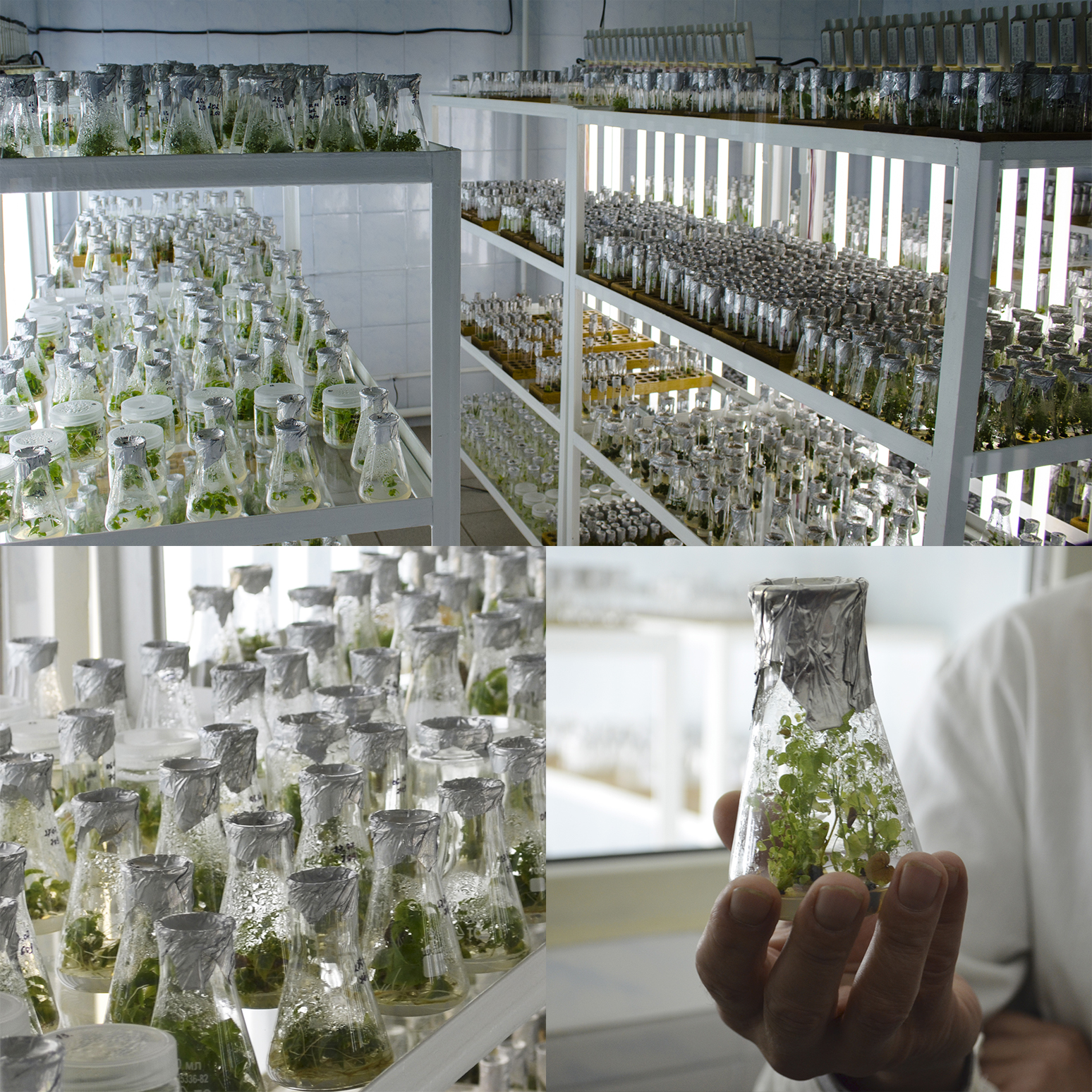
Cloned plants in vitro

In vitro (meaning in glass, or in the glass) studies are performed with cells or biological molecules outside their normal biological context. Colloquially called "test-tube experiments", these studies in biology and its subdisciplines are traditionally done in labware such as test tubes, flasks, Petri dishes, and microtiter plates. Studies conducted using components of an organism that have been isolated from their usual biological surroundings permit a more detailed or more convenient analysis than can be done with whole organisms; however, results obtained from in vitro experiments may not fully or accurately predict the effects on a whole organism. In contrast to in vitro experiments, in vivo studies are those conducted in living organisms, including humans, known as clinical trials, and whole plants.

== Definition ==
In vitro (Latin for "in glass"; often not italicized in English usage) studies are conducted using components of an organism that have been isolated from their usual biological surroundings. As the name suggests, in vitro experiments, colloquially "test-tube experiments", are traditionally done in glass labware, using test tubes, flasks, Petri dishes, etc.

The exact scope of in vitro depends on what is considered to be in vivo (experiments done on whole living beings), and in turn what is considered to be a "whole" living being:

- Toxicology and pharmacology mainly concern the effects of a substance on a multi-cellular lifeform, usually an animal. As a result, anything that is not in vivo is in vitro. This includes animal organ cultures, animal tissue cultures (ex vivo), animal cell cultures, prokaryotic cell cultures, and isolated biomolecules.
- The study of pathogens treats the pathogen-in-host state as in vivo. (For example, the in vivo transcriptomics of E. coli during a urinary tract infection.) Accordingly, in vitro includes models that do not involve the entire host.
  - Viruses, which only replicate in living cells, are studied in the laboratory in cell or tissue culture, and many animal virologists refer to such work as being in vitro to distinguish it from in vivo work in whole animals.
- The study of the molecular machineries tends to see the whole cell as the biggest unit. As a result, cell cultures (even mammalian ones) can be considered in vivo instead of the usual assignment as in vitro. In this context, in vitro exclusively refers to cell-free systems.

== Examples ==
As described before, in vitro can encompass work on living and non-living systems of a wide range of complexities.

- Using any part of a living organism
  - Protein purification involves the isolation of a specific protein of interest from a complex mixture of proteins, often obtained from homogenized cells or tissues.
- Using parts derived from multicellular organisms (cell culture, tissue culture, and more)
  - In vitro fertilization is used to allow spermatozoa to fertilize eggs in a culture dish before implanting the resulting embryo or embryos into the uterus of the prospective mother.
  - In vitro diagnostics refers to a wide range of medical and veterinary laboratory tests that are used to diagnose diseases and monitor the clinical status of patients using samples of blood, cells, or other tissues obtained from a patient.
  - In vitro pharmacological testing has been used to characterize specific adsorption, distribution, metabolism, and excretion processes of drugs or general chemicals inside a living organism; for example, Caco-2 cell experiments can be performed to estimate the absorption of compounds through the lining of the gastrointestinal tract; The partitioning of the compounds between organs can be determined to study distribution mechanisms; Suspension or plated cultures of primary hepatocytes or hepatocyte-like cell lines (Hep G2, HepaRG) can be used to study and quantify metabolism of chemicals. These ADME process parameters can then be integrated into so called "physiologically based pharmacokinetic models" or PBPK.
  - Cellular models of neurodegenerative diseases allow different ways to probe the health of the mitochondria in the cell.
- Using cellular or subcellular extracts (e.g. wheat germ or reticulocyte extracts)
  - Wheat germ extract contains functional ribosomes. It can be used to translate mRNA outside of a cell.
- Using purified membrane-bounded organelles
  - Mitochondria and chloroplasts can be isolated from cells while preserving their function.
- Using purified macromolecular complexes (such as ribosomes)
  - Functional ribosomes have been assembled in vitro.
- Using purified molecules (such as proteins, DNA, or RNA)
  - Polymerase chain reaction is a method for selective replication of specific DNA and RNA sequences in the test tube. It uses pure isolated enzymes.
  - The action of DNA replication has been analyzed in vitro on a single-molecule basis.

== Advantages ==
In vitro studies allow a species-specific, simpler, and more detailed analysis than can be done with the whole organism.

=== Simplicity ===
Living organisms are extremely complex functional systems that are made up of, at a minimum, many tens of thousands of genes, protein molecules, RNA molecules, small organic compounds, inorganic ions, and complexes in an environment that is spatially organized by membranes, and in the case of multicellular organisms, organ systems. These myriad components interact with each other and with their environment in a way that processes food, removes waste, moves components to the correct location, and is responsive to signalling molecules, other organisms, light, sound, heat, taste, touch, and balance.

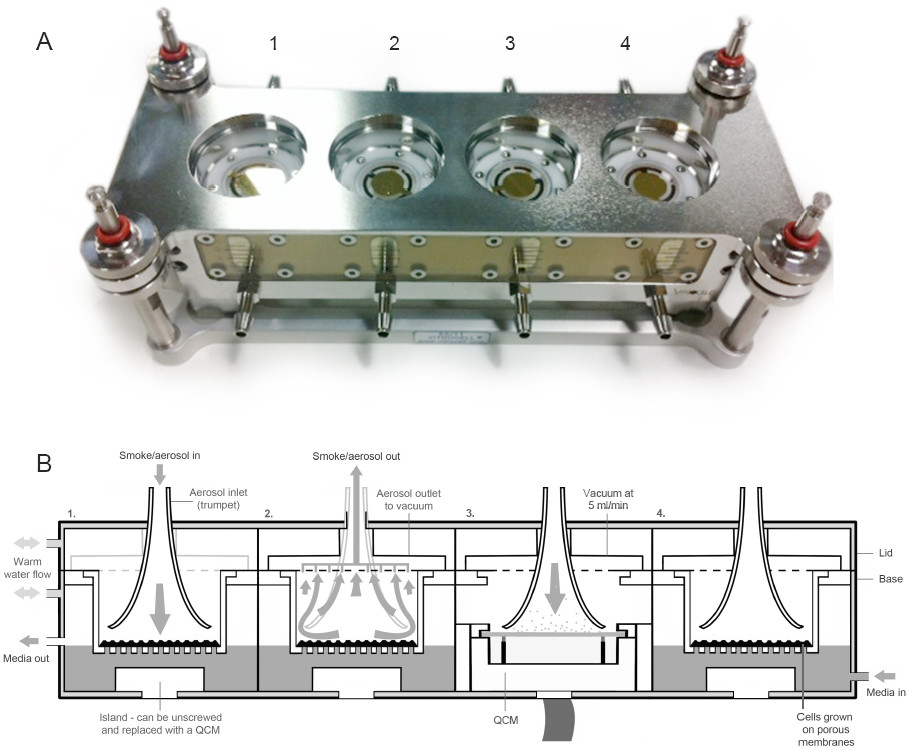
Top view of a Vitrocell mammalian exposure module "smoking robot", (lid removed) view of four separated wells for cell culture inserts to be exposed to tobacco smoke or an aerosol for an in vitro study of the effects

This complexity makes it difficult to identify the interactions between individual components and to explore their basic biological functions. In vitro work simplifies the system under study, so the investigator can focus on a small number of components.

For example, the identity of proteins of the immune system (e.g. antibodies), and the mechanism by which they recognize and bind to foreign antigens would remain very obscure if not for the extensive use of in vitro work to isolate the proteins, identify the cells and genes that produce them, study the physical properties of their interaction with antigens, and identify how those interactions lead to cellular signals that activate other components of the immune system.

=== Species specificity ===
Another advantage of in vitro methods is that human cells can be studied without "extrapolation" from an experimental animal's cellular response.

=== Convenience, automation ===
In vitro methods can be miniaturized and automated, yielding high-throughput screening methods for testing molecules in pharmacology or toxicology.

In toxicology, U.S. agencies such as the EPA use high-throughput in vitro screening to test large numbers of chemicals and reduce the need for animal-based toxicity tests.

== Disadvantages ==
The primary disadvantage of in vitro experimental studies is that it may be challenging to extrapolate from the results of in vitro work back to the biology of the intact organism. Investigators doing in vitro work must be careful to avoid over-interpretation of their results, which can lead to erroneous conclusions about organismal and systems biology.

For example, scientists developing a new viral drug to treat an infection with a pathogenic virus (e.g., HIV-1) may find that a candidate drug functions to prevent viral replication in an in vitro setting (typically cell culture). However, before this drug is used in the clinic, it must progress through a series of in vivo trials to determine if it is safe and effective in intact organisms (typically small animals, primates, and humans in succession). Typically, most candidate drugs that are effective in vitro prove to be ineffective in vivo because of issues associated with delivery of the drug to the affected tissues, toxicity towards essential parts of the organism that were not represented in the initial in vitro studies, or other issues.

== In vitro test batteries ==
A method which could help decrease animal testing is the use of in vitro batteries, where several in vitro assays are compiled to cover multiple endpoints. Within developmental neurotoxicity and reproductive toxicity there are hopes for test batteries to become easy screening methods for prioritization for which chemicals to be risk assessed and in which order. Within ecotoxicology in vitro test batteries are already in use for regulatory purpose and for toxicological evaluation of chemicals. In vitro tests can also be combined with in vivo testing to make a in vitro in vivo test battery, for example for pharmaceutical testing.

== In vitro to in vivo extrapolation ==
Results obtained from in vitro experiments cannot usually be transposed, as is, to predict the reaction of an entire organism in vivo. Building a consistent and reliable extrapolation procedure from in vitro results to in vivo is therefore extremely important. Solutions include:

- Increasing the complexity of in vitro systems to reproduce tissues and interactions between them (as in "human on chip" systems)
- Using mathematical modeling to numerically simulate the behavior of the complex system, where the in vitro data provide model parameter values

These two approaches are not incompatible; better in vitro systems provide better data to mathematical models. However, increasingly sophisticated in vitro experiments collect increasingly numerous, complex, and challenging data to integrate. Mathematical models, such as systems biology models, are much needed here.

=== Extrapolating in pharmacology ===
In pharmacology, IVIVE can be used to approximate pharmacokinetics (PK) or pharmacodynamics (PD). Since the timing and intensity of effects on a given target depend on the concentration time course of candidate drug (parent molecule or metabolites) at that target site, in vivo tissue and organ sensitivities can be completely different or even inverse of those observed on cells cultured and exposed in vitro. That indicates that extrapolating effects observed in vitro needs a quantitative model of in vivo PK. Physiologically based PK (PBPK) models are generally accepted to be central to the extrapolations.

In the case of early effects or those without intercellular communications, the same cellular exposure concentration is assumed to cause the same effects, both qualitatively and quantitatively, in vitro and in vivo. In these conditions, developing a simple PD model of the dose–response relationship observed in vitro, and transposing it without changes to predict in vivo effects is not enough.

== See also ==
- In vitro fertilisation (IVF)
- Animal testing
- Ex vivo
- In situ
- In utero
- In vivo
- In silico
- In papyro
- In natura
- Animal in vitro cellular and developmental biology
- Plant in vitro cellular and developmental biology
- In vitro toxicology
- In vitro to in vivo extrapolation
- Slice preparation
