= Back injury =

Damage or wear to bones, muscles or other tissues of the back

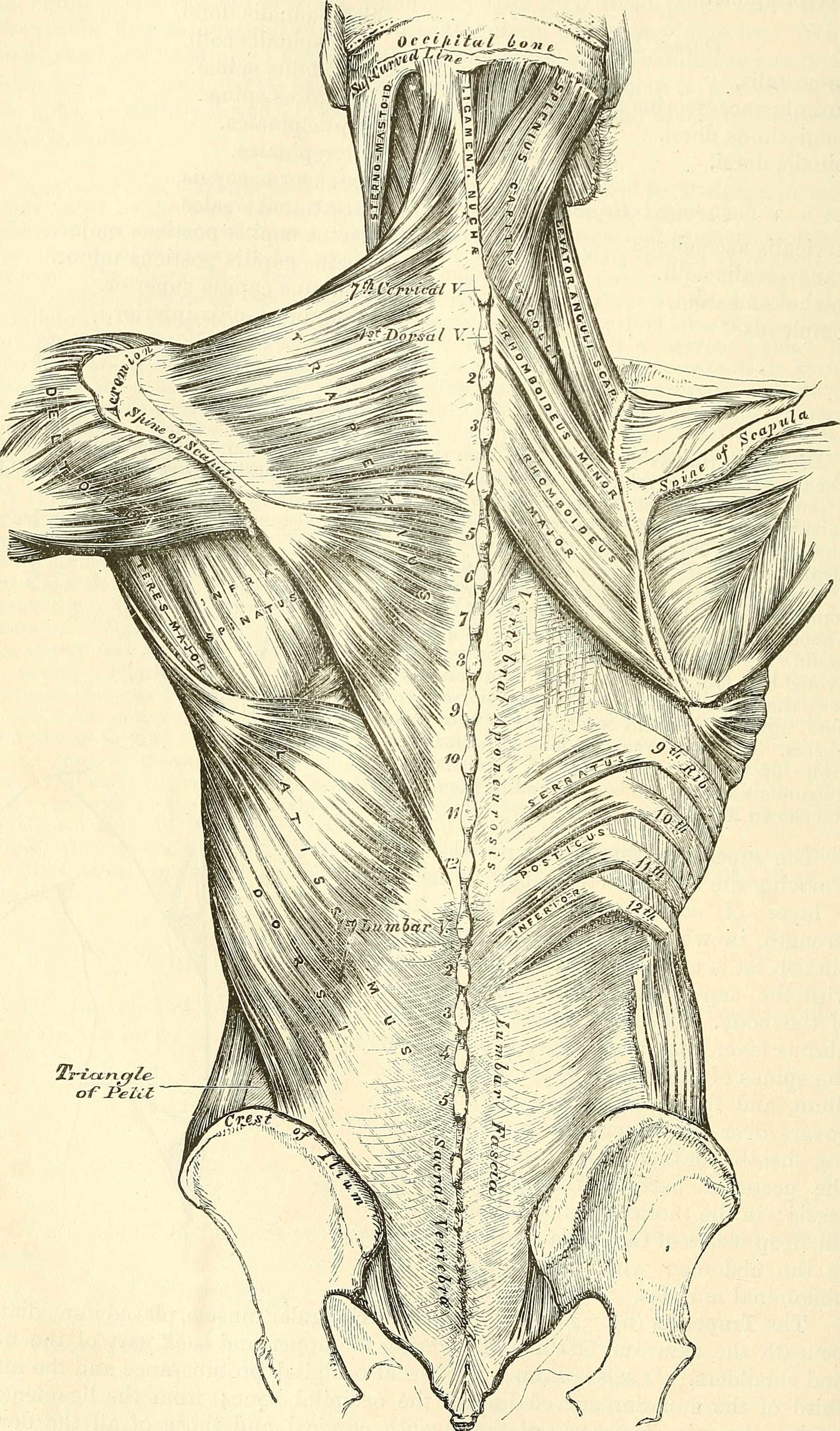
Human anatomy of the back

Back injuries result from damage, wear, or trauma to the bones, muscles, or other tissues of the back. Common back injuries include sprains and strains, herniated discs, and fractured vertebrae. The lumbar spine is often the site of back pain. The area is susceptible because of its flexibility and the amount of body weight it regularly bears. It is estimated that low-back pain may affect as much as 80 to 90 percent of the general population in the United States.

== Classification ==
=== Soft tissue graded system ===
Muscle and soft tissue injuries can be classified using a graded system.

- Grade 1 muscle strain is the least severe with damage to few muscle fibers and little if any loss of function.
- Grade 2 muscle strain indicates a mild to moderate injury with appreciable tissue damage and some loss of function or strength.
- Grade 3 muscle strain is the most severe injury grade with the muscle being either completely torn or experiencing complete loss of function.

=== AO spine injury classification system ===
Spinal column or vertebral injuries can be classified using the AO spine injury classification system. The three categories - A, B, and C - are based on the location of damage on the vertebra (either on the anterior or posterior segment) and by the direction of the applied injurious force.

- Type A injuries are those associated with a compression force with damage to the vertebral bodies.
- Type B injuries are those associated with a distraction force resulting in structural damage to the posterior components of the vertebral column.
- Type C injuries are those associated with damage to both anterior and posterior aspects of the vertebral column resulting in displacement of the disconnected segments in any direction.

This classification system can be used to classify injury to the cervical, thoracolumbar, and sacral regions of the spinal column.

=== MSU classification for herniated discs ===
Herniated discs can be graded based on the size and location of the herniation as seen on an MRI.

==== Size ====
The size of the herniation is the extent to which it protrudes into the vertebral foramen. The MSU Classification for herniated discs uses the proximity of the disc to the facet joint when measuring the size of a herniated disc. Using the MSU Classification, a grade of 1, 2 or 3 can be used to describe the size of a herniated disc with 1 being the least severe and 3 being the most severe.

==== Location ====
The location of the herniation can also be described using the MSU Classification for herniated discs. This classification describes how far away from mid-line a disc protrusion is using a grade of A, B, or C.

- Grade A describes a herniation at midline.
- Grade C herniations are the most lateral and protrude into the intervertebral foramen (through which spinal nerves travel).
- Grade B herniated discs are those located between grade A and C, using the facet joint as the landmark for the lateral border.

MSU Classification is primarily used for classifying herniated discs in the lumbar spine.

== Causes ==
Many back injuries share similar causes. Strains and sprains to the back muscles can be caused by improper movements while lifting heavy loads, overuse of a muscle, sudden forceful movements, or direct trauma. Herniated discs are associated with age-related degeneration, trauma such as a fall or car accident, and bending or twisting while lifting heavy weights. Common causes of vertebral fractures include trauma from a direct blow, a compression force resulting in improper or excessive axial loading, and hyper-flexion or hyper-extension.

Vertebral fractures in children or elderly individuals can be related to the development or health of their spine. The most common vertebral fracture in children is spondylolysis which can progress to spondylolisthesis. The immature skeleton contains growth plates which have not yet completely ossified into stronger mature bone. Vertebral fractures in elderly individuals are exacerbated by weakening of the skeleton associated with osteoporosis.

== Diagnosis ==
Diagnosis of a back injury begins with a physical examination and thorough medical history by health-care personnel. Some injuries, such as sprains and strains or herniated discs, can be diagnosed in this manner. To confirm these diagnoses, or to rule out other injuries or pathology, imaging of the injured region can be ordered. X-rays are often used to visualize pathology of bones and can be ordered when a vertebral fracture is suspected. CT scans produce higher resolution images when compared to x-rays and can be used to view more subtle fractures which may otherwise go undetected on x-ray. MRI is commonly referred to as the gold standard for visualizing soft tissue and can be used to assist with diagnosing many back injuries, including herniated discs and neurological disorders, bleeding, and edema.

== Prevention ==
Suggestions for preventing various back injuries primarily address the causes of those injuries. The risk for back sprains and strains may be reduced with lifestyle choices, including smoking cessation, limiting alcohol, maintaining a healthy weight, and keeping bones and muscles strong with adequate exercise and a healthy diet. The risk for disc herniations can be reduced by using proper techniques when lifting heavy loads, smoking cessation, and weight loss to reduce the load placed on the spine. Vertebral fractures may be difficult to prevent since common causes are related to accidents or age-related degeneration associated with osteoporosis. Treating osteoporosis with pharmacotherapy, enrolling in a fall prevention program, strengthening muscles and bones with a weight-bearing exercise program, and adopting a nutritional program that promotes bone health are all options to reduce the risk of vertebral fractures associated with osteoporosis.

== Treatment ==
Treatment for back injuries depends on the diagnosis, level of pain, and whether there is loss of function or quality of life.

=== Conservative ===
- Cold therapy reduces inflammation, edema, pain, and muscle spasms associated with acute back injury.
- Heat therapy is used to reduce pain and alleviate sore and stiff muscles. Heat therapy is proposed to work by facilitating delivery of nutrients and oxygen to the site of injury to accommodate healing.
- Medication: Non-steroidal anti-inflammatory drugs (NSAIDs) or acetaminophen can be taken to reduce mild to moderate pain associated with back injuries. NSAIDs are suggested to be more effective for persistent pain than for acute pain. If pain remains intolerable while taking over the counter medications, a stronger pain medication such as a narcotic or a muscle relaxant can be prescribed at a physician's discretion.
- Therapy and alternative medicine: an active approach to recovery is recommended over bed rest for most cases of back injury. Activity promotes strength and functional rehabilitation and counters atrophy associated with disuse. Physical therapy can help reduce pain and regain strength and function. The gentle movement of yoga and tai chi are suggested to improve function and to counter the negative psychosocial effects that can be secondary to injury. Spinal manipulation, massage, and acupuncture have been used to treat the pain associated with various back injuries, but there is little consensus on their degree of effectiveness.
- Injections: Spinal nerve blocks and epidural injections are options available to alleviate pain and neurological symptoms. Injections of anesthetics alleviate pain while steroid injections can be used to reduce the inflammation and swelling surrounding spinal nerves.

=== Non-Conservative ===
Surgery is considered when symptoms persist after attempting conservative treatment. It is estimated 10-20 percent of individuals with low back pain fail to improve with conservative measures.

- A discectomy is a common procedure used to alleviate the radiating pain and neurological symptoms associated with a herniated disc. There are multiple variations of a discectomy with differing approaches to access the herniated disc, but the goal of the procedure is to remove the portion of the intervertebral disc that is protruding into the vertebral foramen.
- A total disc replacement can also be performed to address a herniated disc. Rather than removing only the portion of the disc that has prolapsed as in a discectomy, this procedure involves removing the entire vertebral disc and replacing it with an artificial one.
- Surgical remedies for vertebral fractures are found to be more effective than conservative treatment. Vertebroplasty and kyphoplasty are considered minimally invasive surgical procedures and are proposed to relieve pain and restore function of fractured vertebrae.

== Epidemiology ==
- The two age groups with the highest rate of vertebral column injuries are ages 15–29 and 65 and older.
- An estimated 50 percent of spinal injuries are attributed to motor vehicle accidents.
- Although the majority of vertebral fractures go undiagnosed, the annual cost related to treatment of vertebral fractures is estimated to be $1 billion in the U.S.
- Symptomatic disc herniations are most common between ages 30–50 years. 95 percent of herniated discs diagnosed in patients 25–55 years are located in the lumbar spine.
- By age 15 an estimated 26-50 percent of children have experienced acute or chronic back pain.
