= Heraeus =

German technology group

- Type: Private
- Industry: Technology
- Founded: 1851
- Founder: Wilhelm Carl Heraeus
- Headquarters: Hanau, Germany
- Key people: Frank Stietz, CEO; Rolf Wetzel, Member of the Board; Franz Haniel, Chairman of the Supervisory Board
- Revenue: €43.2 billion (2025)
- Number of employees: 15.115 (2025)
- Website: heraeus.com

Heraeus is a German technology group with a focus on precious and special metals, medical technology, quartz glass and sensors as well as electronic components. Founded in Hanau in 1851, the company is one of the largest family-owned companies in Germany in terms of revenue. Heraeus employs 15,100 people in 40 countries and generated a total revenue of €25.6 billion in 2023. The headquarters and head office are in Hanau, Germany.

== History ==
=== 1660: Pharmacy as the origin of the group ===
The origins of the Heraeus family business go back to the 17th century. In October 1660, Isaac Heraeus (1636-1676) took over what was then the Faucque pharmacy in Hanau-Neustadt, east of Frankfurt. In 1668, he opened his own pharmacy on the market square in Hanau-Neustadt under the name "Zum weißen Einhorn", which later became the Einhorn Pharmacy. The Einhorn Pharmacy was run as a count's court pharmacy for a total of six generations until the middle of the 19th century.

=== 1851 – 1888: Founding of the platinum smelter ===
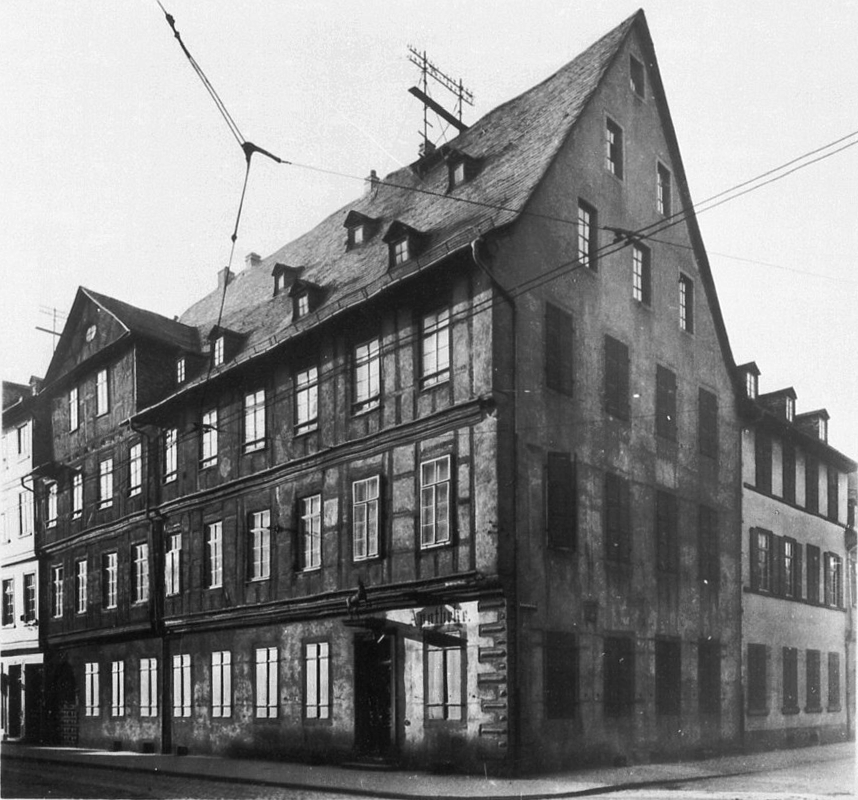
The Einhorn Pharmacy in Hanau

Since the end of the 18th century, Hanau was a town of goldsmiths and platinum had been processed in the town for the production of jewelry. Goldsmiths had extreme difficulty processing platinum due to its toughness and high melting point of 1770 degrees Celsius. Until a melting process was discovered, platinum could only be processed by using complex forging processes using the white-hot metal. In 1851, at the age of 24, the pharmacist and chemist Wilhelm Carl Heraeus took over the Einhorn Pharmacy from his father Esay Heraeus (1785-1830).

Heraeus understood the problems faced by goldsmiths. After a series of experiments, he first succeeded in melting platinum in large volumes and producing pure metal in 1856, using an oxyhydrogen blowpipe he developed himself. Although the process was already known, this had previously only succeeded in small quantities in the laboratory. With his gas blowpipe, Heraeus could produce enough oxyhydrogen and a large enough flame front to melt several kilograms of platinum-containing materials.

This enabled Heraeus to found the W.C. Heraeus First German Platinum Smelters, supplying a variety of customers such as goldsmith workshops and jewelry factories internationally, as well as dental manufacturers, chemistry laboratories and other branches of industry. In 1857, W.C. Heraeus succeeded in producing around 30 kilograms of pure platinum. Between 1875 and 1879, up to 400 kilograms were sold per year, and in 1888, over 900 kilograms.

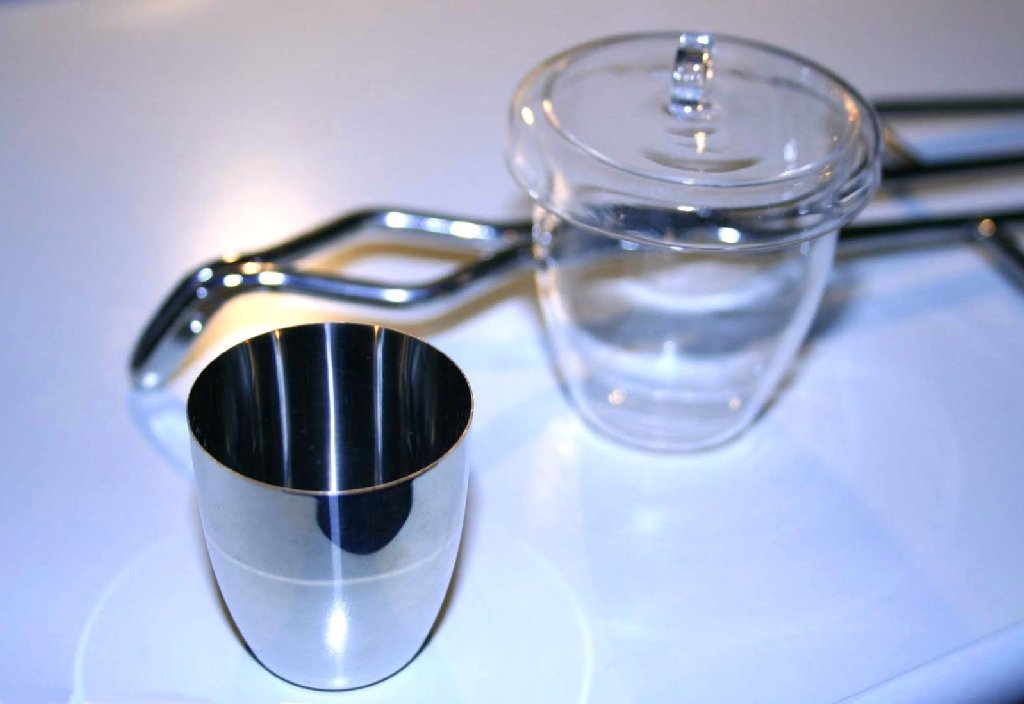
Crucibles made of platinum and quartz

=== 1889 – 1926: Inventions and patents ===
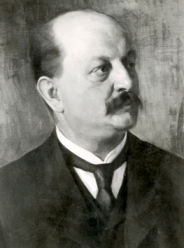
Richard Küch

In 1889, the two sons of the company founder, Wilhelm and Heinrich Heraeus, took over the management. Research and development was further pursued, and the physicist and chemist Richard Küch, a former school friend of the Heraeus brothers, joined the company in 1890. Küch's research resulted in the German Imperial Patent No. 63591 in 1891 for the gilding of platinum sheet, the first patent in the company's history. Küch then developed a process by which quartz glass could be obtained by melting rock crystal at around 2000 °C.

The quartz glass produced by the company was almost entirely free of defects and was of outstanding purity. It is still used in medicine and is a highly sought-after material in manufacturing on account of its translucence and resistance to heat and acids. With the advent of ceramic colors, more platinum was needed for production processes, and Heraeus started supplying products to the electrochemical and plastics industries. As the company continued to expand, it needed new premises – so in 1896, the W.C. Heraeus Platinum Smelting Factory was established just outside Hanau, employing 40 people.

Further experimentation in the platinum smelters’ laboratories resulted in a variety of inventions and new production processes. These included the production of pharmaceutical iron compounds, chemically pure hydrofluoric acid, rubidium, and caesium. Most production at this time still involved platinum, which was used in more applications due to its chemical and physical properties. As it is also highly resistant to acids and heat, platinum was also used to make instruments such as scientific tools, crucibles, and vessels used in chemistry and physics.

As early as the 19th century, platinum had already been used in locking pins to hold false teeth in place. Platinum was also used to make filaments in light bulbs and non-corrosive electrical contacts in telephones. With the development of the tanning lamp in 1904, Küch and Heraeus are regarded as the inventors of the UV high-pressure lamp and pioneers of body irradiation with artificial light sources for medical light therapy. In 1906, Küch developed the standardized resistance thermometer made of platinum, the principle of which is still used today in cars and ovens.

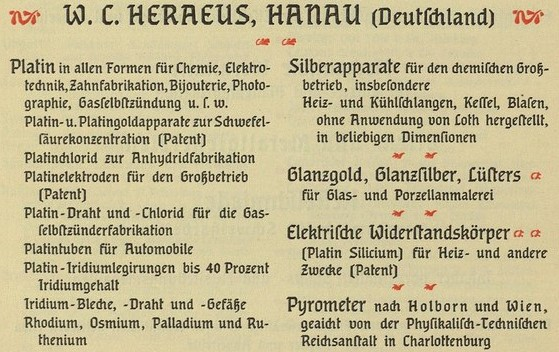
Exposition Universelle (1900)

In 1902, Charles Engelhard (1867-1950), brother-in-law of the two Heraeus brothers, became representative of the group in the USA and founded the Engelhard Corporation, a company for refining platinum, gold and silver. In 1909, Heraeus was transformed from a general partnership into W. C. Heraeus GmbH. Richard Küch became a co-partner and one of three managing directors.

One of the most significant technical innovations in metal processing is credited to Heraeus: the melting of metals under vacuum. Heraeus applied for a patent on this process on 12 January 1918 and was granted a German patent DE 345161. Heraeus was subsequently granted British patent GB 138648, Swiss patent CH 89145, and several French patents on the process. For a short time, Heraeus set up an independent division dedicated to this technology, Heraeus Vacuumschmelze, which registered 84 German patents in 10 years.

=== 1927 – 1945: Further development and setbacks ===
Due to the First World War, hyperinflation in the Weimar Republic and the collapse of the precious metal market in Russia, prices for platinum were subject to extreme fluctuations. Heraeus therefore focused its research activities on recycling techniques, and at the same time tried to find suitable materials to replace the precious metals. At this time, Wilhelm Heinrich Heraeus and his cousin Reinhard Heraeus took over the management of the company in the third generation for almost 40 years from 1927. In this era, new physical findings were implemented by Heraeus – for example in the production of the first dental alloys. Despite the turbulent times, the business continued to grow. By 1939 it employed around 1,000 people, with annual sales of around 20 million ℛ︁ℳ︁.

With the outbreak of the Second World War, numerous workers were drafted into military service. The company employed 1,500 forced laborers from the Hanau civilian labor camp. Production shifted to electrical contacts with low densities of precious metals, catalysts, and rhodium reflectors for armament-related goods such as catalytic converters for anti-aircraft searchlights. During air raids in 1944 and 1945, the company's facilities in Hanau were almost completely destroyed. Heraeus had the company's role in the Third Reich investigated in an independent scientific study at the end of the 1990s and joined the fund of the German business Foundation Remembrance, Responsibility and Future for the compensation of forced laborers.

=== 1945 – 1983: Internationalization after reconstruction ===
During German reconstruction, the company turned its attention back to its established products and expanding new production facilities. The company re-established its network of contacts after the Second World War, allowing it to gain new customers in the American market for quartz glass for optical applications.

Beginning in 1958, the company founded its first sales subsidiaries in France and Italy, followed by full subsidiaries and international holdings as of 1972. The company subsequently set up new quartz glass factories in Japan and the United States, followed by manufacturing facilities in South Korea and the Philippines to produce contact wires (wire bonding) made of pure gold for use in semiconductor components. In 1970, Helmut Gruber, a physicist in the field of metallurgy, took over the management of the company, as well as the responsibility for the technology department across the group. He promoted activities in the field of quartz glass, precious metal chemistry and special metals as well as the establishment of subsidiaries abroad.

Fun facts: Heraeus supplied the space-stable quartz glass for the still functional laser reflector for the exact determination of the distance between Earth and the Moon, which the Apollo 11 mission left behind on the lunar surface.

=== 1983 – 2000: Founding of the holding company ===
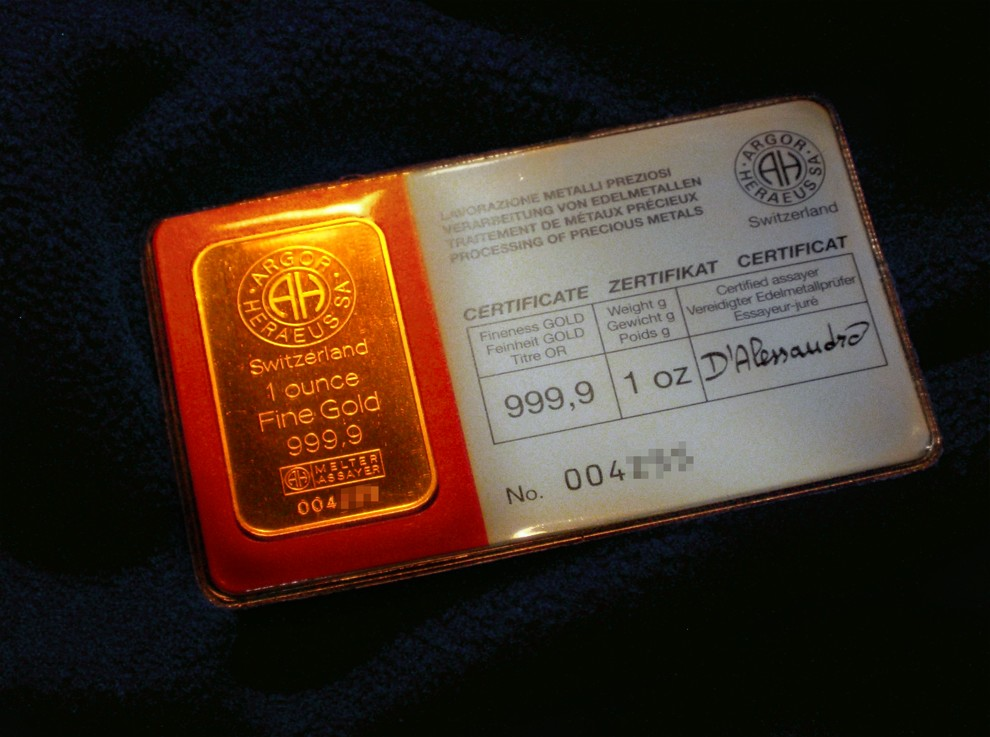
A troy ounce of gold with a Heraeus imprint

From 1983 until 2000, Jürgen Heraeus, son of Reinhard Heraeus who was a member of the Board of Management since 1970, headed the company in the fourth generation. Under his management, the business grew into a global group of companies. For this, a far-reaching reorganization of the company took place, as well as new management structures introduced. Following the founding of Heraeus Holding GmbH in 1985, the company underwent a comprehensive decentralization in 1990. Under the umbrella of the management holding, the group's core activities of precious metals, dental materials, quartz glass, sensors and medical technology were reorganized into five decentralized, independent management divisions.

In 1991, a hydrogen tank exploded at the quartz glass site in Hanau, destroying large parts of the factory premises. In the same year, the company established a factory for the production of synthetic quartz glass for the manufacture of optical fibers in the chemical park in Bitterfeld-Wolfen (Saxony-Anhalt) after German reunification. Simultaneously, the company expanded internationally, especially in Asia. As the company grew, sales and operating profits reflected its standing as an international group.

=== 2001 – 2019: Growth and restructuring ===
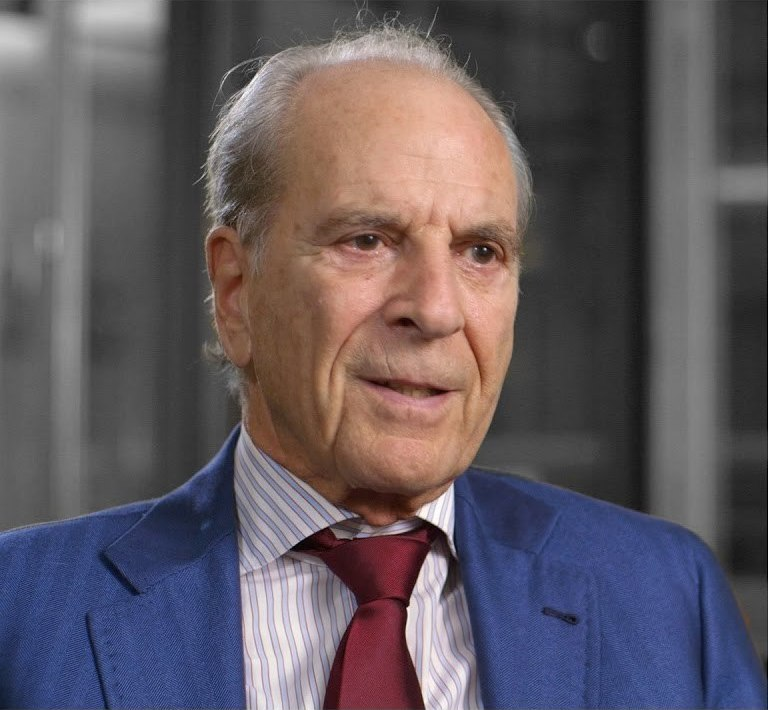
Jürgen Heraeus, 2017

At the beginning of 2000, Jürgen Heraeus took over as Chairman of the Supervisory Board of the family-owned company. For the first time, the management board did not include a family member.

To exploit synergies throughout the group, Heraeus refocused its activities on core business, leading to further restructuring. The Heraeus Med part of the company was sold in 2002, as were the group's shares in Kendro Laboratory Products. At the same time, Heraeus intensified its involvement in industrial precious metals by expanding its activities in the field of thin film materials.

In 2009, the W.C. Heraeus business segment was split into the new Heraeus Precious Metals and Heraeus Materials Technology business units, marking the first major restructuring. In 2013, Heraeus Dental was sold to the Mitsui Group, a Japanese company. The same year, Jan Rinnert, Jürgen Heraeus' son-in-law, took over the company's management. He oversaw another major corporate restructuring in 2015. The existing structure of a holding company overseeing six business units was transformed into a holding company overseeing eleven so-called Global Business Units (GBUs). For this purpose, Heraeus Precious Metals and Heraeus Materials Technology, two of the six existing business units, were dissolved and reorganized into seven GBUs.

In October 2018, Heraeus extended its sales channels in Germany by opening the online platform Heraeus-Gold.de in co-operation with the precious metals trader Ophirum GmbH. The platform allows retail customers to buy Heraeus precious metal bars and a variety of popular coins.

=== Since 2020: Acquisitions, sales and investments ===
In 2021, Heraeus acquired the US company Norwood Medical, a manufacturer of medical instruments, devices, and components with more than 1100 employees. The acquisition is considered one of the largest in the company's history. This was followed in 2022 by the acquisition of PET recycling company Perpetual Technologies, which was renamed Revalyu Resources at the same time. Also in 2022, Heraeus founded a joint venture with BASF, with equal shares, to recover precious metals from spent automotive catalysts. The new company, BASF Heraeus Metal Resource, produces recycled precious metals for high-tech industries in China.

In April 2023, Heraeus sold its platinum temperature sensor business (Heraeus Nexensos) to Yageo, an electronic components company. In June 2023, the business portfolio was restructured and the previous division into Global Business Units and Start-ups was replaced by the designation Operating Companies.

At the end of 2023, Heraeus sold its specialty lighting business Heraeus Noblelight to the US-based Excelitas Technologies Corp., based in Waltham, Massachusetts.

In June 2024, Heraeus acquired 100% of McCol Metals, a Canadian company specializing in the recovery of iridium from spent mixed metal oxide electrodes.

In 2025, the Chinese Haitian Group acquired Heraeus Photovoltaics (Shanghai), Heraeus Photovoltaic Technology (Shanghai), and Heraeus Photovoltaics Singapore, thereby acquiring the business of photovoltaic silver pastes for approximately 66 million euros.

In May 2025, a leadership change occurred at Heraeus: the previous operational managing director Frank Stietz became the new chairman of the management board. He succeeds Jan Rinnert, who led the family business for twelve years.

In September 2026, the sale of the rare-earth magnet recycler Remloy from Heraeus to the Canadian resource developer Mkango Resources was completed.

== Specialty Products ==
Heraeus products are used in metal, electronics, chemistry, automotive, telecommunications or medicine. The group supplies products to manufacturing companies in the automotive industry, the aerospace sector, telecommunications, the chemical industry, medical technology and the steel industry.

A main business unit of the Heraeus Group is the production and processing of precious metals (e.g. platinum, gold, silver). The metals are processed, among other things, into wires or substrates for components in the automotive or electrical industries, or used in sensors that measure, for example, the sulfur content or temperature in the production of steel. Another component of the group is quartz glass used in processing for the semiconductor industry, as well as in special preforms for the production of glass fibers.

Heraeus produces special light sources in the UV and infrared range; both for industrial use, such as for hardening printing inks and plastics, and for disinfecting drinking water. In the medical sector, Heraeus produces components such as bone cement and coatings for implants, as well as high potency active pharmaceutical ingredient.

== Corporate structure ==
Under the umbrella of Heraeus Holding, the Heraeus Group operates as an international conglomerate of more than 100 individual companies in 40 countries. The headquarters and head office are in Hanau, Hesse. The group's four fields of activity are as follows: Metals and Recycling, Healthcare, Semiconductor and Electronics as well as Industrials. The various business activities are divided into 12 operating units, which Heraeus has been calling Operating Companies since 2023. The operational units are complemented by three start-ups.

The Heraeus Holding is wholly owned directly and indirectly by the founding family, with around 200 family shareholders. Jürgen Heraeus and his siblings hold 25 percent of the shares.

=== Operating companies of the Heraeus Group ===
Metals and Recycling

- Heraeus Precious Metals: trading, production and recycling of precious metals; manufacture of products for industry (e.g., catalysts for the production of plastics or hydrogen, coatings for PC hard disks, wires for microchips and pacemakers, etc.),
- Argor-Heraeus: Argor‑Heraeus is operating as an independent company within the Heraeus Group, following the organisational development of Heraeus Precious Metals into two distinct operating entities effective July 1, 2026.

Healthcare

- Heraeus Medical: bone cement and coatings for medical implants in surgical orthopedics,
- Heraeus Medevio (formerly Heraeus Medical Components): Components for the medical technology industry, e.g., pacemaker components and components for the treatment of vascular diseases,
- Norwood Medical: development and production of instruments, tools, and components in medicine,
- Mo-Sci: development and manufacturing of precision glass technology, e.g., glass microspheres, powders, ingots, and specialty glasses,
- Engineered Tissue Solutions: development of medical wound care products composed of proprietary borate-based bioactive glass.

Semiconductor and Electronics

- Heraeus Electronics: production of miniature electronic components and assembly materials for the electrical and automotive industries (e.g., bonding wires, thick-film pastes, and conductive polymers),
- Heraeus Epurio: capacitors, displays, photoresists (photoresist), and conductive polymers for the semiconductor industry,
- Heraeus Covantics: production and processing of high-purity quartz glass and ceramics and novel composites; production of synthetic quartz glass and ceramic materials for the data transmission and telecommunications industry, production of specialty fibers for industrial and medical applications, semiconductor manufacturing and optics,
- Heraeus Printed Electronics: digital printing process for metallic conductive systems.

Industrials

- Heraeus Electro-Nite: measurement technology such as (disposable) sensors and samplers specifically for molten metals, as well as hardware and software for systems engineering,

Start-ups

- Heraeus Amloy: development and production of amorphous alloys and components,
- Revalyu Resources: PET recycling company (majority shareholding).
- Smart Steel Technologies: AI-based software products for the steel manufacturing process (minority shareholding).
