= Osteolysis =

Breaking down of bone by osteoclasts

- Specialty: Orthopedics

Osteolysis is an active resorption of bone matrix by osteoclasts and can be interpreted as the reverse of ossification. Although osteoclasts are active during the natural formation of healthy bone the term "osteolysis" specifically refers to a pathological process. Osteolysis often occurs in the proximity of a prosthesis that causes either an immunological response or changes in the bone's structural load. Osteolysis may also be caused by pathologies like bone tumors, cysts, or chronic inflammation.

== Joint replacement ==
While bone resorption is commonly associated with many diseases or joint problems, the term osteolysis generally refers to a problem common to artificial joint replacements such as total hip replacements, total knee replacements and total shoulder replacements. Osteolysis can also be associated with the radiographic changes seen in those with bisphosphonate-related osteonecrosis of the jaw.

There are several biological mechanisms which may lead to osteolysis. In total hip replacement, the generally accepted explanation for osteolysis involves wear particles (worn off the contact surface of the artificial ball and socket joint). As the body attempts to clean up these wear particles (typically consisting of plastic or metal), it triggers an autoimmune reaction which causes resorption of living bone tissue. Osteolysis has been reported to occur as early as 12 months after implantation and is usually progressive. This may require a revision surgery (replacement of the prosthesis).

Although osteolysis itself is clinically asymptomatic, it can lead to implant loosening or bone breakage, which in turn causes serious medical problems.

== Distal clavicular osteolysis ==
Distal clavicular osteolysis (DCO) is often associated with problems weightlifters have with their acromioclavicular joints due to high mechanical stresses put on the clavicle as it meets with the acromion. This condition is often referred to as "weight lifter's shoulder". Medical ultrasonography readily depicts resorption of the distal clavicle as irregular cortical erosions, whereas the acromion remains intact. Associated findings may include distended joint capsule, soft tissue swelling, and joint instability.

A common surgery to treat recalcitrant DCO is resection of distal clavicle by removing a few millimetres of bone from the very end of the bone.

== See also ==
- Osteolytic lesion
- Biomineralization
