= ANTXR2 =

Protein-coding gene in the species Homo sapiens

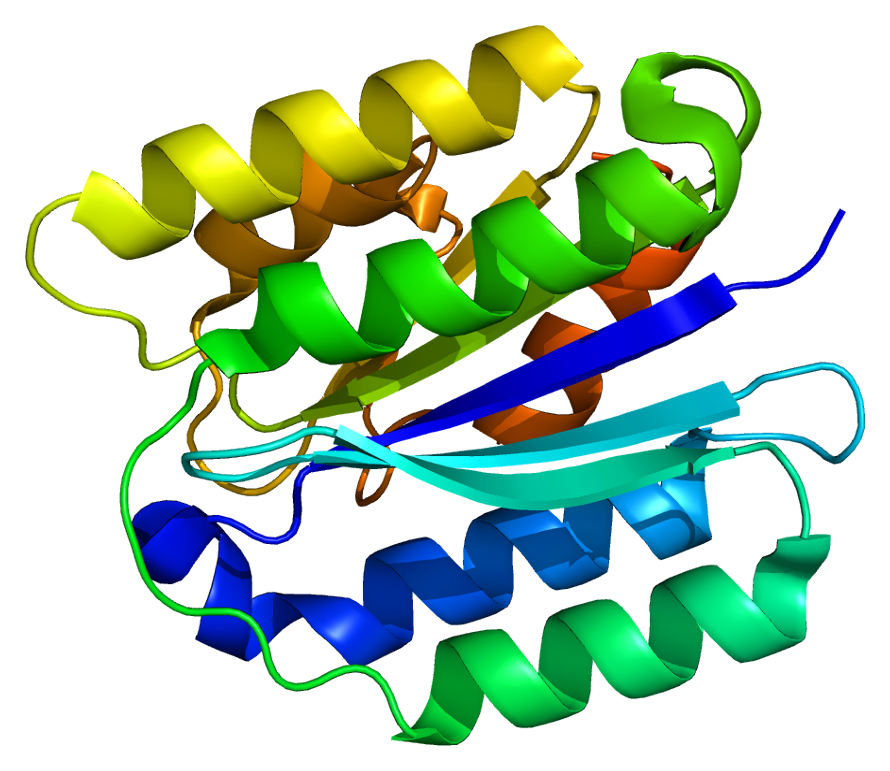

Identifiers
- Aliases: ANTXR2, CMG-2, CMG2, HFS, ISH, JHF, anthrax toxin receptor 2, ANTXR cell adhesion molecule 2
- External IDs: OMIM: 608041; MGI: 1919164; GeneCards: ANTXR2
Available structures
PDB	Ortholog search: PDBe RCSB
PDB	List of PDB id codes 1SHT, 1SHU, 1T6B, 1TZN

Gene location (Human)
Chr.	Chromosome 4 (human)
Band	4q21.21	Start	79,901,146 bp
Band	4q21.21	End	80,125,454 bp

Gene location (Mouse)
Chr.	Chromosome 5 (mouse)
Band	5|5 E3	Start	98,030,642 bp
Band	5|5 E3	End	98,178,902 bp
RNA expression pattern
Bgee	Human / Mouse (ortholog); Top expressed in: gastric mucosa; decidua; smooth muscle tissue; stromal cell of endometrium; tail of epididymis; Achilles tendon; myometrium; body of uterus; gallbladder; muscle layer of sigmoid colon / Top expressed in: decidua; right ventricle; atrium; cardiac muscle tissue of left ventricle; body of femur; calvaria; left lung lobe; uterus; carotid body; interventricular septum; More reference expression data
BioGPS	n/a
Gene ontology
Molecular function	protein binding; metal ion binding; signaling receptor activity; transmembrane signaling receptor activity
Cellular component	integral component of membrane; extracellular region; cell surface; plasma membrane; endosome membrane; endoplasmic reticulum membrane; external side of plasma membrane; endoplasmic reticulum; membrane
Biological process	reproductive process; toxin transport; signal transduction
Sources:Amigo / QuickGO
Orthologs
Databases	NCBI: entry; OMA: entry
Species	Human	Mouse
Entrez	118429	71914
Ensembl	ENSG00000163297	ENSMUSG00000029338
UniProt	P58335	Q6DFX2
RefSeq (mRNA)	NM_001145794; NM_001286780; NM_001286781; NM_058172	NM_133738
RefSeq (protein)	NP_001139266; NP_001273709; NP_001273710; NP_477520; NP_001273710.1	NP_598499
Location (UCSC)	Chr 4: 79.9 – 80.13 Mb	Chr 5: 98.03 – 98.18 Mb
PubMed search
- Wikidata
View/Edit Human	View/Edit Mouse

Anthrax toxin receptor 2 (also known as capillary morphogenesis gene 2 or CMG2) is a protein that in humans is encoded by the ANTXR2 gene.

== Clinical significance ==
Mutations in ANTXR2 are associated with infantile systemic hyalinosis and juvenile systemic hyalinosis, both autosomal recessive disorders. Biallelic missense mutations of ANTXR2 have been described in a case report of atypical infantile systemic hyalinosis with intestinal lymphangiectasia causing protein-losing enteropathy.

== Research ==
Deuquet et al. (2009) found that three out of four missense mutations in the von Willebrand domain of ANTXR2 identified from cases of infantile systemic hyalinosis resulted in partial or complete retention of the protein in the endoplasmic reticulum (ER) of transfected HeLa cells and anthrax toxin receptor–deficient Chinese hamster ovary cells, as did a mutation in the transmembrane domain. They speculate that, for certain mutations, assisting the proper folding and surface expression of ANTXR2 by chemical chaperones may allow for rescue of phenotype, as these proteins appeared to be relatively stable in the ER without rapid degradation by endoplasmic-reticulum-associated protein degradation.

== See also ==
- Anthrax toxin
