= Osteoplasty =

Surgery to modify or repair bone tissue

Osteoplasty is the branch of surgery concerned with bone repair or bone grafting. It is the surgical alteration or reshaping of bone. It may be used to relieve pain associated with metastatic bone disease. Percutaneous osteoplasty involves the use of bone cement to reduce pain and improve mobility. Resection osteoplasty is used in joint-preserving surgery on the hip and thigh bones.

== See also ==
- Osteopathy
- Orthopedics
- Osteoblast
