= In natura =

Describing conditions present in a non-laboratory environment

In natura (Latin for "in Nature") is a phrase to describe conditions present in a non-laboratory environment, to differentiate it from in vivo (experiments on live organisms in a lab) and ex vivo (experiments on cultivated cells isolated from multicellular organisms) conditions.

== See also ==
- In vitro
- In silico
- Ex vivo
- In situ
- In utero
- In papyro
