= ANTXR1 =

Protein found in humans

Identifiers
- Aliases: ANTXR1, ATR, GAPO, TEM8, anthrax toxin receptor 1, ANTXR cell adhesion molecule 1
- External IDs: OMIM: 606410; MGI: 1916788; GeneCards: ANTXR1
Available structures
PDB	Ortholog search: PDBe RCSB
PDB	List of PDB id codes 3N2N

Gene location (Human)
Chr.	Chromosome 2 (human)
Band	2p13.3	Start	69,013,176 bp
Band	2p13.3	End	69,249,327 bp

Gene location (Mouse)
Chr.	Chromosome 6 (mouse)
Band	6|6 D1	Start	87,110,835 bp
Band	6|6 D1	End	87,312,803 bp
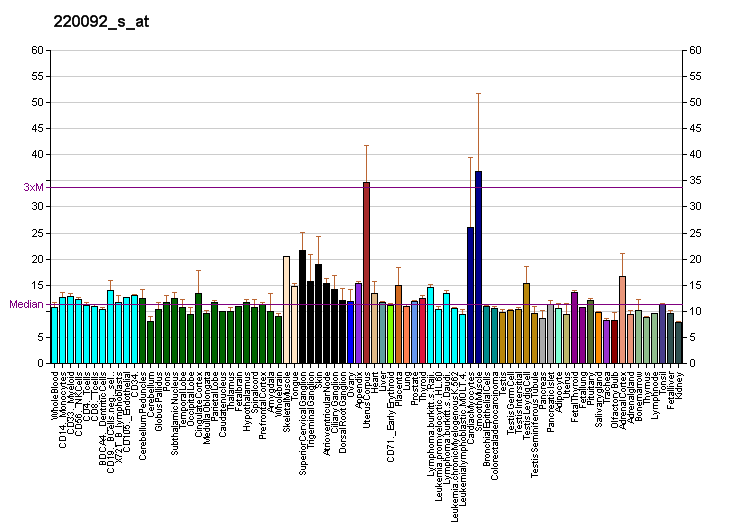
RNA expression pattern
Bgee	Human / Mouse (ortholog); Top expressed in: stromal cell of endometrium; decidua; palpebral conjunctiva; saphenous vein; vena cava; tendon of biceps brachii; right coronary artery; synovial joint; pericardium; urethra / Top expressed in: median eminence; epithelium of lens; body of femur; cornea; gastrula; condyle; molar; umbilical cord; fossa; efferent ductule; More reference expression data
BioGPS	More reference expression data
Gene ontology
Molecular function	actin filament binding; protein binding; collagen binding; transmembrane signaling receptor activity; metal ion binding; signaling receptor activity
Cellular component	integral component of membrane; cell surface; plasma membrane; cell projection; endosome membrane; lamellipodium membrane; extracellular exosome; membrane; filopodium membrane; external side of plasma membrane
Biological process	actin cytoskeleton reorganization; reproductive process; substrate adhesion-dependent cell spreading; signal transduction; positive regulation of metallopeptidase activity; negative regulation of extracellular matrix assembly; blood vessel development; toxin transport
Sources:Amigo / QuickGO
Orthologs
Databases	NCBI: entry; OMA: entry
Species	Human	Mouse
Entrez	84168	69538
Ensembl	ENSG00000169604	ENSMUSG00000033420
UniProt	Q9H6X2; Q96EC6	Q9CZ52
RefSeq (mRNA)	NM_018153; NM_032208; NM_053034	NM_054041
RefSeq (protein)	NP_060623; NP_115584; NP_444262; NP_060623.2	NP_473382
Location (UCSC)	Chr 2: 69.01 – 69.25 Mb	Chr 6: 87.11 – 87.31 Mb
PubMed search
- Wikidata
View/Edit Human	View/Edit Mouse

Anthrax toxin receptor 1 (ANTXR1 or also known asTEM8) is a protein that in humans is encoded by the ANTXR1 gene. Its molecular weight is predicted as about 63kDa.

The protein encoded by this gene is a type I transmembrane protein and is a tumor-specific endothelial marker that has been implicated in colorectal cancer. This protein has been shown to also be a docking protein or receptor for Bacillus anthracis toxin, the causative agent of the disease, anthrax. The binding of the protective antigen (PA) component, of the tripartite anthrax toxin, to this receptor protein mediates delivery of toxin components to the cytosol of cells. Once inside the cell, the other two components of anthrax toxin, edema factor (EF) and lethal factor (LF) disrupt normal cellular processes. Three alternatively spliced variants have been described.

== See also ==
- Anthrax toxin
