= Bone cement =

Adhesives used to repair bone

Bone cement is a synthetic biomaterial used in orthopaedic surgery to anchor implants, fill bone defects, and stabilise fractures by creating a mechanical bond between prosthetic devices and living bone. It has been used for artificial joints (hip joints, knee joints, shoulder and elbow joints) for more than half a century. Artificial joints (referred to as prostheses) are anchored with bone cement. The bone cement fills the free space between the prosthesis and the bone and plays the important role of an elastic zone. This is necessary because the human hip is acted on by approximately 10–12 times the body weight and therefore the bone cement must absorb the forces acting on the hips to ensure that the artificial implant remains in place over the long term.

Bone cement chemically is nothing more than Plexiglas (i.e. polymethyl methacrylate or PMMA). PMMA was used clinically for the first time in the 1940s in plastic surgery to close gaps in the skull. Comprehensive clinical tests of the compatibility of bone cements with the body were conducted before their use in surgery. The excellent tissue compatibility of PMMA allowed bone cements to be used for anchorage of head prostheses in the 1950s.

Today several million procedures of this type are conducted every year all over the world and more than half of them routinely use bone cements – and the proportion is increasing. Bone cement is considered a reliable anchorage material with its ease of use in clinical practice and particularly because of its proven long survival rate with cemented-in prostheses. Hip and knee registers for artificial joint replacements such as those in Sweden and Norway clearly demonstrate the advantages of cemented-in anchorage. A similar register for endoprosthesis was introduced in Germany in 2010.

IUPAC definition

Synthetic, self-curing organic or inorganic material used to fill up a cavity or to create a mechanical fixation.

== Composition ==
Bone cements are provided as two-component materials. Bone cements consist of a powder (i.e., pre-polymerized PMMA and or PMMA or MMA co-polymer beads and or amorphous powder, radio-opacifier, initiator) and a liquid (MMA monomer, stabilizer, inhibitor). The two components are mixed and a free radical polymerization occurs of the monomer when the initiator is mixed with the accelerator. The bone cement viscosity changes over time from a runny liquid into a dough-like state that can be safely applied and then finally hardens into solid hardened material. The set time can be tailored to help the physician safely apply the bone cement into the bone bed to either anchor metal or plastic prosthetic device to bone or used alone in the spine to treat osteoporotic compression fractures.

Bone cement heats up during the exothermic free-radical polymerization process, which reaches temperatures of around 82–86 °C in the body, a temperature higher than the critical level for protein denaturation in the body. This low polymerization temperature is determined by the relatively thin cement coating, which should not exceed 5 mm, and the temperature dissipation via the large prosthesis surface and the flow of blood.

The individual components of the bone cement are also known in the area of dental filler materials. Acrylate-based plastics are also used in these applications. While the individual components are not always perfectly safe as pharmaceutical additives and active substances per se, as bone cement the individual substances are either converted or fully enclosed in the cement matrix during the polymerization phase from the increase in viscosity to curing. From current knowledge, cured bone cement can now be classified as safe, as originally demonstrated during the early studies on compatibility with the body conducted in the 1950s.

More recently bone cement has been used in the spine in either vertebroplasty or kyphoplasty procedures. The composition of these types of cement is mostly based on calcium phosphate and more recently magnesium phosphate. A novel biodegradable, non-exothermic, self-setting orthopedic cement composition based on amorphous magnesium phosphate (AMP) was developed. The occurrence of undesirable exothermic reactions was avoided through using AMP as the solid precursor.

== Important information for the use of bone cement ==
What is referred to as bone cement implantation syndrome (BCIS) is described in the literature. For a long time it was believed that the incompletely converted monomer released from bone cement was the cause of circulation reactions and embolism. However, it is now known that this monomer (residual monomer) is metabolized by the respiratory chain and split into carbon dioxide and water and excreted. Embolisms can always occur during anchorage of artificial joints when material is inserted into the previously cleared femoral canal. The result is intramedullary pressure increase, potentially driving fat into the circulation.

If the patient is known to have any allergies to constituents of the bone cement, according to current knowledge bone cement should not be used to anchor the prosthesis. Anchorage without cement - cement-free implant placement - is the alternative.

New bone cement formulations require characterization according to ASTM F451. This standard describes the test methods to assess cure rate, residual monomer, mechanical strength, benzoyl peroxide concentration, and heat evolution during cure.

== Revisions ==
Revision is the replacement of a prosthesis. This means that a prosthesis previously implanted in the body is removed and replaced by a new prosthesis. Compared to the initial operation revisions are often more complex and more difficult, because every revision involves the loss of healthy bone substance. Revision operations are also more expensive for a satisfactory result. The most important goal is therefore to avoid revisions by using a good surgical procedure and using products with good (long-term) results.

Unfortunately, it is not always possible to avoid revisions. There can also be different reasons for revisions and there is a distinction between septic or aseptic revision. If it is necessary to replace an implant without confirmation of an infection—for example, aseptic—the cement is not necessarily removed completely. However, if the implant has loosened for septic reasons, the cement must be fully removed to clear an infection. In the current state of knowledge it is easier to remove cement than to release a well-anchored cement-free prosthesis from the bone site. Ultimately it is important for the stability of the revised prosthesis to detect possible loosening of the initial implant early to be able to retain as much healthy bone as possible.

A prosthesis fixed with bone cement offers very high primary stability combined with fast remobilization of patients. The cemented-in prosthesis can be fully loaded very soon after the operation because the PMMA gets most of its strength within 24 hours. The necessary rehabilitation is comparatively simple for patients who have had a cemented-in prosthesis implanted. The joints can be loaded again very soon after the operation, but the use of crutches is still required for a reasonable period for safety reasons.

Bone cement has proven particularly useful because specific active substances, e.g. antibiotics, can be added to the powder component. The active substances are released locally after implant placement of the new joint, i.e. in the immediate vicinity of the new prosthesis and have been confirmed to reduce the danger of infection. The antibiotics act against bacteria precisely at the site where they are required in the open wound without subjecting the body in general to unnecessarily high antibiotic levels. This makes bone cement a modern drug delivery system that delivers the required drugs directly to the surgical site. The important factor is not how much active substance is in the cement matrix but how much of the active substance is actually released locally. Too much active substance in the bone cement would actually be detrimental, because the mechanical stability of the fixed prosthesis is weakened by a high proportion of active substance in the cement. The local active substance levels of industrially manufactured bone cements that are formed by the use of bone cements that contain active substances are approximate (assuming that there is no incompatibility) and are significantly below the clinical routine dosages for systemic single injections.

== Suppliers ==
During February 2026 the National Health Service (NHS) in England suffered supply disruption, caused when Heraeus Medical had experienced a failure in upgrading its production process. Alternative supplies for NHS use were obtained from Zimmer Biomet, with an additional supply offer from Johnson and Johnson.

The NHS supply shortage would have been detrimental for those already on long waiting lists for surgery. The German firm supplies about three-quarters of the bone cement needed in the NHS. The product is used in more than 1,000 operations a week, mostly in knee replacements, but also in some hip and shoulder replacements

== See also ==
- Osteoplasty – use of bone cement to reduce pain
