= In papyro =

In papyro (literally, "in/on paper") is a cod Latin term for experiments or studies carried out only on paper, for example, epidemiological studies that do not involve clinical subjects, such as meta-analysis.

The term is similar to phrases such as in vivo, in vitro, or in silico. Like the latter, in papyro has no actual Latin meaning and was constructed as an analogue to the more popular and longstanding biological sciences terms (vivo and vitro). In papyro is mutually exclusive from in vitro and in vivo, but overlaps with in silico – that is, a study carried out through computer/abstract simulations can also be considered in papyro.

== See also ==
- ex vivo
- in situ
- in utero
- in vitro
- in vivo
- in silico
