= Vertebral augmentation =

Type of spinal procedure

Percutaneous vertebroplasty
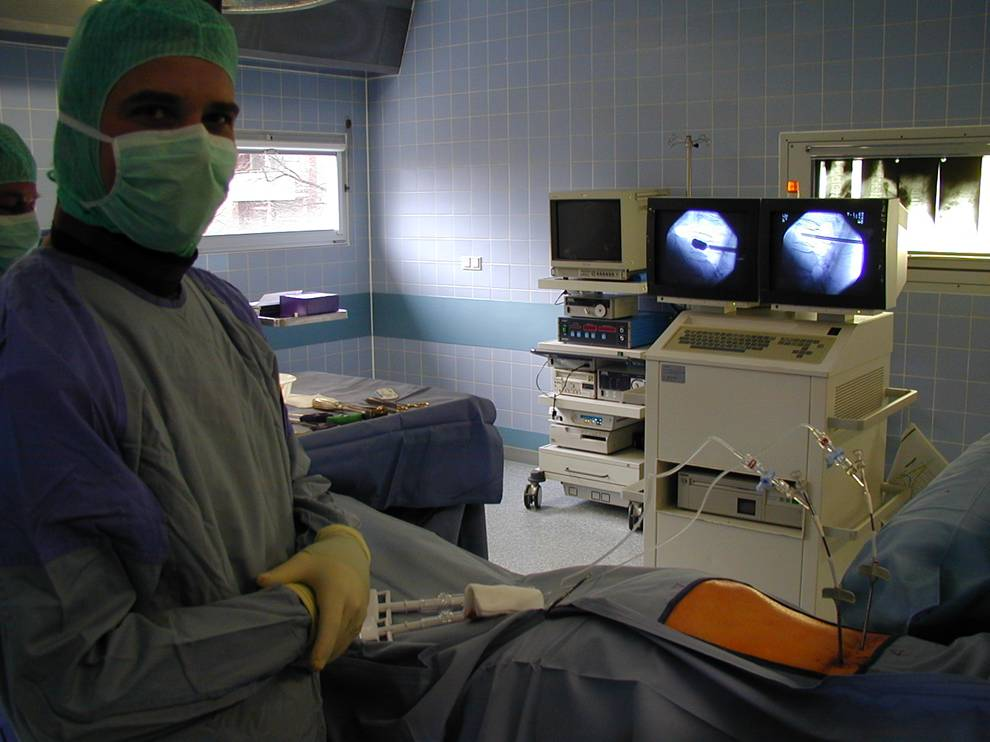
- Typical interventional suite setup for kyphoplasty
- ICD-9-CM: 81.65
- MedlinePlus: 007512

Vertebral augmentation, including vertebroplasty and kyphoplasty, refers to similar percutaneous spinal procedures in which bone cement is injected through a small hole in the skin into a fractured vertebra in order to relieve back pain caused by a vertebral compression fracture. After decades of medical research into the efficacy and safety of vertebral augmentation, there is still a lack of consensus regarding certain aspects of vertebroplasty and kyphoplasty.

== Procedure ==
Vertebroplasty and kyphoplasty are the two most common procedures for spinal augmentation.

=== Vertebroplasty ===
Vertebroplasty is typically performed by a spine surgeon or interventional radiologist. It is a minimally invasive procedure and patients usually go home the same or next day as the procedure. Patients are given local anesthesia and light sedation for the procedure, though it can be performed using only local anesthetic for patients with medical problems who cannot tolerate sedatives well.

During the procedure, bone cement is injected with a biopsy needle into the collapsed or fractured vertebra. The needle is placed with fluoroscopic x-ray guidance. The cement (most commonly poly methyl methacrylate (PMMA), although more modern cements are used as well) quickly hardens and forms a support structure within the vertebra that provide stabilization and strength. The needle makes a small puncture in the patient's skin that is easily covered with a small bandage after the procedure.

=== Kyphoplasty ===
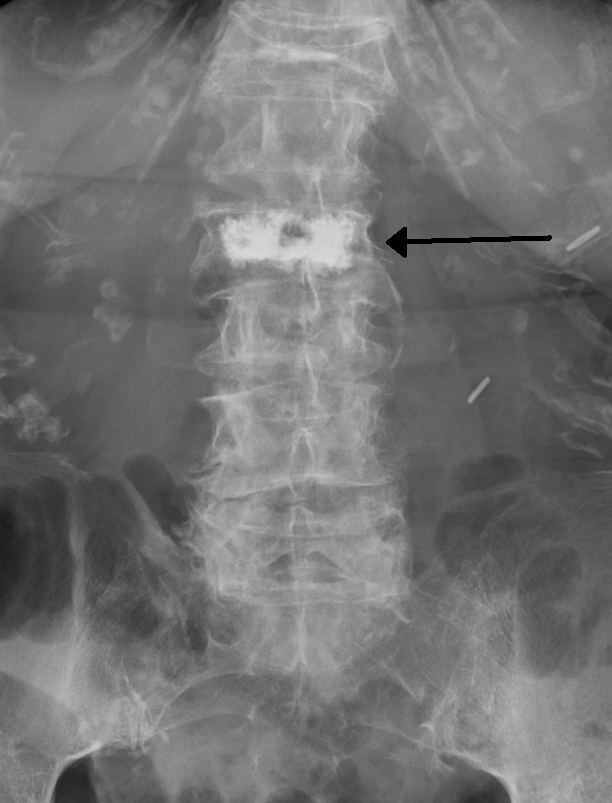
Cement in a vertebra as seen on plain Xray.

Kyphoplasty is a variation of a vertebroplasty which attempts to restore the height and angle of kyphosis of a fractured vertebra (of certain types), followed by its stabilization using injected bone cement. The procedure typically includes the use of a small balloon that is inflated in the vertebral body to create a void within the cancellous bone prior to cement delivery. Once the void is created, the procedure continues in a similar manner as a vertebroplasty, but the bone cement is typically delivered directly into the newly created void.

In a 2011 review Medicare contractor NAS determined that there is no difference between vertebroplasty and kyphoplasty, stating, "No clear evidence demonstrates that one procedure is different from another in terms of short- or long-term efficacy, complications, mortality or any other parameter useful for differentiating coverage."

== Effectiveness ==
As of 2019, the effectiveness of vertebroplasty is not supported. A 2018 Cochrane review found no role for vertebroplasty for the treatment of acute or sub-acute osteoporotic vertebral fractures. The subjects in these trials had primarily non-acute fractures and prior to the release of the results they were considered the most ideal people to receive the procedure. After trial results were released vertebroplasty advocates pointed out that people with acute vertebral fractures were not investigated. A number of non-blinded trials suggested effectiveness, but the lack of blinding limits what can be concluded from the results and some have been criticized because of being funded by the manufacturer. One analysis has attributed the difference to selection bias.

Some have suggested that this procedure only be done in those with fractures less than 8 weeks old; however, analysis of the two blinded trials appear not to support the procedure even in this acute subgroup. Others consider the procedure only appropriate for those with other health problems making rest possibly detrimental, those with metastatic cancer as the cause of the spine fracture, or those who do not improve with conservative management.

Evidence does not support a benefit of kyphoplasty over vertebroplasty with respect to pain, but the procedures may differ in restoring lost vertebral height, and in safety issues like cement extravasation (leakage). As with vertebroplasty, several unblinded studies have suggested a benefit from balloon kyphoplasty. As of 2012, no blinded studies have been performed, and since the procedure is a derivative of vertebroplasty, the unsuccessful results of these blinded studies have cast doubt upon the benefit of kyphoplasty generally.

Some vertebroplasty practitioners and some health care professional organizations continue to advocate for the procedure. In 2010, the board of directors of the American Academy of Orthopaedic Surgeons released a statement recommending strongly against use of vertebroplasty for osteoporotic spinal compression fractures, while the Australian Medical Services Advisory Committee considers both vertebroplasty and kyphoplasty only to be appropriate in those who have failed to improve after a trial of conservative treatment, with conservative treatment (analgesics primarily) being effective in two-thirds of people. The National Institute for Health and Care Excellence similarly states that the procedure in those with osteoporotic fractures is only recommended as an option if there is severe ongoing pain from a recent fracture even with optimal pain management.

Vertebral body stenting, also known by the brand Kiva, is a similar procedure which also has poor evidence to support its use.

== Adverse effects ==
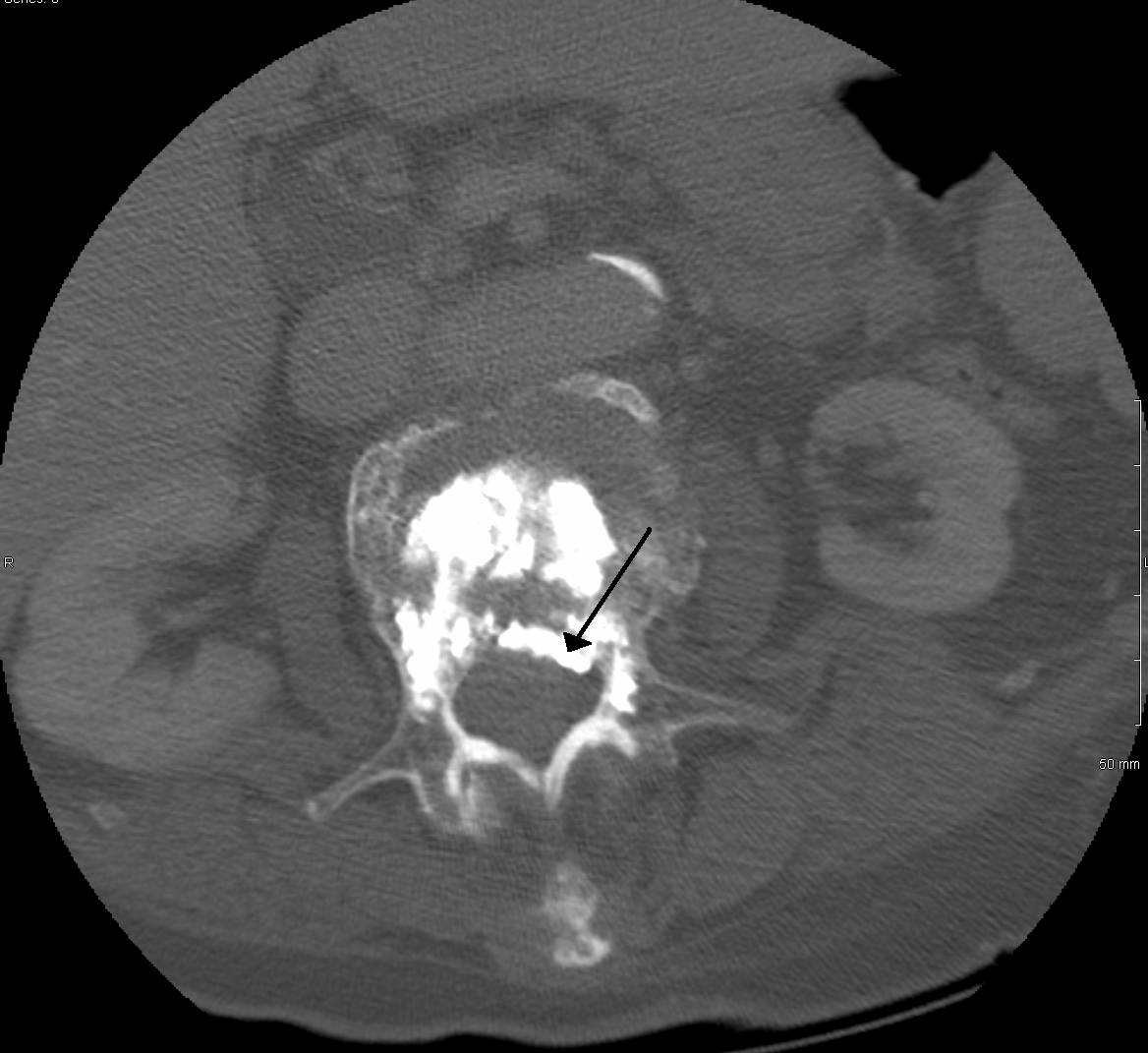
A CT image of cement used in kyphoplasty that has entered the spinal channel and is pressing on the spinal cord resulting in neurological symptoms

Some of the associated risks are from the leak of acrylic cement to outside of the vertebral body. Although severe complications are extremely rare, infection, bleeding, numbness, tingling, headache, and paralysis may ensue because of misplacement of the needle or cement. This particular risk is decreased by the use of X-ray or other radiological imaging to ensure proper placement of the cement. In those who have fractures due to cancer, the risk of serious adverse events appears to be greater at 2%.

The risk of new fractures following these procedures does not appear to be changed; however, evidence is limited, and an increase risk as of 2012 is not ruled out. Pulmonary cement embolism is reported to occur in approximately 2-26% of procedures. It may occur with or without symptoms. Typically, if there are no symptoms, there are no long term issues. Symptoms do occur in about 1 in 2000 procedures. Other adverse effects include spinal cord injury in 0.6 per 1000.

== Prevalence ==
In the United States in 2003 approximately 25,000 vertebroplasty procedures were paid for by Medicare. As of 2011/2012 this number may be as high as 70,000-100,000 per year.

== History ==
Vertebroplasty had been performed as an open procedure for many decades to secure pedicle screws and fill tumorous voids. However, the results were not always worth the risk involved with an open procedure, which was the reason for the development of percutaneous vertebroplasty.

The first percutaneous vertebroplasty was performed in 1984 at the University Hospital of Amiens, France to fill a vertebral void left after the removal of a benign spinal tumor. A report of this and 6 other patients was published in 1987 and it was introduced in the United States in the early 1990s. Initially, the treatment was used primarily for tumors in Europe and vertebral compression fractures in the United States, although the distinction has largely gone away since then.

== Society and culture ==
=== Terminology ===
These medical terms are classical compounds of the suffix -plasty meaning "molding or shaping surgically" (from Ancient Greek plastós "molded, formed") and the prefixes vertebro- "vertebra" (from Latin vertebra "joint, joint of the spine") and kypho- "humped; stooping forward" (from Ancient Greek kyphos "crooked").

=== Cost ===
The cost of vertebroplasty in Europe as of 2010 was ~2,500 Euro. As of 2010 in the United States, when done as an outpatient, vertebroplasty costs around US$3300 while kyphoplasty costs around US$8100 and when done as an inpatient vertebroplasty cost ~US$11,000 and kyphoplasty US$16,000. The cost difference is due to kyphoplasty being an in-patient procedure while vertebroplasty is outpatient, and due to the balloons used in the kyphoplasty procedure. Medicare in 2011 spent about US$1 billion on the procedures. A 2013 study found that "the average adjusted costs for vertebroplasty patients within the first quarter and the first 2 years postsurgery were $14,585 and $44,496, respectively. The corresponding average adjusted costs for kyphoplasty patients were $15,117 and $41,339. There were no significant differences in adjusted costs in the first 9 months postsurgery, but kyphoplasty patients were associated with significantly lower adjusted treatment costs by 6.8–7.9% in the remaining periods through two years postsurgery."

=== Medicare response ===
In response to the NEJM articles and a medical record review showing misuse of vertebroplasty and kyphoplasty, US Medicare contractor Noridian Administrative Services (NAS) conducted a literature review and formed a policy regarding reimbursement of the procedures. NAS states that in order to be reimbursable, a procedure must meet certain criteria, including, 1) a detailed and extensively documented medical record showing pain caused by a fracture, 2) radiographic confirmation of a fracture, 3) that other treatment plans were attempted for a reasonable amount of time, 4) that the procedure is not performed in the emergency department, and 5) that at least one year of follow-up is planned for, among others. The policy, as referenced, applies only to the region covered by Noridian and not all of Medicare's coverage area. The reimbursement policy became effective on 20 June 2011. A 2015 comparative study of Medicare patients with vertebral compression fractures found that those who received balloon kyphoplasty and vertebroplasty therapies experienced lower mortality and overall morbidity than those who received conservative nonoperative management.

=== Promotion ===
In 2015, it was reported by The Atlantic that a person associated with a medical device company that sells equipment related to the kyphoplasty procedure had edited the Wikipedia article on the subject to promote claims about its efficacy. Assertions about the positive effects of kyphoplasty have been found to be unsupported or disproven, according to independent researchers.
