= In simulacra =

In simulacra is a Latin phrase meaning "within likenesses." The phrase is used similarly to in vivo or ex vivo to denote the context of an experiment. In this case, the phrase denotes that the experiment is not conducted in the actual subject, but rather a model of such.

== See also ==
- List of Latin phrases
