= Anthrax toxin =

Tripartite protein complex secreted by virulent strains of Bacillus anthracis

Anthrax toxin lethal factor middle domain
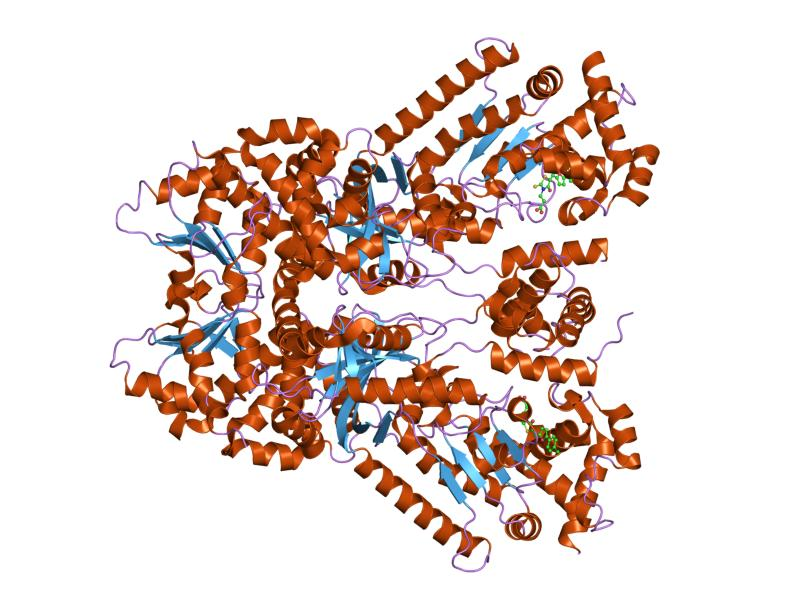
- X-ray crystal structure of the anthrax lethal factor bound to a small molecule inhibitor, bi-mfm3, 3-{5-[5-(4-chloro-phenyl)-furan-2-ylmethylene]-4-oxo-2-thioxo-thiazolidin-3-yl}-propionic acid.

Identifiers
- Symbol: Anthrax-tox_M
- Pfam: PF09156
- InterPro: IPR015239
- SCOP2: 1j7n / SCOPe / SUPFAM
- OPM superfamily: 35
Available protein structures:
- PDB: IPR015239 PF09156 (ECOD; PDBsum)
- AlphaFold: IPR015239; PF09156

Anthrax toxin lethal factor N and C terminal domains
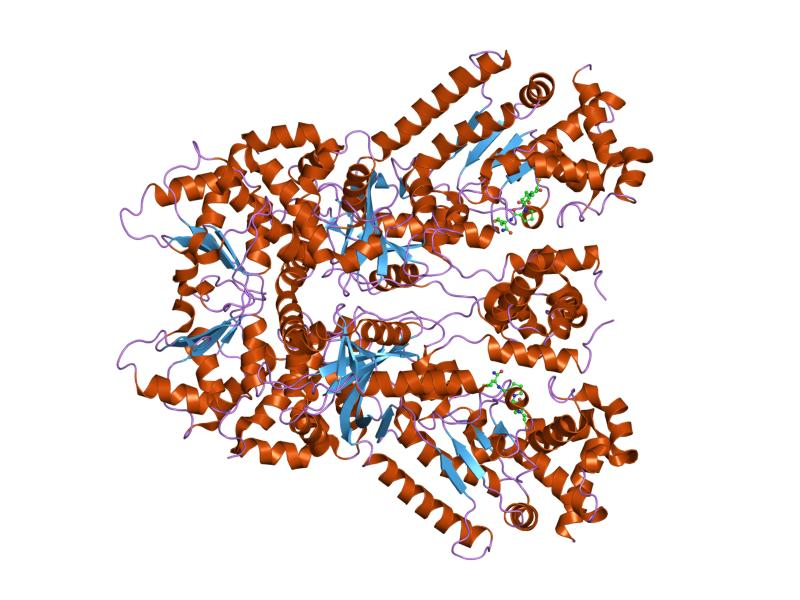
- crystal structure of anthrax lethal factor complexed with thioacetyl-tyr-pro-met-amide, a metal-chelating peptidyl small molecule inhibitor

Identifiers
- Symbol: ATLF
- Pfam: PF07737
- InterPro: IPR014781
- MEROPS: M34
- SCOP2: 1pwq / SCOPe / SUPFAM
Available protein structures:
- PDB: IPR014781 PF07737 (ECOD; PDBsum)
- AlphaFold: IPR014781; PF07737

Anthrax toxin LF subunit

Identifiers
- Symbol: Anthrax_toxA
- Pfam: PF03497
- SCOP2: 1jky / SCOPe / SUPFAM
Available protein structures:
- PDB: PF03497 (ECOD; PDBsum)
- AlphaFold: PF03497

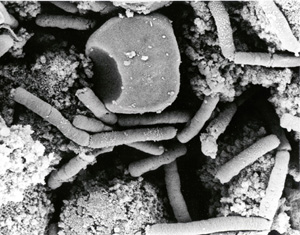
Figure 1. Electron micrograph of the anthrax causing bacteria, Bacillus anthracis.

Anthrax toxin is a three-protein exotoxin secreted by virulent strains of the bacterium, Bacillus anthracis—the causative agent of anthrax. The toxin was first discovered by Harry Smith in 1954. Anthrax toxin is composed of a cell-binding protein, known as protective antigen (PA), and two enzyme components, called edema factor (EF) and lethal factor (LF). These three protein components act together to impart their physiological effects. Assembled complexes containing the toxin components are endocytosed. In the endosome, the enzymatic components of the toxin translocate into the cytoplasm of a target cell. Once in the cytosol, the enzymatic components of the toxin disrupt various immune cell functions, namely cellular signaling and cell migration. The toxin may even induce cell lysis, as is observed for macrophage cells. Anthrax toxin allows the bacteria to evade the immune system, proliferate, and ultimately kill the host animal. Research on anthrax toxin also provides insight into the generation of macromolecular assemblies, and on protein translocation, pore formation, endocytosis, and other biochemical processes.

== Bacillus anthracis virulence factors ==
Anthrax is a disease caused by Bacillus anthracis, a spore-forming, Gram positive, rod-shaped bacterium (Fig. 1). The lethality of the disease is caused by the bacterium's two principal virulence factors: (i) the polyglutamic acid capsule, which is anti-phagocytic, and (ii) the tripartite protein toxin, called anthrax toxin. Anthrax toxin is a mixture of three protein components: (i) protective antigen (PA), (ii) edema factor (EF), and (iii) lethal factor (LF).

== Mechanism of action ==
Anthrax toxin is an A-B toxin. Each individual anthrax toxin protein is nontoxic. Toxic symptoms are not observed when these proteins are injected individually into laboratory animals. The co-injection of PA and EF causes edema, and the co-injection of PA and LF is lethal. The former combination is called edema toxin, and the latter combination is called lethal toxin. Thus the manifestation of physiological symptoms requires PA, in either case.

The PA requirement observed in animal-model experiments demonstrates a common paradigm for bacterial toxins, called the A / B paradigm. The A component is enzymatically active, and the B component is the cell binding component. Anthrax toxin is of the form A_{2}B, where the two enzymes, EF and LF, are the A components and PA is the B component. PA is necessary for the enzymatic components to enter the cell. It does this by the formation of pores that span the cell membrane, allowing the entry of the toxin, though the mechanism is not fully understood. Once in the cytosol, they may then catalyze reactions that disrupt normal cellular physiology.

=== Anthrax toxin assembly and translocation ===
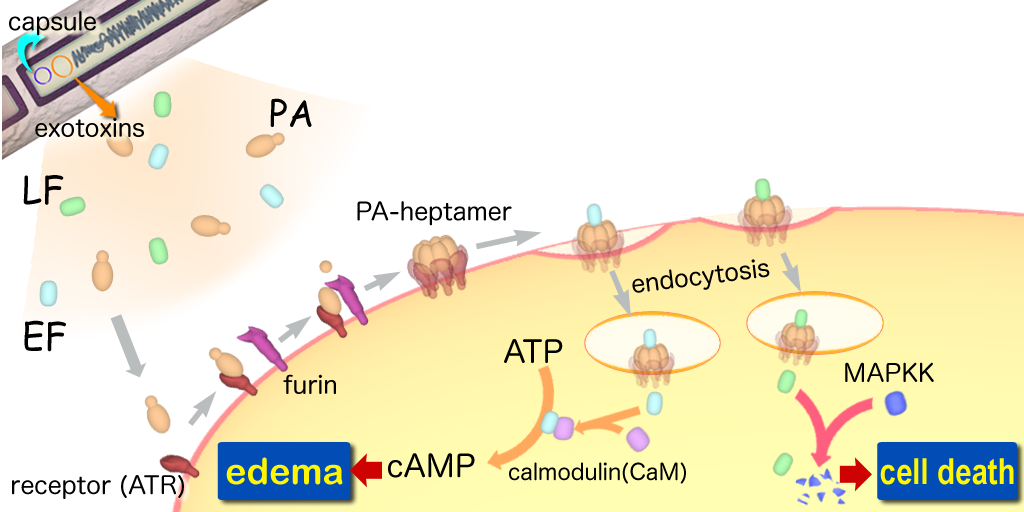
Diagram of the actions of the secreted anthrax toxins

Anthrax toxin protein components must assemble into holotoxin complexes to function. In order for LF and EF to function inside a target cell, they must localize to the cell and enter its cytoplasm. Through a series of steps, PA can translocate EF and LF into the cell (Fig. 2). This process starts when the 83-kDa form of PA, called PA83, binds to an anthrax toxin receptor. There are two known homologous receptors, which bind to PA83, called tumor endothelium marker-8 (TEM8) and capillary morphogenesis protein 2 (CMG2). Then a 20 kDa fragment (PA20) is cleaved off PA83's amino terminus by membrane endoproteases from the furin family. When PA20 dissociates, the remaining receptor-bound portion of PA, called PA63, may assemble into either a heptameric or octameric ring-shaped oligomer. This ring-shaped oligomer is often referred to as the pre-pore (or pre-channel) form of PA, since later in the pathway it will become a translocase pore (or channel). The surface of the pre-pore oligomer, which was exposed upon release of the PA20 moiety, can then bind to LF and EF. The heptameric and octameric forms of the PA oligomer may then bind with up to three or four molecules of EF and/or LF, respectively. The cell then endocytoses these assembled complexes and carries them to an acidic compartment in the cell. The low pH encountered in the endosome causes the PA63 pre-channel to convert into a cation-selective channel. EF and LF are driven through the channel by a pH gradient, allowing the enzyme factors to enter the cytosol.

=== Enzyme function of LF and EF ===
Once in the cytosol, the EF and LF then carry out their respective damage-inducing processes.

- EF acts as a Ca^{2+} and calmodulin dependent adenylate cyclase that greatly increases the level of cAMP in the cell. This increase in cAMP upsets water homeostasis, severely imbalances the intracellular signaling pathways, and impairs macrophage function, allowing the bacteria to further evade the immune system.
- LF also helps the bacteria evade the immune system through killing macrophages. Once in these cells, LF acts as a Zn^{2+}-dependent endoprotease that snips off the N-terminus of mitogen-activated protein kinase kinases (MAPKK). This inhibits these kinases by not allowing them to efficiently bind to their substrates, which leads to altered signaling pathways and ultimately to apoptosis.

Thus, the synergistic effect of these three proteins leads to cellular death through a cascade of events that allow the proteins to enter the cell and disrupt cellular function.

== Extracellular toxin structure-function relationship ==
The mechanism of anthrax toxin action is the result of the molecular structures of the three toxin proteins in combination with biomolecules of the host cell. The molecular interactions are apparent upon performing a detailed analysis of the structures of PA, EF, LF, and the cellular receptors (ANTXR1 and ANTXR2). Structures for the toxin molecules (Figs. 3–5), the receptor, and the complexes of the molecules all provided insight into the synergistic actions of these proteins. Analyses on binding sites and conformational changes augmented the structural studies, elucidating the functions of each domain of PA, LF, and EF, as briefly outlined in Table 1.

The structure of PA was the first to be determined (Fig. 3). This structure and that of its cellular receptor shed much light on the specificity of recognition and binding. This specificity of PA and the receptor CMG2 (similar to type I integrins) is due to interactions through a metal ion dependent adhesion site (MIDAS), a hydrophobic groove, and a β-hairpin projection. These all contribute to a tight interaction in which much protein surface area on CMG2 (and TEM8) is buried.

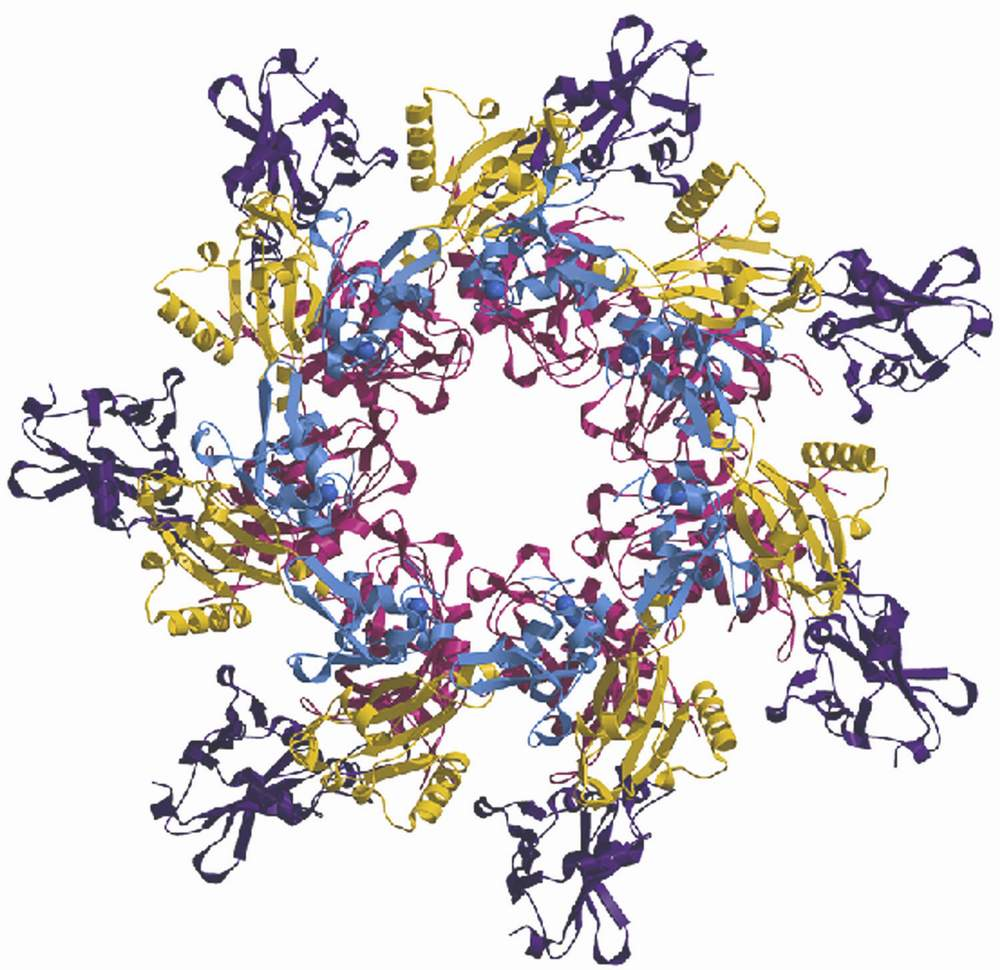
Ribbon diagram of a PA_{63} heptamer forming a pre-pore.

Petosa et al. solved the structure of a PA63 heptamer at 4.5 Å (0.45 nm). The structure they solved was of a non-membrane bound pre-pore, the conformation of the heptamer before the complex extends a β-barrel through the plasma membrane to shuttle the LF and EF into the cytosol.

Heptamerization and pore formation is sterically hindered by the PA20 fragment, but when it is removed from the top of the monomer, the pre-pore is quickly formed. The heptamer formation causes no major changes in the conformation of each individual monomer, but by coming together, more than 15400 Å^{2} (154 nm^{2}) of protein surface is buried. This buried surface consists mostly of polar or charged side groups from domains 1 and 2.

PA also forms an octameric pre-channel structure. The octameric form was shown to be more thermostable than the heptameric form, and hence the octameric oligomer can persist in the plasma of the host during an anthrax infection.

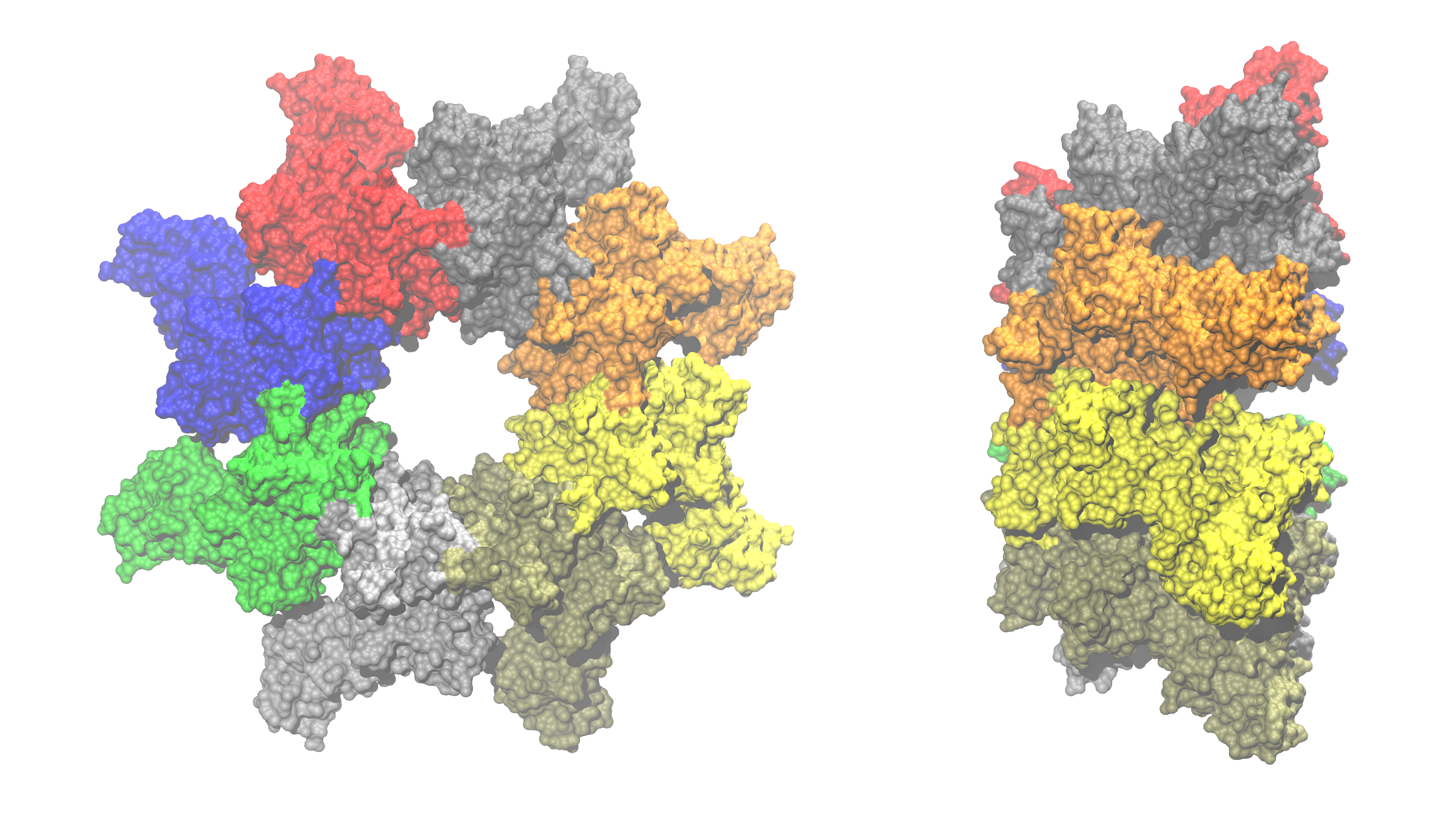
PA63 octamer prechannel (3HVD)

During the oligomerization of PA63, molecules of EF and/or LF rapidly and simultaneously bind to the PA prechannel. This binding occurs because after removing the PA20 domain, a large hydrophobic surface is uncovered on domain 1 of PA63. Domain 1 provides a large surface that interacts with the N-terminus of EF and LF, which is almost completely homologous for the first ~36 residues and similar in tertiary structure for the first ~250 residues. Studies on the binding region of LF and EF demonstrated that a large surface area contacts with domain 1 of two adjacent PA63 molecules when in the heptamer conformation. This large binding area explains why previous studies could only bind up to three molecules on a PA63 heptamer. The co-crystal structure of the PA octamer in complex with N-terminal LF revealed that the binding interaction is, in fact, two discontinuous sites. One site, termed the C-terminal subsite, resembles a classic "hot-spot" with predicted salt bridges and electrostatic interactions. The other site, termed the alpha-clamp subsite, is a deep cleft that nonspecifically binds the N-terminal alpha helix and short beta-strand of LF, guiding the N-terminus of the substrate towards the PA prechannel lumen. In this manner, the alpha clamp aids in protein translocation, nonspecifically binding and subsequently unfolding secondary structure as it unfurls from the substrate. The LF/EF binding site is now being utilized for delivery of therapeutics via fusion proteins.

Upon formation of the prepore and attachment of LF and/or EF, the heptamer migrates to a lipid raft where it is rapidly endocytosed. Endocytosis occurs as a result of a series of events. This begins when CMG2 or TEM8 is palmitoylated, which inhibits the association of the receptor with lipid rafts. This inhibits the receptor from being endocytosed before PA83 is cleaved and before LF or EF can associate with the heptamer. Reassociation of the receptor with the cholesterol and glycosphigolipid-rich microdomains (lipid rafts) occurs when PA63 binds to the receptor and heptamerizes. Once the receptor and PA returns to the lipid raft, E3 ubiquitin ligase Cb1 ubiquitinates the cytoplasmic tail of the receptor, signaling the receptor and associated toxin proteins for endocytosis. Dynamin and Eps15 are required for this endocytosis to occur, indicating that anthrax toxin enters the cell via the clathrin-dependent pathway.

As discussed, each molecule interacts with several others in order to induce the endocytosis of the anthrax toxin. Once inside, the complex is transferred to an acidic compartment, where the heptamer, still in the non-membrane-spanning pre-pore conformation, is prepared for translocation of EF and LF into the cytosol.

== Structure-function relationship from vesicle to cytosol ==
=== Pore formation ===
At first glance, the primary sequence of PA does not look like that of a membrane-spanning protein. A hydrophobicity plot lacks any patterns which are common to possible membrane-spanning domains. The structures of other multimeric membrane proteins (such as diphtheria toxin) provide the answer to how PA manages to span the membrane. It is thought that PA acts like these multimeric membrane proteins that form β-barrels made from stretches of both polar and non-polar amino acids from each monomer.

Greek-key motif.

The formation of the β-barrel pore is facilitated with a drop in pH. To form the barrel when the pH drops, PA63 domain 2 must undergo the greatest conformation change. Upon examination of the structure of domain 2 (Fig. 7), one can see that this domain contains a Greek-key motif (the gold portion in Fig. 7). A general schematic of a Greek-key motif is shown in Fig. 8. Attached to the Greek-key in domain 2 is a large disordered loop. The necessity of this loop in pore formation is shown through using mutagenesis and proteolysis of the loop with chymotrypsin. Additional electrophysiological measurements of cysteine substitutions place the amino acids of this loop inside the lumen of the membrane inserted pore. The disordered loop in domain 2 also has a pattern of alternating hydrophobic and hydrophilic amino acids, which is a pattern conserved in the membrane-spanning portions of porins. The only problem is that the loop is not large enough to span a membrane in a β-barrel. This membrane insertion could only occur with additional conformational changes. A large conformational change takes place where the Greek-key motif unfolds, forming a β-hairpin that projects downward into the membrane and forms a β-barrel with the other 6 monomers of the complex (figures 9a and 9b). The final pore has a diameter of 12 Å (1.2 nm), which fits the theoretical value of this model.

This model would require large conformational changes in domain 2 along with the breaking of many hydrogen bonds as the Greek-key motif peels away from the center of the domain. Petosa et al. proposed a model of how this occurs. Insertion of the PA Greek key motifs into the membrane occurs when the heptamer is acidified. On artificial bilayers, this occurs when the pH is dropped from 7.4 to 6.5, suggesting that the trigger for insertion involves a titration of histidines. This indeed fits the sequence of PA since domain 2 contains a number of histidines (shown as asterisks in figure 9a). Three histidine residues are found in the disordered loop, one of which lies with a Greek-key histidine within a cluster of polar amino acids. This cluster (including the two histidines, three arginines and one glutamate) is embedded at the top of the Greek-key motif, so it is easy to see that the protonation of these histidines would disrupt the cluster. Furthermore, another histidine is located at the base of the Greek-key motif along with a number of hydrophobic residues (on the green segment in figures 7 and 9a). At pH 7.4 this segment is ordered, but when the crystals are grown at pH 6.0, it becomes disordered. This order to disorder transition is the initial step of PA membrane insertion.

PA is endocytosed as a soluble heptamer attached to its receptors, with LF or EF attached to the heptamer as cargo. The first step after endocytosis is the acidification of the endocytotic vesicle. The acidification plays two roles in the lifespan of the toxin. First, it helps to relax the tight grip of the CMG2 or TEM8 receptor on PA, facilitating the pore formation (the different receptors allow for insertion at a slightly different pH). Second, the drop in pH causes a disordered loop and a Greek-key motif in the PA domain 2 to fold out of the heptamer pre-pore and insert through the wall of the acidic vesicle, leading to pore formation (Figures 7–9).

Santelli et al. explained more about the process after they determined the crystal structure of the PA/CMG2 complex. The structure of this complex shows the binding of CMG2 by both domain 2 and 4 of PA. This interaction demonstrates less freedom to unfold the Greek key. Further analysis shows that seven of the nine histidines in PA are on the domain 2/domain 4 interface. Protonation of these histidines causes the domains to separate enough to allow the Greek-key to flop out and help form the β-hairpin involved in insertion. In addition, when PA binds to CMG2, insertion no longer occurs at a pH of 6.5, as it does when inserted into an artificial membrane. Instead it requires a pH of 5.0 for insertion in natural cells. This difference was explained to be the result of the pocket next to the MIDAS motif in CMG2. This pocket contains a histidine buried at the bottom where domain 2 attaches. This histidine is protonated at a lower pH and adds greater stability to PA. This added stability keeps the Greek-key from being able to move until more acidic conditions are met. These histidines all work in conjunction to keep the heptamer from inserting prematurely before endocytosis occurs.

Santelli and colleagues (Fig. 10) also built a hypothetical structure of the membrane-inserted PA/CMG2 structure. This model shows that the β-barrel is about 70 Å (7 nm) long, 30 Å (3 nm) of which span the membrane and the 40 Å (4 nm) gap is actually filled in with the rest of the extracellular portion of the CMG2 receptor (~100 residues). CMG2 provides additional support to the pore.

=== Protein translocation ===
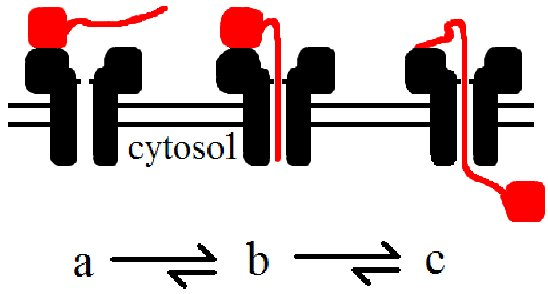
Diagram of protein translocation.

Several recent studies demonstrate how the PA63 pore allows the EF and LF into the cytoplasm when its lumen is so small. The lumen on the PA63 pore is only 15 Å (1.5 nm) across, which is much smaller than the diameter of LF or EF. Translocation occurs through a series of events which begin in the endosome as it acidifies. LF and EF are pH sensitive, and as the pH drops, their structures lose stability. Below a pH of 6.0 (the pH in an endosome), both LF and EF become disordered molten globules. When a molecule is in this conformation, the N-terminus is freed and drawn into the pore by the proton gradient and positive transmembrane potential. A ring of seven phenylalanines at the mouth endosome side of the pore (phenylalanine clamp) assists in the unfolding of LF or EF by interacting with the hydrophobic residues found in LF or EF. The proton gradient then begins to lace the protein though the pore. The lacing mechanism is driven by the gradient, but requires the phenylalanine clamp for a ratcheting motion. The first 250 residues of EF and LF have an irregular alternating sequence of basic, acidic, and hydrophobic residues. The interplay between the phenylalanine clamp and the protonation state cause a ratcheting effect that drives the protein though until enough has crossed into the cytoplasm to drag the rest through the pore as the N-terminus refolds.
