= Osteolytic lesion =

Softened section of a bone

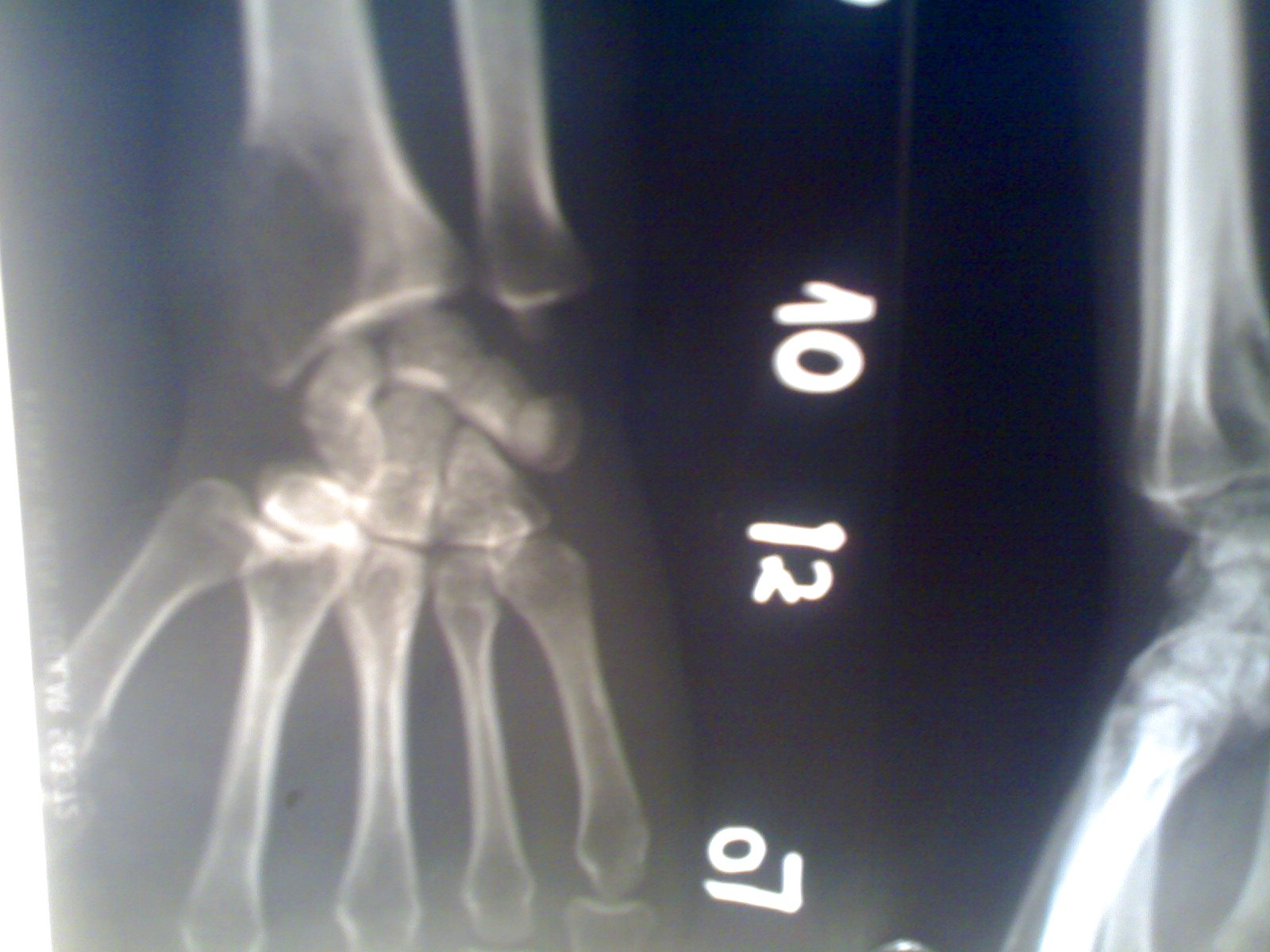
Osteolytic lesion at the bottom of the radius, diagnosed by a darker section that indicates a loss of bone density

An osteolytic lesion (from the Greek words for "bone" (ὀστέον), and "to unbind" (λύειν)) is a softened section of a patient's bone formed as a symptom of specific diseases, including breast cancer and multiple myeloma. This softened area appears as a hole on X-ray scans due to decreased bone density, although many other diseases are associated with this symptom. Osteolytic lesions can cause pain, increased risk of bone fracture, and spinal cord compression. These lesions can be treated using bisphosphonates or radiation, though new solutions are being tested in clinical trials.

== Cellular causes ==
Bone lesions are caused by an imbalance of regulatory factors, characterized by an increased depletion and resorption of old bone tissue and a decrease in bone rebuilding, known as bone remodeling. This imbalance is due to a flooding of regulatory factors released by specific tumors, thus overwhelming the tissue repair system and resulting in these lesions. The over-activity of osteoclasts can also cause hypercalcemia, which can cause damage to the kidneys and requires additional medication and monitoring.

In multiple myeloma, an increased number of myeloma cells block osteoblasts from creating new bone, while these cancerous cells also release factors that cause an upregulation on osteoclasts, causing an increasing in bone tissue resorption and an overall breakdown of bone integrity. This breakdown often begins in the bone marrow near tumor sites and spreads outward to the surface of the implicated bone.

The most common cancers that metastasize to form osteolytic lesions are thyroid, lung, kidney, gastrointestinal, melanoma, and breast cancer, although any cancer can cause bone lesions. Lesions are most often found in larger bones, such as the skull, pelvis, radius, and femur.

== Potential treatments ==
=== Bisphosphonates ===
Bisphosphonates are drugs that are used to prevent bone mass loss and are often used to treat osteolytic lesions. Zoledronic acid (Reclast) is a specific drug given to cancer patients to prevent the worsening of bone lesions and has been reported to have anti-tumor effects as well. Zoledronic acid has been clinically tested in conjunction with calcium and vitamin D to encourage bone health. Denosumab, a monoclonal antibody treatment RANKl inhibitor that targets the osteocyte apoptosis regulatory RANKL gene, is also prescribed to prevent bone metastases and bone lesions. Most bisphosphonates are co-prescribed with disease-specific treatments, such as chemotherapy or radiation for cancer patients.

=== Radiation ===
Bone lesions in multiple myeloma patients may be treated with low-dose radiation therapy in order to reduce pain and other symptoms. Used in combination with immunochemotherapy, radiation therapy can be used to treat certain cancers when aimed at areas of bone lesion and softened bone.
