= Welder's anthrax =

Occupational disease

Welder's Anthrax
- Specialty: Infectious disease
- Symptoms: Pneumonia like
- Causes: Bacillus cereus group bacteria
- Risk factors: Welding; metalworking without sufficient ventilation
- Treatment: Antibiotics, antitoxin
- Medication: Obiltoxaximab
- Frequency: Nine documented cases since 1994
- Deaths: Six

Welder's anthrax is a disease that closely resembles anthrax and is seemingly associated with welders and other metal workers. The term was first coined in 2022 in a paper that noted a cluster of cases presenting as severe pneumonia among welders attributed to anthrax toxin. Though illness attributed to anthrax toxin is typically associated with infection by anthrax bacteria, Bacillus anthracis, these workers appeared to be infected with different disease-causing bacteria, Bacillus cereus biovar anthracis, that were able to produce the toxin by means of a plasmid.

The US Centers for Disease Control (CDC) has recognized that metalworkers, especially welders, are at risk of catching welder's anthrax. The cause of the elevated risk is not well understood, but researchers have speculated that metal fumes, and specifically iron oxide, inhaled by metal workers may create susceptibility to the disease.

== Epidemiology ==
As of January 2026, nine cases have been documented by the US CDC (six fatal), all involving metalworkers from Texas and Louisiana. The bacteria Bacillus tropicus was isolated from a patient in September 2024.

== Treatment ==
Obiltoxaximab, a monoclonal antibody anthrax antitoxin, was used to successfully treat welder's anthrax in September 2024.
