= Texas Veterinary Medical Diagnostic Laboratory =

Texas A&M Veterinary Medical Diagnostic Laboratory
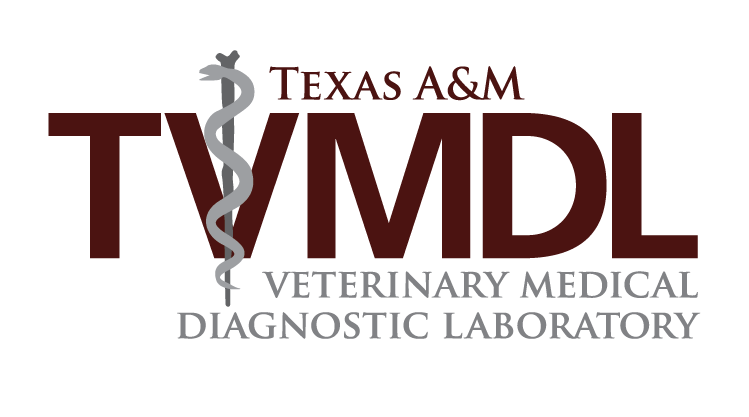
- Texas A&M Veterinary Medical Diagnostic Laboratory Logo

Agency overview
- Formed: 1967
- Jurisdiction: Texas
- Headquarters: College Station, Texas, United States
- Employees: 161 (FY 2021)
- Agency executives: Amy K. Swinford, Director; Stacy Morris, Associate Agency Director
- Parent agency: Texas A&M University System
- Website: https://tvmdl.tamu.edu/

Texas A&M Veterinary Medical Diagnostic Laboratory (TVMDL) is an integral part of the Texas A&M University System. It consists of four lab locations spread across Texas; two full-service laboratories located in Canyon and College Station and two poultry laboratories in Center and Gonzales.

With its strategic locations, TVMDL is uniquely positioned to serve the animal industries of Texas. TVMDL receives approximately 200,000 accessions and runs over 1 million tests per year. Submissions received in the laboratory originate from Texas, neighboring states, and around the world.

TVMDL employs approximately 100 staff at its College Station location and approximately 30 staff in Canyon. Both the Canyon and College Station locations house BSL-2 and BSL-3 laboratory space. The Center facility has a staff of eight while the Gonzales laboratory employs five; both consist of BSL-2 laboratory space. In its entirety, TVMDL employs over 30 professionals who hold a DVM and/or PhD. Over a dozen hold board certifications in their specialty.

Texas legislators created TVMDL during the regular session of the 60th Legislature, in 1967; the lab formally opened in College Station in 1969. The Amarillo facility opened its doors in 1975; in 2020 the location moved onto the campus of West Texas A&M University in Canyon. In 1991 the 72nd Legislature transferred the Salmonella Pullorum-Typhoid Program, Texas’s complementary program to the National Poultry Improvement Plan, to TVMDL and also granted administrative responsibilities from the Texas Agricultural Experiment Station (now Texas A&M AgriLife Research) for the poultry diagnostic laboratories in Center and Gonzales. TVMDL’s mission expanded under new legislative direction to include drug-testing services for the pari-mutuel horse racing industry in 1989 and for the greyhound racing industry in 1992.

Laboratory tests are performed on many different types of specimens sent or brought to the laboratory. The efforts of TVMDL staff are directed to diagnosis only; treatment of sick animals or surgery is not performed. Specimens received may be deceased animals brought to the laboratory for examination or tissue specimens collected from animals in the field or in a veterinary clinic. Laboratory income is derived from state appropriations and fees charged for services rendered.

TVMDL’s primary clients are Texas animal owners and veterinarians; state and federal agencies, including the Texas Animal Health Commission; Texas Parks and Wildlife Department; Texas Department of Criminal Justice; the U.S. Department of Agriculture; and the state’s food animal industries. TVMDL provides service to these clients by conducting laboratory tests on specimens from live or deceased animals and their environments. In addition, the laboratories facilitate commerce of Texas livestock by providing tests required for international, intrastate, and interstate movement of animals. TVMDL also provides critical laboratory data necessary to identify disease outbreaks, including emerging, reemerging, and zoonotic diseases, and provides appropriate warnings to individuals and governmental agencies. Early disease detection is a critical contribution by TVMDL to the One Health/One Medicine approach to ensuring public health.

TVMDL is a part of the National Animal Health Laboratory Network (NAHLN), a group of state and regional laboratories performing surveillance testing for high-consequence agricultural and zoonotic pathogens, organized by USDA APHIS. TVMDL staff receive annual training, follow nationwide standard operating procedures, and stand ready to perform surge capacity testing in the event of an animal disease outbreak. As a member of the NAHLN, TVMDL performs testing and surveillance for avian influenza, H1N1 influenza, foot and mouth disease, vesicular stomatitis, contagious equine metritis, classical swine fever (hog cholera), scrapie, and chronic wasting disease in deer.

TVMDL is headquartered in College Station, Texas on the Texas A&M University campus. It is not associated with the Texas A&M Gastrointestinal Lab (GI Lab), also located on the same campus. Both labs conduct veterinary diagnostic tests.

Historical Cases

In 1981, Texas A&M Veterinary Medical Diagnostic Laboratory discovered a new strain of anthrax dubbed the Ames strain, which isolated from a diseased 14-month-old Beefmaster heifer that died in Sarita, Texas. This particular strain was later used in the 2001 anthrax attacks in which seven letters mailed to media outlets and US Senators on September 18, 2001, and October 9, 2001.
