= Vullum =

Vullum is a surname. Notable people with the surname include:

- Erik Vullum (1850–1916), Norwegian journalist, writer, and politician
- Margrethe Vullum (1846–1918), Danish-born Norwegian journalist, literary critic, and proponent for women's rights

== See also ==
- Vollum
