= Ames strain =

Strain of the anthrax bacterium

The Ames strain is one of 89 known strains of the anthrax bacterium (Bacillus anthracis). It was isolated from a diseased 14-month-old Beefmaster heifer that died in Sarita, Texas in 1981. The strain was isolated at the Texas Veterinary Medical Diagnostic Laboratory and a sample was sent to the United States Army Medical Research Institute of Infectious Diseases (USAMRIID). Researchers at USAMRIID mistakenly believed the strain came from Ames, Iowa because the return address on the package was the USDA's National Veterinary Services Laboratories in Ames and mislabeled the specimen.

The Ames strain came to wide public attention during the 2001 anthrax attacks when seven letters containing it were mailed to media outlets and US Senators on September 18, 2001, and October 9, 2001.

Because of its virulence, the Ames strain is used by the United States for developing vaccines and testing their effectiveness. Use of the Ames strain started in the 1980s, after work on weaponizing the Vollum 1B strain ended and all weaponized stocks were destroyed after the end of the U.S. biological warfare program in 1969.

== Virulence ==
=== Virulence plasmids ===
Researchers have identified two specific virulence plasmids in B. anthracis, with the Ames strain expressing greater virulence compared to other strains. The virulence of B. anthracis results from two plasmids, pXO1 and pXO2. Plasmid pXO2 encodes an antiphagocytic poly-D-glutamic acid capsule, which allows B. anthracis to evade the host immune system. Plasmid pXO1 encodes three toxin proteins: edema factor (EF), lethal factor (LF) and protective antigen (PA). Variation in virulence can be explained by the presence or absence of plasmids; for example, isolates missing either pXO1 or pXO2 are considered attenuated, meaning they will not cause significant infection. One possible mechanism that may be responsible for the regulation of virulence is the copy number of plasmids per cell. The number of plasmids among isolates varies, with as many as 243 copies of pXO1 and 32 copies of pXO2 per cell. Studies have shown that pXO2 contributes significantly to the observed variation in virulence, as mutants producing greater amounts of the capsule show a higher level of virulence. Virulent strains that were cured of the pXO1 plasmid, but had the Ames pXO2 plasmid were still fully virulent for mice; thus, the Ames pXO2 plasmid specifically appears to give a higher level of virulence, as strains that are missing one of the plasmids are usually attenuated. Additionally, isolates that carried the Ames pXO2 were found to be more virulent than those with the Vollum 1B strain pXO2, also a virulent strain. Another well-known strain of anthrax, the Sterne strain, is avirulent, meaning it does not cause significant illness in animals or humans.

== Antibiotic resistance ==
The Ames strain is susceptible to the antibiotics recommended for the treatment of anthrax and for post-exposure prophylaxis by the United States CDC. This susceptibility is similar to most other strains of Bacillus anthracis and is based on a comparison of the minimal inhibitory concentrations determined for each drug to the susceptibility breakpoints published in the Clinical Laboratory Standards Institute M45 document. Ciprofloxacin is the recommended treatment for respiratory anthrax, but studies have shown that a newer fluoroquinolone, gatifloxacin, can increase the survival of mice susceptible to the Ames strain.

The Sterne strain, like all Bacillus anthracis strains, has two functional 𝛃-lactamases, but gene expression is usually not sufficient to allow drug resistance. The Sterne strain acts as a good comparison to other anthrax strains, as it is a prototypical and easy to work with strain, with sensitivity to penicillin.

== Anthrax vaccines ==
=== Vaccine development using attenuated strains ===
Virulence can usually be reduced by removing the virulence plasmids, and these attenuated strains can be used to make vaccines against B. anthracis. If either the pXO1 or pXO2 plasmid is missing, the strain cannot produce all of the virulence factors, and is considered attenuated. The Sterne strain naturally lacks a pXO2 plasmid; thus, it is attenuated and can be safely used to generate an immune response. To create attenuated strains, the virulence plasmid pXO1 is usually removed, but the Ames strain can still be virulent in mouse models if the pXO1 plasmid is removed, but the pXO2 plasmid remains.

Anthrax vaccines are used for both livestock and human immunization. One of the most used anthrax vaccines today is based on the Sterne strain, in the form of a live-spore vaccine for animals. A vaccine with live spores is dangerous for humans, so vaccines based on the secreted toxin protein, protective antigen (PA), have been explored. However, PA vaccines are less protective than live-spore vaccines, and a PA-based vaccine against the Ames strain for humans has not been developed.

=== Existing anthrax vaccines ===
The only licensed human anthrax vaccine in America, Anthrax vaccine adsorbed (AVA), is based on protective antigen, and has varying success against Ames depending on the animal model. This inconsistency suggests that multiple model organisms must be studied when testing vaccines for human use. Currently, researchers are investigating a way to inactivate anthrax spores, such as with formaldehyde; this would provide an alternative to the live spore and PA vaccines.

== Strain tracking ==
The identification of strain-specific single-nucleotide polymorphisms (SNPs) in the Ames strain allows for the development of diagnostic tests that can help track outbreaks. SNPs can define specific genetic groups, and are therefore important for detecting and subtyping bacterial pathogens. Six SNPs are identified as highly specific and are seen only in the Ames strain; there are four on the chromosome, one on the pXO1 plasmid and one on the pXO2 plasmid. Any of the six SNPs can differentiate the Ames strain from the other 88 B. anthracis strains. However, one of the SNPs has less discriminatory power against strains that are closely related to Ames.

Using Ames strain-specific SNPs and real-time PCR, investigators can either confirm or disconfirm thousands of samples as the Ames strain. The stability of these SNPs as diagnostic markers results from the low mutation rates in the DNA of B. anthracis. The lack of these mutational events limits the likelihood of observing a false positive in these assays, as the strain is unlikely to mutate to a novel or ancestral state. Additionally, anthrax has this reduced genetic variability because its spores can remain dormant for an extended period of time, and should not accumulate genetic mutations as they remain inactive. Thus, the stable nature of the Ames strain allows researchers to look for small genetic variations and connect them to a source sample. The approach of using strain-specific SNPs allows for highly specific strain identification that can be widely applied to other bioterror agents.
