= Artificial white blood cells =

Alternative method of immunotherapy

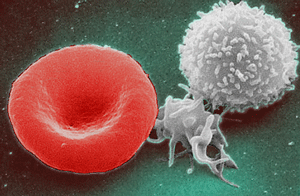
White Blood Cell (right)

Artificial white blood cells are typically membrane bound vesicles designed to mimic the immunomodulatory behavior of naturally produced leukocytes. While extensive research has been done with regards to artificial red blood cells and platelets for use in emergency blood transfusions, research into artificial white blood cells has been focused on increasing the immunogenic response within a host to treat cancer or deliver drugs in a more favorable fashion. While certain limitations have prevented leukocyte mimicking particles from becoming widely used and approved by regulatory bodies (e.g., US FDA, EU EMA, UK MHRA, JP PMDA, AU TGA), more research is being allocated to this area of synthetic blood which has the potential for producing a new form of treatment for cancer and other diseases.

== Leukocyte physiology ==
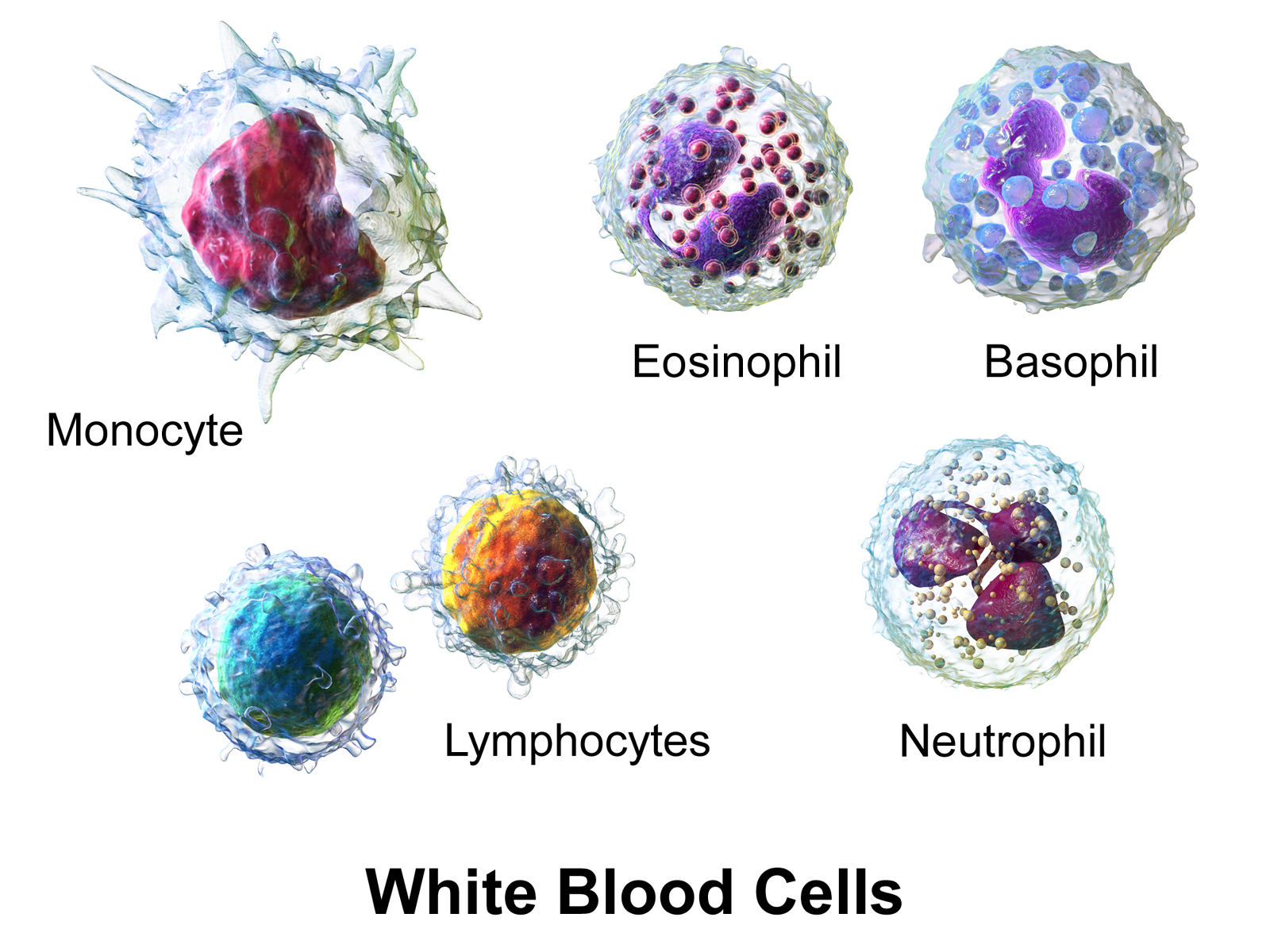
Some of the various kinds of leukocytes

Leukocytes, otherwise known as white blood cells (WBCs), come in various types and generally circulate around the body to facilitate warding off pathogenic invaders such as bacteria or viruses, as well as cells turned cancerous. They mainly circulate throughout the vasculature including capillary beds, bone marrow, and lymph vessels. The five major types of WBCs are neutrophils, eosinophils, basophils, monocytes, and lymphocytes. There exist leukocytes that do not circulate but instead remain in a particular tissue. These include histiocytes and dendritic cells. They typically range in size from 8 to 18 μm in diameter depending on cell type and stage in development. Leukocytes make up roughly 1% of the total blood cells in the average human body. Leukocytes maintain the expression of CD47 and CD45 biomarkers which indicate to other cells what they are and that they should not be destroyed. Cells like dendritic cells are involved in the innate immune system, whereas cells like lymphocytes are part of the active immune system.

=== Neutrophils ===
Through the mechanism of chemotaxis, neutrophils are typically found migrating toward sites of inflammation that are secreting heightened concentrations of inflammatory chemical signals. Once they arrived at the site of inflammation, they release cytokines to activate other types of leukocytes. The distinct chemotaxis behavior of neutrophils allows for localized targeting of cancer sites using manipulated neutrophils. Neutrophils are the first to fend off pathogens and achieve such through phagocytosis, degranulation, and extracellular traps.

=== Eosinophils ===
Eosinophils are weaker than neutrophils at performing phagocytosis and effectively diminishing infectious pathogen populations. However, they excel at targeting and eliminating certain parasitic organisms through release of granules containing toxic proteins, including RNAases which are effective against viruses.

=== Basophils ===
Primarily involved in allergic reactions, basophils release granules containing heparin, histamine, and proteolytic enzymes. They possess similar anti-parasitic properties to eosinophils, as well as exhibit regulatory functions of T-cells and control the degree to which other immune cells are activated.

=== Monocytes ===
Once monocytes enter the region containing pathogens, they differentiate into macrophages that eliminate certain pathogens through phagocytosis. They serve a key role in presenting antigens to T-cells which produce immune system alerting signals upon coming into contact with said antigens.

=== Lymphocytes ===
Lymphocytes can be further divided into three main types. These include B-cells, T-cells, and natural killer (NK) cells. B-cells become activated and produce antibodies to bind and tag unwanted antigens for destruction and digestion. Once activated, they immediately begin producing antibodies for urgent action, or they circulate around the body as memory B cells to serve as protection against a particular antigen for long periods of time. T-cells have several key functions, including activation of other cells such as B-cells, helper T-cells and CD4+ cells, as well as elimination of virally infected cells and cancer cells. NK cells are involved in the innate immune system, and they kill pathogens via release of perforin and granzyme to directly destroy cell membranes, release of cytokines such as TNF-α to boost activity of other WBCs, as well as secretion of signals that trigger apoptosis. NK cells also can act to destroy pathogens without prior stimulation, unlike T-Cells.

=== Macrophages ===
Macrophages are white blood cells that act fast to swallow up and break down anything the body sees as a threat—bacteria, viruses, or even foreign objects—clearing them out to maintain health. A macrophage does not go after something it does not recognize as dangerous.

== History ==
Research into artificial WBCs began around the time as artificial red blood cells as an effort to address the lack of whole blood donations available for emergencies. The artificial WBCs developed since the 2000s have less to do with reproducing exact replicas of immune cells with their every feature, and more to do with creating simple vesicle-like particles the size of actual immune cells that are capable of performing tasks and mimicking the physiological features of biological immune cells to an efficacious degree. The main mechanisms in particular that are commonly mimicked in artificial WBCs are the release of cytotoxic compounds and ability to perform phagocytosis.

== Current advancements ==
=== Leukosomes ===
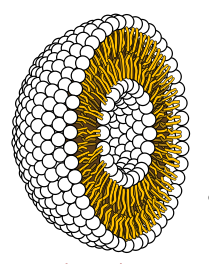
A leukosome devoid of surface proteins and structures, otherwise known as a liposome

Leukosomes are lipid bilayer vesicles with embedded proteins that are found in the membranes of naturally produced leukocytes. Leukosome particles exhibit similar mechanical and physiological qualities to leukocytes while also benefiting from the advantages of liposomal manufacturing and therapeutic administration. Leukosomes were shown to preferentially target inflamed endothelial tissue both in vitro and in vivo. They are typically manufactured by harvesting immune cells from an organism, most often mice, and disposing of all native components except the plasma membrane. Once the plasma membrane is isolated, it is enriched with proteins to give the particle a similar composition to the desired subject's leukocytes, and loaded with therapeutic membrane soluble compounds such as glucocorticoids that exhibit anti-inflammatory qualities. When loaded with dexamethasone, the leukosomes were able to accumulate in sites of inflammation and reduce expression of pro-inflammatory markers. Other studies found that leukosomes decrease expression of pro-inflammatory genes while increasing expression of anti-inflammatory genes, exhibiting promise as a treatment method for inflammatory diseases. In one study, leukosomes loaded with doxorubicin injected into murine models inhibited breast and melanoma tumor growth more effectively than dissolved circulating doxorubicin. Another study examined the differences in therapeutic behavior between liposomes and leukosomes both loaded with doxorubicin and found that unlike liposomes the loaded leukosomes better incorporated themselves into surrounding cells in vitro and served as an effective drug depot for the doxorubicin.

=== Leukopolymersomes ===
Image of polymersomes (red)

Leukopolymersomes are polymer block-based nanoparticles that excel at mimicking the adhesive qualities of leukocytes, specifically the binding of selectins and integrins found in native leukocytes. Polymersomes are typically made of biodegradable polymers such as poly(lactide), PCL, PTMC, poly(L-glutamic acid) and dextran. Unlike lipid nanoparticles which can only take on a spherical shape, polymersomes can be formed into various shapes such as discs, ellipsoids, and tubes. Methods such as thin film rehydration and direct injection result in polymersomes of variable sizes. Others such as polymerization induced self-assembly and flash nanoprecipitation are more consistent manufacturing methods with regards to size. These particles are more stable than phospholipid vesicles, featuring higher levels of strain before breakdown. This is particularly useful as it allows for adhesion at sites of inflammation where there are considerable shear forces. The thicker membranes and arrangement of hydrophobic chains of polymersomes greater stability and drug retention within the body. The surface of polymersomes is compatible with both covalent and non-covalent conjugation chemistry which can be used to target specific tissues and cellular surfaces. An early study from 2003 developed a method for producing "PLGA microspheres" that can be loaded with anti-inflammatory drugs, adhere to sites of inflammation, and release the loaded drug via selectin and ligand chemistry. These in concept are early versions of polymersomes. Polymersomes can mimic antigen presenting cells when loaded with tumor antigens to elicit a stronger immunogenic response, effectively acting as nanovaccines. Leukopolymersomes have the potential to be used as treatment for inflammation and cancer.

=== Leukolike vectors ===
Leukolike vectors are a type of nanoparticles made of nanoporous silicon encapsulated by extracted native leukocyte membranes. These particles were among the first artificial white blood cells to be studied as a proof of concept of using cellular membranes to prolong circulation of nanoparticles throughout the blood. Studies have shown that leukolike vectors have a specific advantage in chemotherapy drug delivery to cancer. This is because leukolike vectors specifically have the potential to bind to tumor endothelium.

=== Nanoghosts ===
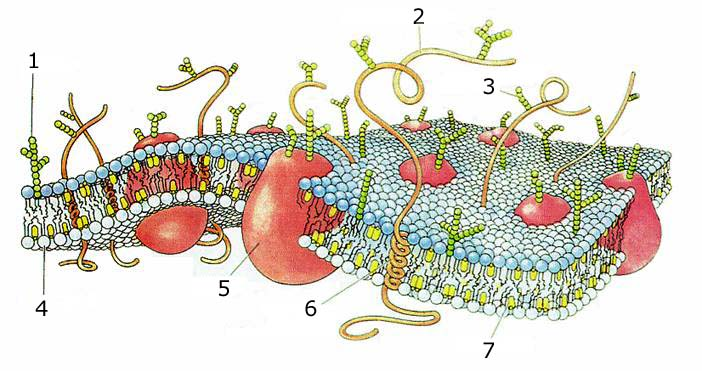
A theoretical image of an intact cellular membrane of a nanoghost nanoparticle, including the expressed surface proteins

Nanoghosts are nanosized vesicles containing a chosen drug delivery payload manufactured from extracted leukocyte membranes with the cell cytoplasm content removed. The use of biological membranes serves to mask the particles from the immune system to reduce the likelihood of an immunogenic response, as well as to extend circulation of the particles in the blood. They are produced by homogenizing the cells to remove the cytosol, and then sonicating the empty cell membranes to create nanoghosts between 100 and 200 nm in diameter. Membranes used to make nanoghosts harvested form red blood cells have been shown to circulate for about 120 days and avoid phagocytotic cells. Neutrophil based nanoghosts retain the chemotaxis capacity of neutrophils to sites of inflammation, which encourages tumor targeting. NK based nanoghosts exhibit metastatic cancer targeting behavior. Monocyte based nanoghosts are effective at infiltrating the tumor microenvironment. Mesenchymal stem cell derived nanoghosts exhibit cancer targeting properties.

=== Artificial antigen presenting cells ===
Artificial Antigen Presenting Cells (aAPCs) are polystyrene beads with stimulating receptor ligands. aAPCs loaded with cytokines have been found to stimulate T-cells to a higher degree than particles containing solely costimulatory ligands.

=== Engineered macrophages ===
According to Dooling, macrophages usually mistake cancer cells for normal body cells, so they leave them alone. To change that, researchers had to dig into the chemical signals that cells use to talk to each other. The breakthrough came when scientists figured out how to switch off a specific safety signal—an interaction between the SIRPa protein on macrophages and the CD47 protein on healthy cells—which opened the door to this new, potential, treatment.

== Limitations ==
The major limitation in the development of artificial WBCs is the translation of the technologies into clinical approval and use. Other limitations include the availability of technology necessary to produce artificial WBCs, variability in yield, and difficulties in purifying the particles necessary for standard clinical use. Some studies have also found that these particles may unintentionally target other tissues that are otherwise healthy. The delivery of the therapies faces some difficulties in that too rapid administration might cause systemic side effects, whereas a too slow release would be less effective. A major limitation to polymersomes is that a select number of polymers such as polyethylene glycol and poly(lactic-co-glycolic acid) are approved by the FDA for clinical use. Nanoghosts, or more generally membrane-coated nanoparticles, experience limitations in that cells will have varying degrees of proteins present in their membranes, creating variability and lack of stability in those products. There also is the risk that membrane proteins essential to the biomimetic function of the nanoghosts can become denatured in the manufacturing and storage process. Overall, more studies need to be done on these biomimetic solutions to verify efficacy and safety.
