= Anthim =

Anthim may refer to:

- Anthim the Iberian (1650–1716), Georgian theologian, scholar, calligrapher and philosopher
- Anthim I (1816–1888), Bulgarian education figure and clergyman
- Anthim, a brand name of the medication obiltoxaximab
