= Anthrax =

Infection caused by Bacillus anthracis bacteria

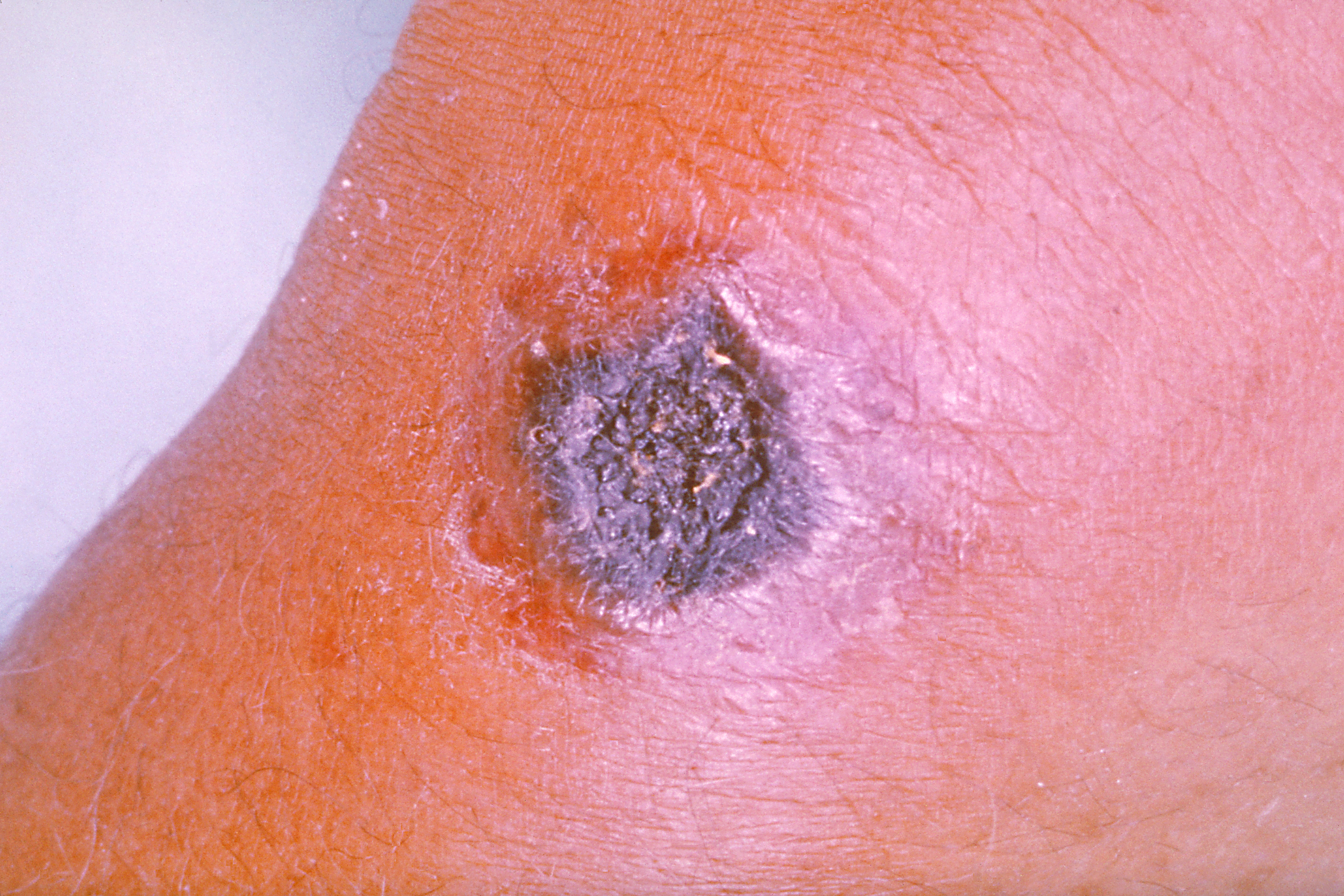
- A skin lesion with black eschar characteristic of anthrax
- Specialty: Infectious disease
- Symptoms: Skin form: small blister with surrounding swelling Inhalational form: fever, chest pain, shortness of breath Intestinal form: nausea, vomiting, diarrhea, abdominal pain Injection form: fever, abscess
- Usual onset: 1 day to 2 months post contact
- Causes: Bacillus anthracis
- Risk factors: Working with animals; travelers, postal workers, military personnel
- Diagnostic method: Based on antibodies or toxin in the blood, microbial culture
- Prevention: Anthrax vaccination, antibiotics
- Treatment: Antibiotics, antitoxin
- Prognosis: 20–80% die without treatment
- Frequency: >2,000 cases per year

Anthrax is an infection caused by the bacterium Bacillus anthracis or Bacillus cereus biovar anthracis. Infection typically occurs by contact with the skin, inhalation, or intestinal absorption. Symptom onset occurs between one day and two months after the infection is contracted. The skin form presents with a small blister with surrounding swelling that often turns into a painless ulcer with a black center. The inhalation form presents with fever, chest pain, and shortness of breath. The intestinal form presents with diarrhea (which may contain blood), abdominal pains, nausea, and vomiting.

According to the U.S. Centers for Disease Control and Prevention, the first clinical descriptions of cutaneous anthrax were given by Maret in 1752 and Fournier in 1769. Before that, anthrax had been described only in historical accounts. The German scientist Robert Koch was the first to identify Bacillus anthracis as the bacterium that causes anthrax.

Anthrax is spread by contact with the bacterium's spores, which often appear in infected animal products. Contact includes inhalation, eating, or through an area of broken skin. It does not typically spread directly between people. At risk populations include people who work with animals or animal products and military personnel. Diagnosis can be confirmed by finding antibodies or the toxin in the blood or by the culture of a sample from the infected site.

The anthrax vaccine is recommended for people at high risk of infection. Immunizing animals against anthrax is recommended in areas where previous infections have occurred. A two-month course of antibiotics such as ciprofloxacin, levofloxacin and doxycycline after exposure can also prevent infection. If infection occurs, treatment is with antibiotics and possibly antitoxin. The type and number of antibiotics used depend on the type of infection. An antitoxin is recommended for those with widespread infection.

A rare disease, human anthrax is most common in Africa and central and southern Asia. It occurs more regularly in Southern Europe than elsewhere on the continent and is uncommon in Northern Europe and North America. Globally, at least 2,000 cases occur a year, with about two cases a year in the United States. Skin infections represent more than 95% of cases. Without treatment the risk of death from skin anthrax is 23.7%. For intestinal infection the risk of death is 25 to 75%, while respiratory anthrax has a mortality of 50 to 80%, even with treatment. Until the 20th century, anthrax infections killed hundreds of thousands of people and animals each year. In herbivorous animals, infection occurs when they eat or breathe in the spores while grazing. Humans may become infected by killing and/or eating infected animals.

Several countries and non-state groups have developed anthrax as a weapon. It has been used in biowarfare and bioterrorism since 1916. Likely delivery methods of weaponized anthrax include aerial dispersal or dispersal through livestock. In World War II, it was developed and used by the Empire of Japan's Unit 731 against China, and researched by a British plan against Nazi Germany. The Soviet, United States, and Iraqi biological weapons program developed weaponized strains. In 1975, the Biological Weapons Convention prohibited the "development, production and stockpiling" of biological weapons. It has since been used in bioterrorism, including the 2001 anthrax attacks in the United States and an incident in 1993 by the Aum Shinrikyo group in Japan.

== Etymology ==
The English name comes from anthrax (ἄνθραξ), the Greek word for coal, possibly having Egyptian etymology, because of the characteristic black skin lesions people with a cutaneous anthrax infection develop. The central black eschar surrounded by vivid red skin has long been recognised as typical of the disease. The first recorded use of the word "anthrax" in English is in a 1398 translation of Bartholomaeus Anglicus's work De proprietatibus rerum (On the Properties of Things, 1240).

Anthrax was historically known by a wide variety of names, indicating its symptoms, location, and groups considered most vulnerable to infection. They include Siberian plague, Cumberland disease, charbon, splenic fever, malignant edema, woolsorter's disease and la maladie de Bradford.

== Signs and symptoms ==
=== Skin ===
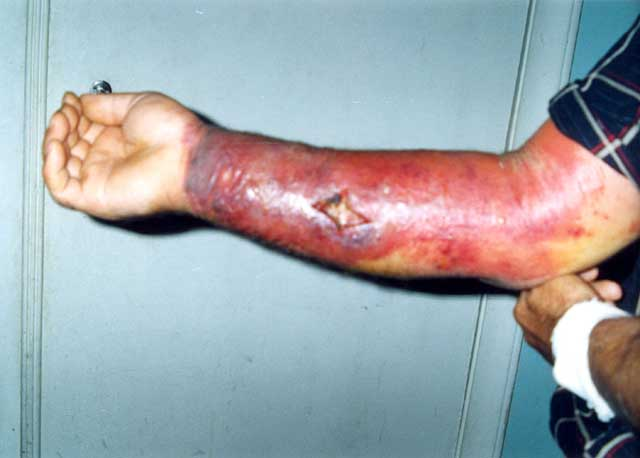
Skin lesion from anthrax

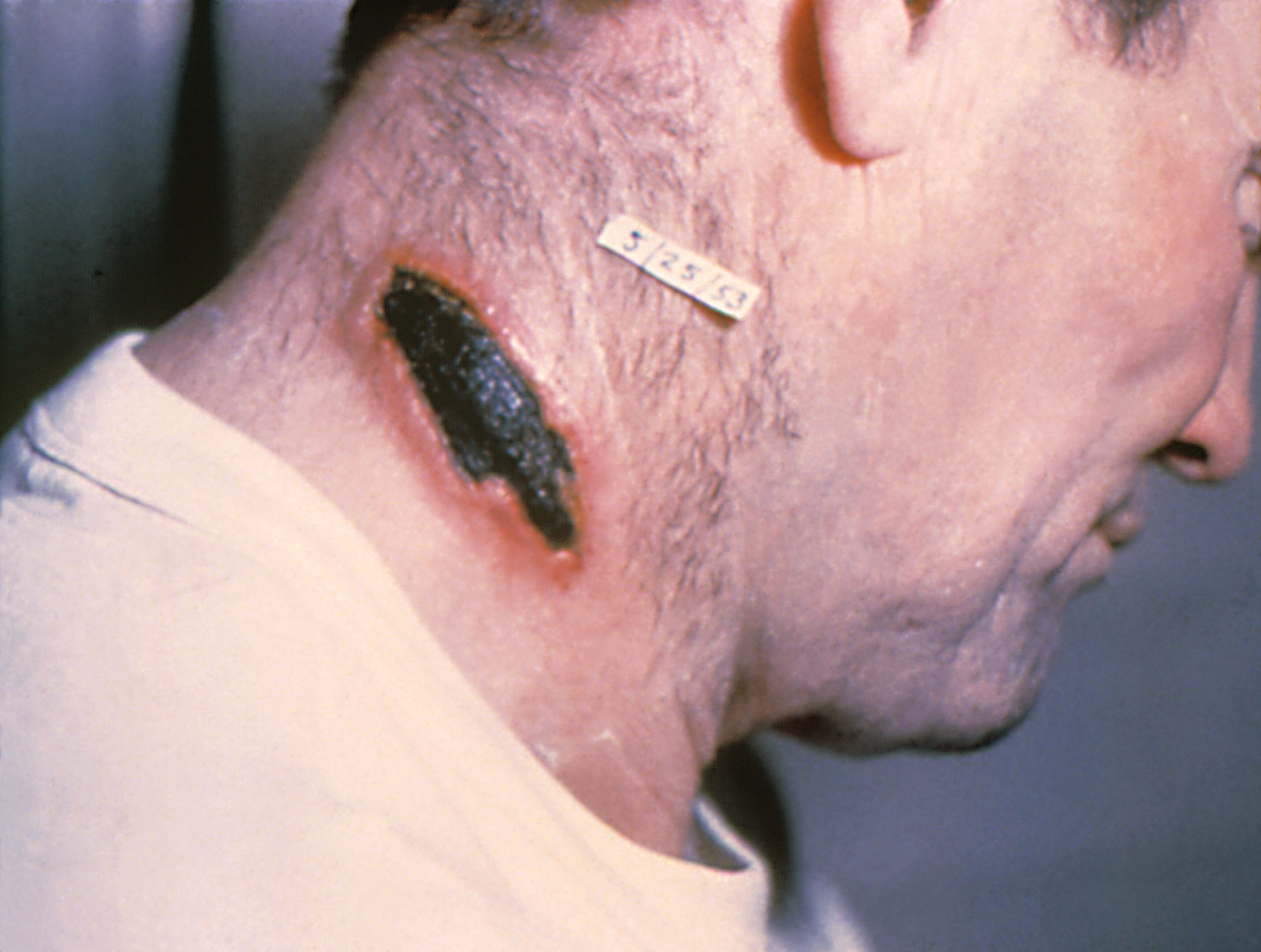
Anthrax skin lesion on the neck

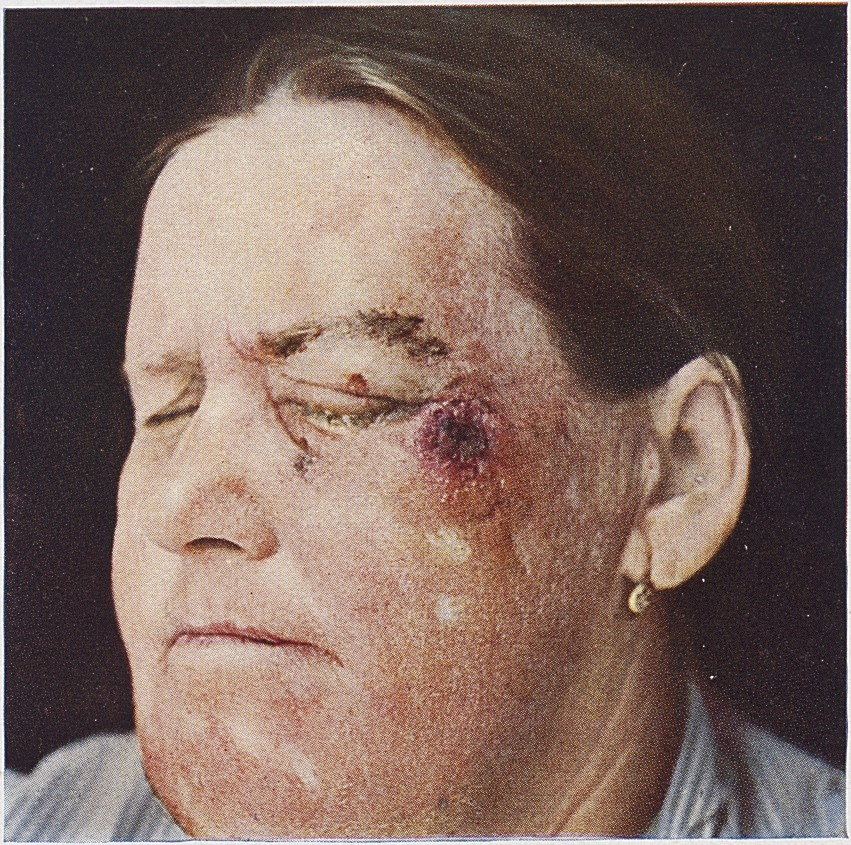
Anthrax skin lesion on the face

Cutaneous anthrax, also known as hide-porter's disease, is when anthrax occurs on the skin. It is the most common (>90% of cases) and least dangerous form (low mortality with treatment, 23.7% mortality without). Cutaneous anthrax presents as a boil-like skin lesion that eventually forms an ulcer with a black center (eschar). The black eschar often shows up as a large, painless, necrotic ulcer (beginning as an irritating and itchy skin lesion or blister that is dark and usually concentrated as a black dot, (somewhat resembling bread mold) at the site of infection. In general, cutaneous infections form within the site of spore penetration two to five days after exposure. Unlike bruises or most other lesions, cutaneous anthrax infections normally do not cause pain. Nearby lymph nodes may become infected, reddened, swollen, and painful. A scab forms over the lesion soon, and falls off in a few weeks. Complete recovery may take longer. Cutaneous anthrax is typically caused when B. anthracis spores enter through cuts on the skin. This form is found most commonly when humans handle infected animals and/or animal products.

=== Injection ===
In December 2009, an outbreak of anthrax occurred among injecting heroin users in the Glasgow and Stirling areas of Scotland, resulting in 14 deaths. It was the first documented non-occupational human anthrax outbreak in the UK since 1960. The source of the anthrax is believed to have been dilution of the heroin with bone meal in Afghanistan. Injected anthrax may have symptoms similar to cutaneous anthrax, with the exception of black areas, and may also cause infection deep into the muscle and spread faster. This can make it harder to recognise and treat.

=== Lungs ===
Inhalation anthrax usually develops within a week after exposure, but may take up to 2 months. During the first few days of illness, most people have fever, chills, and fatigue. These symptoms may be accompanied by cough, shortness of breath, chest pain, and nausea or vomiting, making inhalation anthrax difficult to distinguish from influenza and community-acquired pneumonia. This is often described as the prodromal period.

Over the next day or so, shortness of breath, cough, and chest pain become more common, and complaints not involving the chest such as nausea, vomiting, altered mental status, sweats, and headache develop in around one-third or more of people. Upper respiratory tract symptoms occur in only a quarter of people, and muscle pains are rare. Altered mental status or shortness of breath generally brings people to healthcare and marks the fulminant phase of illness.

It infects the lymph nodes in the chest first, rather than the lungs themselves, a condition called hemorrhagic mediastinitis, causing bloody fluid to accumulate in the chest cavity, thereby causing shortness of breath. The second (pneumonia) stage occurs when the infection spreads from the lymph nodes to the lungs. Symptoms of the second stage develop suddenly within hours or days after the first stage. Symptoms include high fever, extreme shortness of breath, shock, and rapid death within 48 hours in fatal cases.

=== Gastrointestinal ===
Gastrointestinal (GI) infection is most often caused by consuming anthrax-infected meat and is characterized by diarrhea, potentially with blood, abdominal pains, acute inflammation of the intestinal tract, and loss of appetite. Occasional vomiting of blood can occur. Lesions have been found in the intestines and in the mouth and throat. After the bacterium invades the gastrointestinal system, it spreads to the bloodstream and throughout the body, while continuing to make toxins.

== Cause ==
=== Bacteria ===
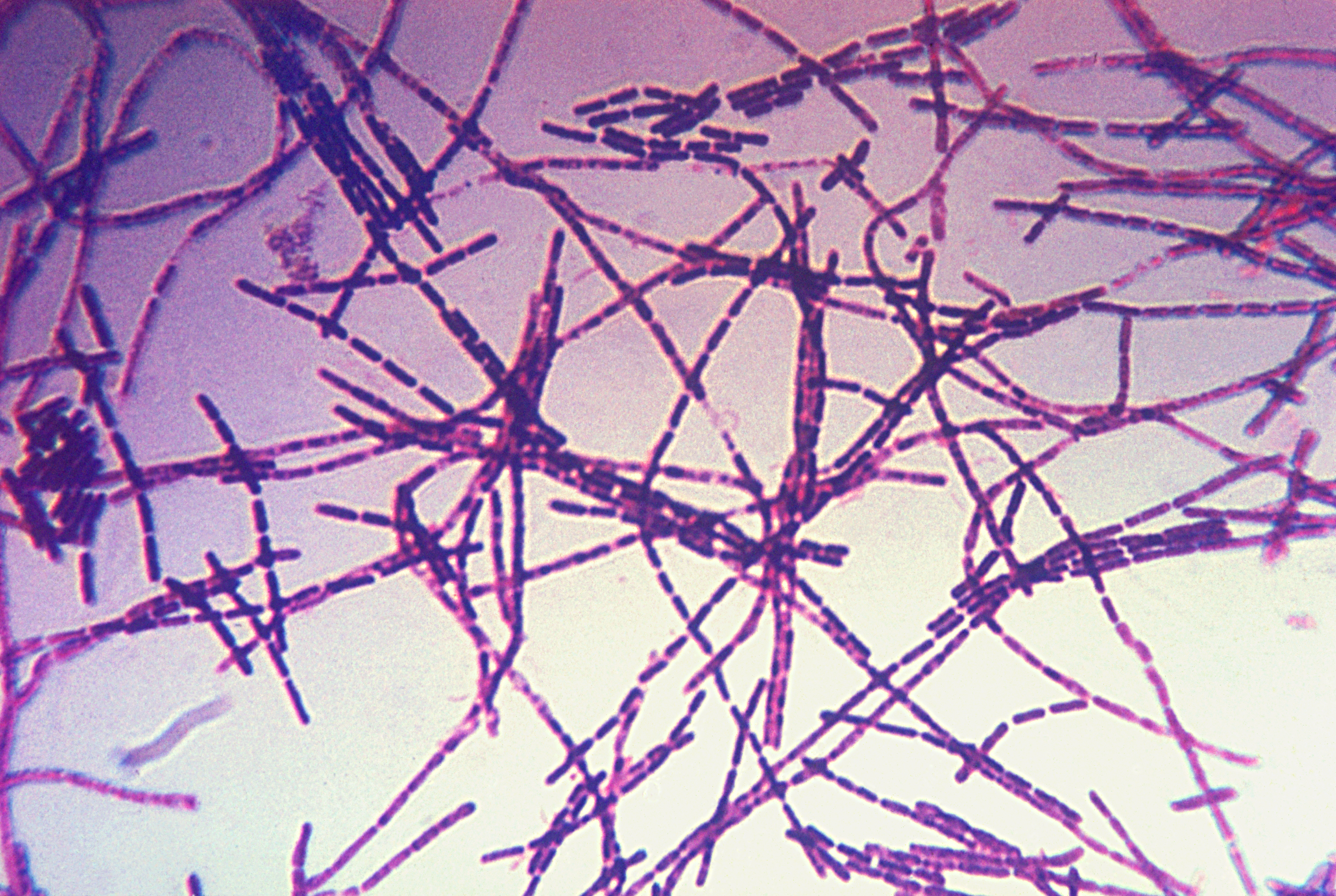
Photomicrograph of a Gram stain of the bacterium Bacillus anthracis, the cause of the anthrax disease

Bacillus anthracis is a rod-shaped, Gram-positive, facultative anaerobe bacterium about 1 by 9 μm in size. It was shown to cause disease by Robert Koch in 1876 when he took a blood sample from an infected cow, isolated the bacteria, and put them into a mouse. The bacterium normally rests in spore form in the soil, and can survive for decades in this state. Herbivores are often infected while grazing, especially when eating rough, irritant, or spiky vegetation; the vegetation has been hypothesized to cause wounds within the gastrointestinal tract, permitting entry of the bacterial spores into the tissues. Once ingested or placed in an open wound, the bacteria begin multiplying inside the animal or human and typically kill the host within a few days or weeks. The spores germinate at the site of entry into the tissues and then spread by the circulation to the lymphatics, where the bacteria multiply.

The production of two powerful exotoxins and lethal toxin by the bacteria causes death. Veterinarians can often tell a possible anthrax-induced death by its sudden occurrence and the dark, nonclotting blood that oozes from the body orifices. Most anthrax bacteria inside the body after death are outcompeted and destroyed by anaerobic bacteria within minutes to hours postmortem, but anthrax vegetative bacteria that escape the body via oozing blood or opening the carcass may form hardy spores. These vegetative bacteria are not contagious. One spore forms per vegetative bacterium. The triggers for spore formation are not known, but oxygen tension and lack of nutrients may play roles. Once formed, these spores are very hard to eradicate.

The infection of herbivores (and occasionally humans) by inhalation normally begins with inhaled spores being transported through the air passages into the tiny air sacs (alveoli) in the lungs. The spores are then picked up by scavenger cells (macrophages) in the lungs and transported through small vessels (lymphatics) to the lymph nodes in the central chest cavity (mediastinum). Damage caused by the anthrax spores and bacilli to the central chest cavity can cause chest pain and difficulty breathing. Once in the lymph nodes, the spores germinate into active bacilli that multiply and eventually burst the macrophages, releasing many more bacilli into the bloodstream to be transferred to the entire body. Once in the bloodstream, these bacilli release three proteins: lethal factor, edema factor, and protective antigen. The three are not toxic by themselves, but their combination is incredibly lethal to humans. Protective antigen combines with these other two factors to form lethal toxin and edema toxin, respectively. These toxins are the primary agents of tissue destruction, bleeding, and death of the host. If antibiotics are administered too late, even if the antibiotics eradicate the bacteria, some hosts still die of toxemia because the toxins produced by the bacilli remain in their systems at lethal dose levels.

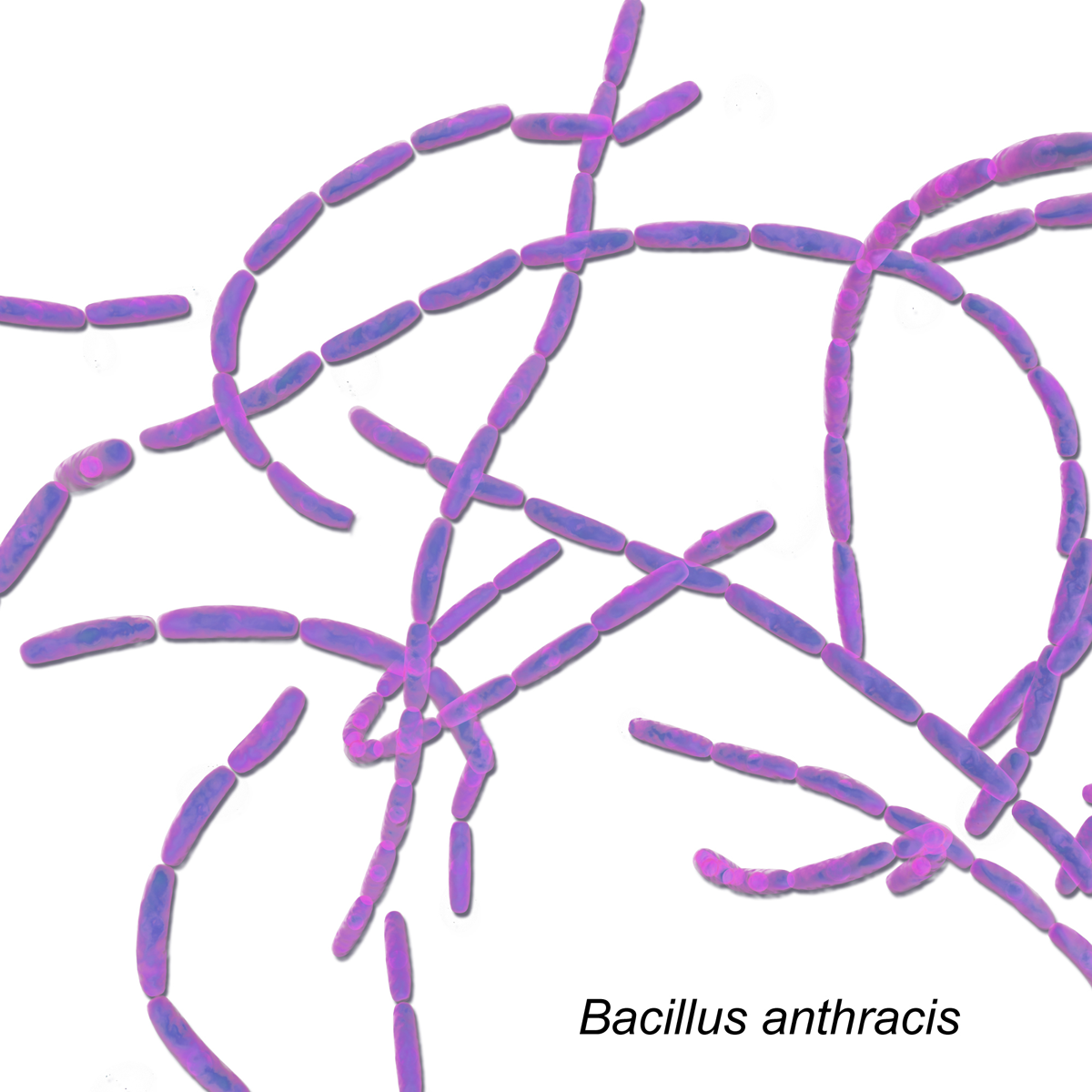
Bacillus anthracis

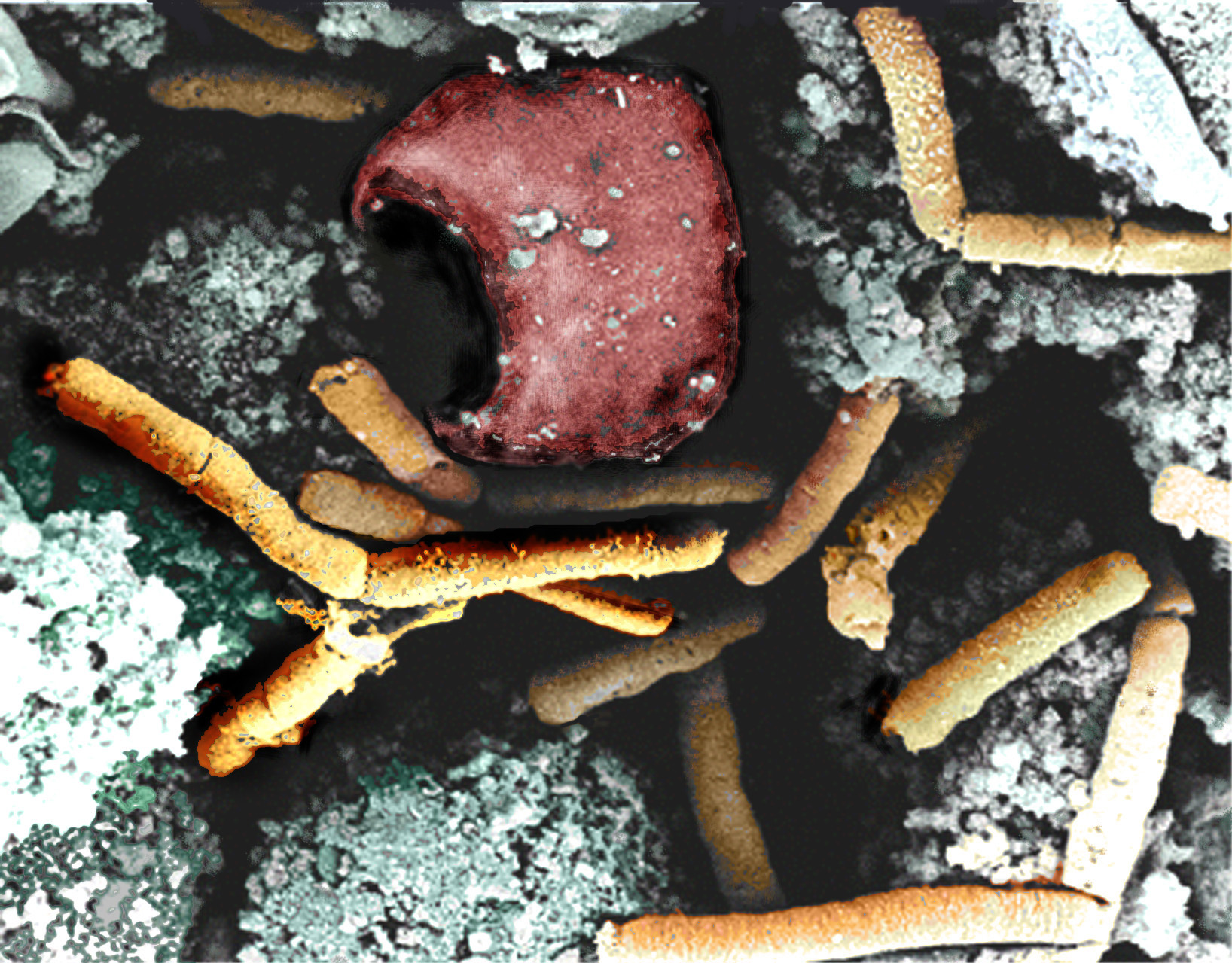
Color-enhanced scanning electron micrograph shows splenic tissue from a monkey with inhalational anthrax; featured are rod-shaped bacilli (yellow) and an erythrocyte (red)

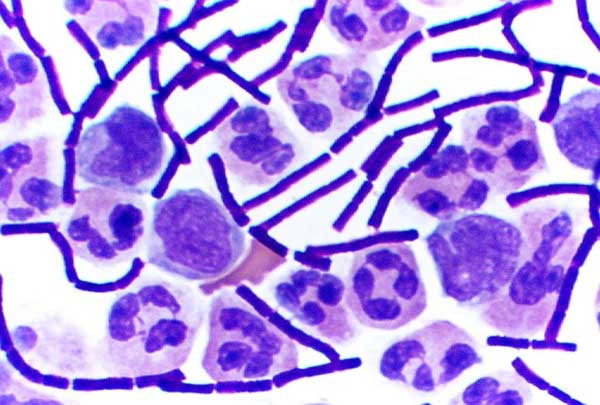
Gram-positive anthrax bacteria (purple rods) in cerebrospinal fluid: If present, a Gram-negative bacterial species would appear pink. (The other cells are white blood cells.)

=== Exposure and transmission ===
Anthrax can enter the human body through the intestines (gastrointestinal), lungs (pulmonary), or skin (cutaneous), and causes distinct clinical symptoms based on its site of entry. Anthrax does not usually spread from an infected human to an uninfected human. If the disease is fatal to the person's body, its mass of anthrax bacilli becomes a potential source of infection to others and special precautions should be used to prevent further contamination. Pulmonary anthrax, if left untreated, is almost always fatal. Historically, pulmonary anthrax was called woolsorters' disease because it was an occupational hazard for people who sorted wool. Today, this form of infection is extremely rare in industrialized nations. Cutaneous anthrax is the most common form of transmission but also the least dangerous of the three transmissions. Gastrointestinal anthrax is likely fatal if left untreated, but very rare.

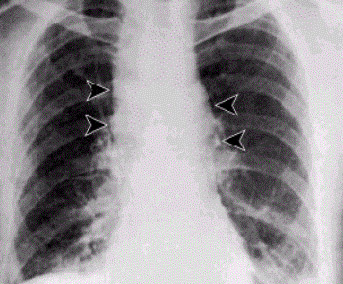
Inhalational anthrax, mediastinal widening

The spores of anthrax are able to survive in harsh conditions for decades or even centuries. Such spores can be found on all continents, including Antarctica. Disturbed grave sites of infected animals have been known to cause infection after 70 years. In one such event, a young boy died from gastrointestinal anthrax due to the thawing of reindeer corpses from 75 years before contact. Anthrax spores traveled through groundwater used for drinking and caused tens of people to be hospitalized, largely children. Occupational exposure to infected animals or their products (such as skin, wool, and meat) is the usual pathway of exposure for humans. Workers exposed to dead animals and animal products are at the highest risk, especially in countries where anthrax is more common. Anthrax in livestock grazing on open range where they mix with wild animals still occasionally occurs in the U.S. and elsewhere. In the US, metal working has been noted as a risk factor for a disease closely resembling anthrax.

Many workers who deal with wool and animal hides are routinely exposed to low levels of anthrax spores, but most exposure levels are not sufficient to produce infection. A lethal infection is reported to result from inhalation of about 10,000–20,000 spores, though this dose varies among host species.

== Mechanism ==
The lethality of the anthrax disease is due to the bacterium's two principal virulence factors: the poly-D-glutamic acid capsule, which protects the bacterium from phagocytosis by host neutrophils; and the tripartite protein toxin, called anthrax toxin, consisting of protective antigen (PA), edema factor (EF), and lethal factor (LF). PA plus LF produces lethal toxin, and PA plus EF produces edema toxin. These toxins cause death and tissue swelling (edema), respectively. To enter the cells, the edema and lethal factors use another protein produced by B. anthracis called protective antigen, which binds to two surface receptors on the host cell. A cell protease then cleaves PA into two fragments: PA_{20} and PA_{63}. PA_{20} dissociates into the extracellular medium, playing no further role in the toxic cycle. PA_{63} then oligomerizes with six other PA_{63} fragments forming a heptameric ring-shaped structure named a prepore. Once in this shape, the complex can competitively bind up to three EFs or LFs, forming a resistant complex. Receptor-mediated endocytosis occurs next, providing the newly formed toxic complex access to the interior of the host cell. The acidified environment within the endosome triggers the heptamer to release the LF and/or EF into the cytosol. It is unknown how exactly the complex results in the death of the cell.

Edema factor is a calmodulin-dependent adenylate cyclase. Adenylate cyclase catalyzes the conversion of ATP into cyclic AMP (cAMP) and pyrophosphate. The complexation of adenylate cyclase with calmodulin removes calmodulin from stimulating calcium-triggered signaling, thus inhibiting the immune response. To be specific, LF inactivates neutrophils (a type of phagocytic cell) by the process just described so they cannot phagocytose bacteria. Throughout history, lethal factor was presumed to cause macrophages to make TNF and interleukin 1 beta (IL1β). TNF is a cytokine whose primary role is to regulate immune cells, as well as to induce inflammation and apoptosis or programmed cell death. Interleukin 1 beta is another cytokine that also regulates inflammation and apoptosis. The overproduction of TNF and IL1β ultimately leads to septic shock and death. However, recent evidence indicates anthrax also targets endothelial cells that line serious cavities such as the pericardial cavity, pleural cavity, and peritoneal cavity, lymph vessels, and blood vessels, causing vascular leakage of fluid and cells, and ultimately hypovolemic shock and septic shock.

== Diagnosis ==
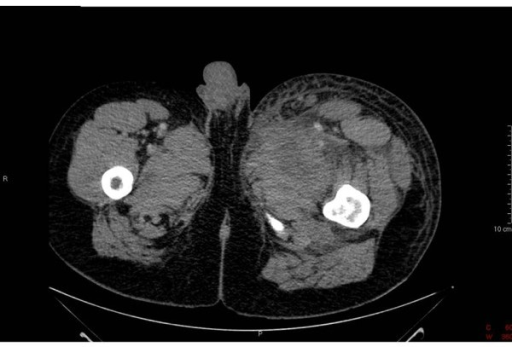
Possible edema and necrosis in a case of injection anthrax.

Various techniques may be used for the direct identification of B. anthracis in clinical material. Firstly, specimens may be Gram stained. Bacillus spp. are quite large in size (3 to 4 μm long), they may grow in long chains, and they stain Gram-positive. To confirm the organism is B. anthracis, rapid diagnostic techniques such as polymerase chain reaction-based assays and immunofluorescence microscopy may be used.

All Bacillus species grow well on 5% sheep blood agar and other routine culture media. Polymyxin-lysozyme-EDTA-thallous acetate can be used to isolate B. anthracis from contaminated specimens, and bicarbonate agar is used as an identification method to induce capsule formation. Bacillus spp. usually grow within 24 hours of incubation at 35 °C, in ambient air (room temperature) or in 5% CO_{2}. If bicarbonate agar is used for identification, then the medium must be incubated in 5% CO_{2}. B. anthracis colonies are medium-large, gray, flat, and irregular with swirling projections, often referred to as having a "medusa head" appearance, and are not hemolytic on 5% sheep blood agar. The bacteria are not motile, susceptible to penicillin, and produce a wide zone of lecithinase on egg yolk agar. Confirmatory testing to identify B. anthracis includes gamma bacteriophage testing, indirect hemagglutination, and enzyme-linked immunosorbent assay to detect antibodies. The best confirmatory precipitation test for anthrax is the Ascoli test.

== Prevention ==
Precautions are taken to avoid contact with the skin and any fluids exuded through natural body openings of a deceased body that is suspected of harboring anthrax. The body should be put in strict quarantine. A blood sample is collected and sealed in a container and analyzed in an approved laboratory to ascertain if anthrax is the cause of death. The body should be sealed in an airtight body bag and incinerated to prevent the transmission of anthrax spores. Microscopic visualization of the encapsulated bacilli, usually in very large numbers, in a blood smear stained with polychrome methylene blue (McFadyean stain) is fully diagnostic, though the culture of the organism is still the gold standard for diagnosis. Full isolation of the body is important to prevent possible contamination of others.

Protective, impermeable clothing and equipment such as rubber gloves, rubber apron, and rubber boots with no perforations are used when handling the body. No skin, especially if it has any wounds or scratches, should be exposed. Disposable personal protective equipment is preferable, but if not available, decontamination can be achieved by autoclaving. Used disposable equipment is burned and/or buried after use. All contaminated bedding or clothing is isolated in double plastic bags and treated as biohazard waste. Respiratory equipment capable of filtering small particles, such the US National Institute for Occupational Safety and Health- and Mine Safety and Health Administration-approved high-efficiency respirator, is worn. Addressing anthrax from a One Health perspective reduces risks of transmission and better protects both human and animal populations.

=== Vaccines ===
Vaccines against anthrax for use in livestock and humans have had a prominent place in the history of medicine. The French scientist Louis Pasteur developed the first effective veterinary vaccine in 1881. Human anthrax vaccines were developed by the Soviet Union in the late 1930s and in the US and UK in the 1950s. The current FDA-approved US vaccine was formulated in the 1960s.

Currently administered human anthrax vaccines include acellular subunit vaccine (United States) and live vaccine (Russia) varieties. All currently used anthrax vaccines show considerable local and general reactogenicity (erythema, induration, soreness, fever) and serious adverse reactions occur in about 1% of recipients. The American product, BioThrax, is licensed by the FDA and was formerly administered in a six-dose primary series at 0, 2, 4 weeks and 6, 12, 18 months, with annual boosters to maintain immunity. In 2008, the FDA approved omitting the week-2 dose, resulting in the currently recommended five-dose series. This five-dose series is available to military personnel, scientists who work with anthrax and members of the public who do jobs which cause them to be at-risk. New second-generation vaccines currently being researched include recombinant live vaccines and recombinant subunit vaccines. In the 20th century the use of a modern product (BioThrax) to protect American troops against the use of anthrax in biological warfare was controversial.

=== Antibiotics ===
Preventive antibiotics are recommended in those who have been exposed. Early detection of sources of anthrax infection can allow preventive measures to be taken. In response to the anthrax attacks of October 2001, the United States Postal Service (USPS) installed biodetection systems (BDSs) in its large-scale mail processing facilities. BDS response plans were formulated by the USPS in conjunction with local responders including fire, police, hospitals, and public health. Employees of these facilities have been educated about anthrax, response actions, and prophylactic medication. Because of the time delay inherent in getting final verification that anthrax has been used, prophylactic antibiotic treatment of possibly exposed personnel must be started as soon as possible.

== Treatment ==
Anthrax, and antibiotics

Anthrax cannot be spread from person to person, except in the rare case of skin exudates from cutaneous anthrax. However, a person's clothing and body may be contaminated with anthrax spores. Effective decontamination of people can be accomplished by a thorough wash-down with antimicrobial soap and water. Wastewater is treated with bleach or another antimicrobial agent. Effective decontamination of articles can be accomplished by boiling them in water for 30 minutes or longer. Chlorine bleach is ineffective in destroying spores and vegetative cells on surfaces, though formaldehyde is effective. Burning clothing is very effective in destroying spores. After decontamination, there is no need to immunize, treat, or isolate contacts of persons ill with anthrax unless they were also exposed to the same source of infection.

=== Antibiotics ===
Early antibiotic treatment of anthrax is essential; delay significantly lessens chances for survival. Treatment for anthrax infection and other bacterial infections includes large doses of intravenous and oral antibiotics, such as fluoroquinolones (ciprofloxacin), doxycycline, erythromycin, vancomycin, or penicillin. FDA-approved agents include ciprofloxacin, doxycycline, and penicillin. In possible cases of pulmonary anthrax, early antibiotic prophylaxis treatment is crucial to prevent possible death. Many attempts have been made to develop new drugs against anthrax, but existing drugs are effective if treatment is started soon enough.

=== Monoclonal antibodies ===
In May 2009, Human Genome Sciences submitted a biologic license application (BLA, permission to market) for its new drug, raxibacumab (brand name ABthrax) intended for emergency treatment of inhaled anthrax. On 14 December 2012, the US Food and Drug Administration approved raxibacumab injection to treat inhalational anthrax. Raxibacumab is a monoclonal antibody that neutralizes toxins produced by B. anthracis. In March 2016, FDA approved a second anthrax treatment using a monoclonal antibody which neutralizes the toxins produced by B. anthracis. Obiltoxaximab is approved to treat inhalational anthrax in conjunction with appropriate antibacterial drugs, and for prevention when alternative therapies are not available or appropriate.

=== Anthrax immune globulin ===
In 2015, anthrax immune globulin was approved by the FDA. It is a human immune globulin produced from the plasma of anthrax-vaccinated individuals. Its mechanism is distinct from monoclonal antibody treatments for anthrax, which inactivate the anthrax toxin. An immunizing agent, it increases the natural immune response against anthrax in vivo. Serious side effects include thrombosis, hemolysis, asceptic menengitis, TRALI, and anaphylaxis.

=== Biologic for drug-, antibody- or vaccine-resistant anthrax ===
Treatment of multi-drug resistant, antibody- or vaccine-resistant anthrax is also possible. Legler, et al. showed that pegylated CapD (capsule depolymerase) could provide protection against 5 LD50 exposures to lethal Ames spores without the use of antibiotics, monoclonal antibodies, or vaccines. The CapD enzyme removes the poly-D-glutamate (PDGA) capsular material from the bacteria, rendering it susceptible to the innate immune responses. The unencapsulated bacteria can then be cleared.

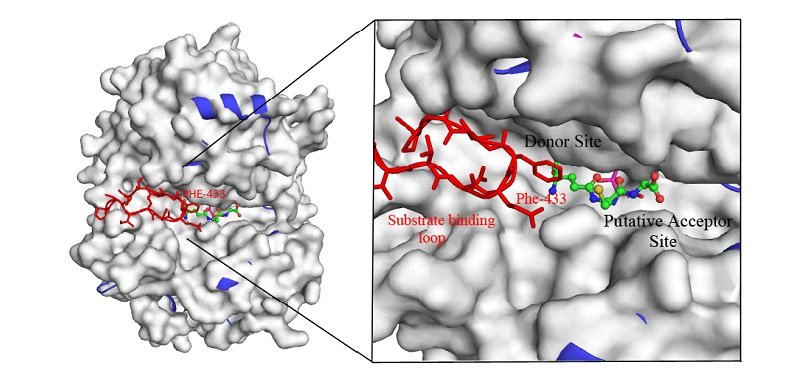
B. anthracis capsule depolymerase (CapD) degrades the unusual PDGA capsule on the outer surface of the bacterium. The pegylated enzyme has been used in mice to protect against five LD50 challenges of lethal Ames spores. The human enzyme (white surface) has been overlaid onto the bacterial CapD structure (PDB 3G9K, blue ribbon). In red is the substrate binding loop of HuGGT which CapD lacks. CapD binds polymers of D-glutamate. Original figure from Hu, Legler, et al. Figure has been provided with permission of the author.

== Prognosis ==
Cutaneous anthrax is rarely fatal if treated, because the infection area is limited to the skin, preventing the lethal factor, edema factor, and protective antigen from entering and destroying a vital organ. Without treatment, up to 20% of cutaneous skin infection cases progress to toxemia and death.

Before 2001, fatality rates for inhalation anthrax were 90%; since then, they have fallen to 45%. People that progress to the fulminant phase of inhalational anthrax nearly always die, with one case study showing a death rate of 97%. Anthrax meningoencephalitis is also nearly always fatal.

Gastrointestinal anthrax infections can be treated, but usually result in fatality rates of 25% to 60%, depending upon how soon treatment commences.

Injection anthrax is the rarest form of anthrax, and has only been seen to have occurred in a group of heroin injecting drug users.

== Epidemiology ==
Globally, at least 2,000 cases occur a year.

=== Croatia ===
In July 2022, dozens of cattle in a nature park in Lonjsko Polje, a flood plain by the Sava river, died of anthrax and 6 people have been hospitalized with light, skin-related symptoms.

=== United Kingdom ===
In November 2008, a drum maker in the United Kingdom who worked with untreated animal skins contracted and died from anthrax. In December 2009, an outbreak of anthrax occurred among heroin addicts in the Glasgow and Stirling areas of Scotland, resulting in 14 deaths. The source of the anthrax is believed to have been dilution of the heroin with bone meal in Afghanistan.

=== United States ===
The last fatal case of natural inhalational anthrax in the United States occurred in California in 1976, when a home weaver died after working with infected wool imported from Pakistan. To minimize the chance of spreading the disease, the body was transported to UCLA in a sealed plastic body bag within a sealed metal container for autopsy.

Gastrointestinal anthrax is exceedingly rare in the United States, with only two cases on record. The first case was reported in 1942, according to the Centers for Disease Control and Prevention (CDC). During December 2009, the New Hampshire Department of Health and Human Services confirmed a case of gastrointestinal anthrax in an adult female. The CDC investigated the source and the possibility that it was contracted from an African drum recently used by the woman taking part in a drum circle. The woman apparently inhaled anthrax, in spore form, from the hide of the drum. She became critically ill, but with gastrointestinal anthrax rather than inhaled anthrax, which made her unique in American medical history. The building where the infection took place was cleaned and reopened to the public and the woman recovered. The New Hampshire state epidemiologist, Jodie Dionne-Odom, stated "It is a mystery. We really don't know why it happened."

In 2007 two cases of cutaneous anthrax were reported in Danbury, Connecticut. The case involved a maker of traditional African-style drums who was working with a goat hide purchased from a dealer in New York City which had been previously cleared by Customs. While the hide was being scraped, a spider bite led to the spores entering the bloodstream. His son also became infected.

Several cases that have occurred since 1997 involve metalworkers, especially welders, leading to a 2022 study coining the term "Welder's Anthrax". The exact relationship between metalworking and anthrax is unknown, though the 2022 study by CDC researchers speculates that metal fumes from welding may have an immunosuppressive effect. The study also notes that B. Anthracis and B. cereus need iron to survive, and that welders may accrue excess iron in their lungs.

== History ==
=== Discovery ===
Robert Koch, a German physician and scientist, first identified the bacterium that caused the anthrax disease in 1875 in Wollstein (now Wolsztyn, Poland). His pioneering work in the late 19th century was one of the first demonstrations that diseases could be caused by microbes. In a groundbreaking series of experiments, he uncovered the lifecycle and means of transmission of anthrax. His experiments not only helped create an understanding of anthrax but also helped elucidate the role of microbes in causing illness at a time when debates still took place over spontaneous generation versus cell theory. Koch went on to study the mechanisms of other diseases and won the 1905 Nobel Prize in Physiology or Medicine for his discovery of the bacterium causing tuberculosis.

Although Koch arguably made the greatest theoretical contribution to understanding anthrax, other researchers were more concerned with the practical questions of how to prevent the disease. In Britain, where anthrax affected workers in the wool, worsted, hides, and tanning industries, it was viewed with fear. John Henry Bell, a doctor born and based in Bradford, first made the link between the mysterious and deadly "woolsorter's disease" and anthrax, showing in 1878 that they were one and the same. In the early 20th century, Friederich Wilhelm Eurich, the German bacteriologist who settled in Bradford with his family as a child, carried out important research for the local Anthrax Investigation Board. Eurich also made valuable contributions to a Home Office Departmental Committee of Inquiry, established in 1913 to address the continuing problem of industrial anthrax. His work in this capacity, much of it collaboration with the factory inspector G. Elmhirst Duckering, led directly to the Anthrax Prevention Act (1919).

=== First vaccination ===
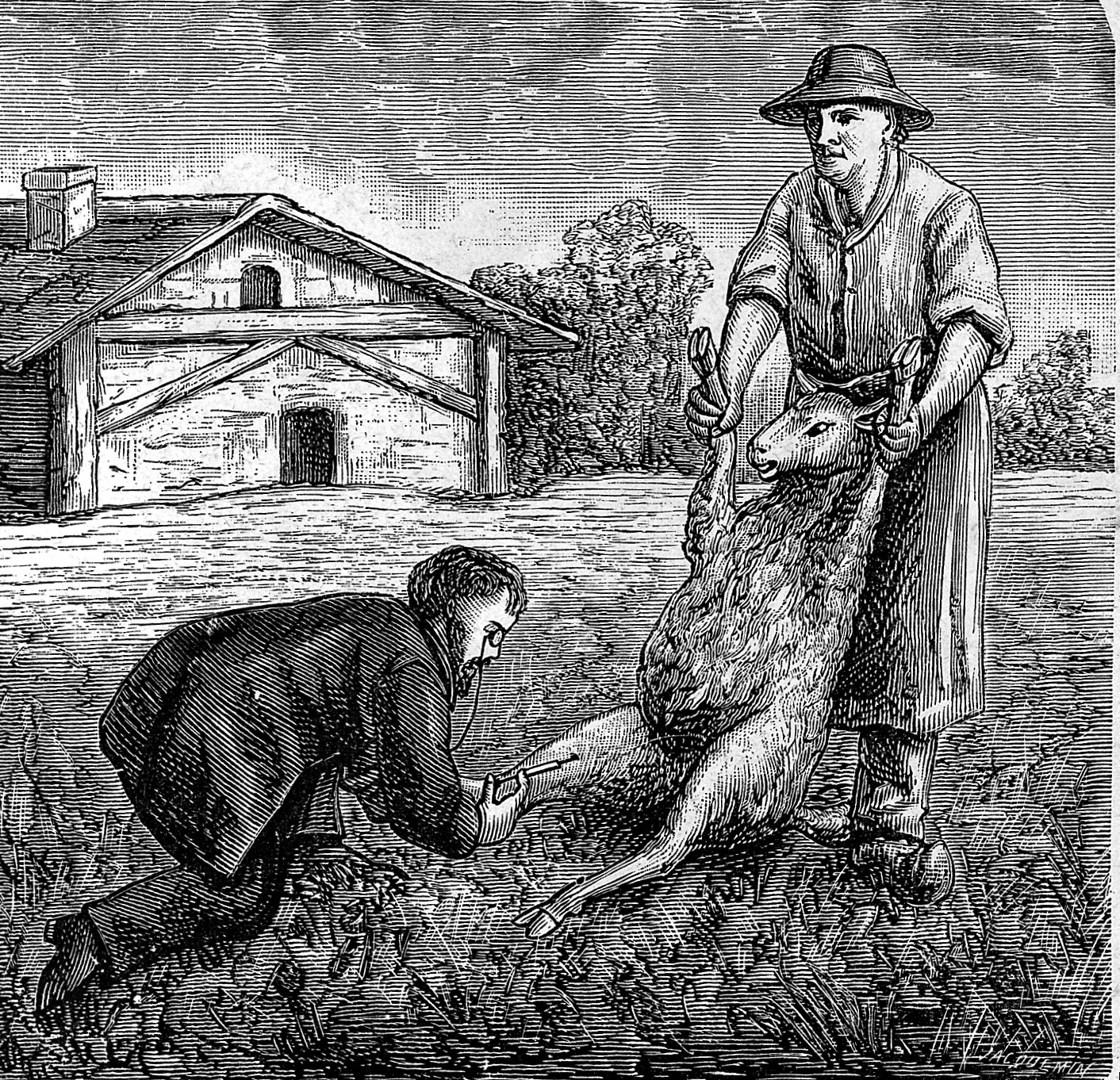
Louis Pasteur inoculating sheep against anthrax

Anthrax posed a major economic challenge in France and elsewhere during the 19th century. Horses, cattle, and sheep were particularly vulnerable, and national funds were set aside to investigate the production of a vaccine. French scientist Louis Pasteur was charged with the production of a vaccine, following his successful work in developing methods that helped to protect the important wine and silk industries.

In May 1881, Pasteur – in collaboration with his assistants Jean-Joseph Henri Toussaint, Émile Roux and others – performed a public experiment at Pouilly-le-Fort to demonstrate his concept of vaccination. He prepared two groups of 25 sheep, one goat, and several cattle. The animals of one group were twice injected with an anthrax vaccine prepared by Pasteur, at an interval of 15 days; the control group was left unvaccinated. Thirty days after the first injection, both groups were injected with a culture of live anthrax bacteria. All the animals in the unvaccinated group died, while all of the animals in the vaccinated group survived.

After this apparent triumph, which was widely reported in the local, national, and international press, Pasteur made strenuous efforts to export the vaccine beyond France. He used his celebrity status to establish Pasteur Institutes across Europe and Asia, and his nephew, Adrien Loir, travelled to Australia in 1888 to try to introduce the vaccine to combat anthrax in New South Wales. Ultimately, the vaccine was unsuccessful in the challenging climate of rural Australia, and it was soon superseded by a more robust version developed by local researchers John Gunn and John McGarvie Smith.

The human vaccine for anthrax became available in 1954. This was a cell-free vaccine instead of the live-cell Pasteur-style vaccine used for veterinary purposes. An improved cell-free vaccine became available in 1970.

=== Engineered strains ===
- The Sterne strain of anthrax, named after the Trieste-born immunologist Max Sterne, is an attenuated strain used as a vaccine, which contains only the anthrax toxin virulence plasmid and not the polyglutamic acid capsule expressing plasmid.
- Strain 836, created by the Soviet bioweapons program in the 1980s, was later called by the Los Angeles Times "the most virulent and vicious strain of anthrax known to man".
- The virulent Ames strain, which was used in the 2001 anthrax attacks in the United States, has received the most news coverage of any anthrax outbreak. The Ames strain contains two virulence plasmids, which separately encode for a three-protein toxin, called anthrax toxin, and a polyglutamic acid capsule.
- Nonetheless, the Vollum strain, developed but never used as a biological weapon during the Second World War, is much more dangerous. The Vollum (also incorrectly referred to as Vellum) strain was isolated in 1935 from a cow in Oxfordshire. This same strain was used during the Gruinard bioweapons trials. A variation of Vollum, known as "Vollum 1B", was used during the 1960s in the US and UK bioweapon programs. Vollum 1B is widely believed to have been isolated from William A. Boyles, a 46-year-old scientist at the US Army Biological Warfare Laboratories at Camp (later Fort) Detrick, Maryland, who died in 1951 after being accidentally infected with the Vollum strain.

== Society and culture ==
=== Site cleanup ===
Anthrax spores can survive for very long periods of time in the environment after release. Chemical methods for cleaning anthrax-contaminated sites or materials may use oxidizing agents such as peroxides, ethylene oxide, Sandia Foam, chlorine dioxide (used in the Hart Senate Office Building), peracetic acid, ozone gas, hypochlorous acid, sodium persulfate, and liquid bleach products containing sodium hypochlorite. Nonoxidizing agents shown to be effective for anthrax decontamination include methyl bromide, formaldehyde, and metam sodium. These agents destroy bacterial spores. All of the aforementioned anthrax decontamination technologies have been demonstrated to be effective in laboratory tests conducted by the US EPA or others.

Decontamination techniques for Bacillus anthracis spores are affected by the material with which the spores are associated, environmental factors such as temperature and humidity, and microbiological factors such as the spore species, anthracis strain, and test methods used.

A bleach solution for treating hard surfaces has been approved by the EPA. Chlorine dioxide has emerged as the preferred biocide against anthrax-contaminated sites, having been employed in the treatment of numerous government buildings over the past decade. Its chief drawback is the need for in situ processes to have the reactant on demand.

To speed the process, trace amounts of a nontoxic catalyst composed of iron and tetroamido macrocyclic ligands are combined with sodium carbonate and bicarbonate and converted into a spray. The spray formula is applied to an infested area and is followed by another spray containing tert-butyl hydroperoxide.

Using the catalyst method, complete destruction of all anthrax spores can be achieved in under 30 minutes. A standard catalyst-free spray destroys fewer than half the spores in the same amount of time.

Cleanups at a Senate Office Building, several contaminated postal facilities, and other US government and private office buildings, a collaborative effort headed by the Environmental Protection Agency showed decontamination to be possible, but time-consuming and costly. Clearing the Senate Office Building of anthrax spores cost $27 million, according to the Government Accountability Office. Cleaning the Brentwood postal facility in Washington cost $130 million and took 26 months. Since then, newer and less costly methods have been developed.

Cleanup of anthrax-contaminated areas on ranches and in the wild is much more problematic. Carcasses may be burned, though often 3 days are needed to burn a large carcass and this is not feasible in areas with little wood. Carcasses may also be buried, though the burying of large animals deeply enough to prevent resurfacing of spores requires much manpower and expensive tools. Carcasses have been soaked in formaldehyde to kill spores, though this has environmental contamination issues. Block burning of vegetation in large areas enclosing an anthrax outbreak has been tried; this, while environmentally destructive, causes healthy animals to move away from an area with carcasses in search of fresh grass. Some wildlife workers have experimented with covering fresh anthrax carcasses with shadecloth and heavy objects. This prevents some scavengers from opening the carcasses, thus allowing the putrefactive bacteria within the carcass to kill the vegetative B. anthracis cells and preventing sporulation. This method also has drawbacks, as scavengers such as hyenas are capable of infiltrating almost any enclosure.

The experimental site at Gruinard Island is said to have been decontaminated with a mixture of formaldehyde and seawater by the Ministry of Defence. It is not clear whether similar treatments had been applied to US test sites.

=== Biological warfare ===
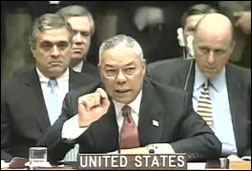
Colin Powell giving a presentation to the United Nations Security Council, holding a model vial of supposed weaponized anthrax

Anthrax spores have been used as a biological warfare weapon. Its first modern incidence occurred when Nordic rebels, supplied by the German General Staff, used anthrax with unknown results against the Imperial Russian Army in Finland in 1916. Anthrax was first tested as a biological warfare agent by Unit 731 of the Japanese Kwantung Army in Manchuria during the 1930s; some of this testing involved intentional infection of prisoners of war, thousands of whom died. Anthrax, designated at the time as Agent N, was also investigated by the Allies in the 1940s.

In 1942, British scientists at Porton Down began research on Operation Vegetarian, an ultimately unused biowarfare military operation plan which called for animal feed pellets containing linseed infected with anthrax spores of the Vollum-14578 strain to be dropped by air over the countryside of Nazi Germany. The pellets would be eaten by cattle, which would in turn be eaten by the human population and as such severely disrupt the German war effort. In the same year, bioweapons tests were carried out on the uninhabited Gruinard Island in the Scottish Highlands, with Porton Down scientists studying the effect of anthrax on the island's population of sheep. Ultimately, five million pellets were created, though plans to drop them over Germany using Royal Air Force bombers in 1944 were scrapped after the success of Operation Overlord and the subsequent Allied liberation of France. All pellets were destroyed using incinerators in 1945.

Weaponized anthrax was part of the US stockpile prior to 1972, when the United States signed the Biological Weapons Convention. President Nixon ordered the dismantling of US biowarfare programs in 1969 and the destruction of all existing stockpiles of bioweapons. In 1978–79, the Rhodesian government used anthrax against cattle and humans during its campaign against rebels. The Soviet Union created and stored 100 to 200 tons of anthrax spores at Kantubek on Vozrozhdeniya Island; they were abandoned in 1992 and destroyed in 2002.

American military and British Army personnel are no longer routinely vaccinated against anthrax prior to active service in places where biological attacks are considered a threat.

==== Sverdlovsk incident (2 April 1979) ====
Despite signing the 1972 agreement to end bioweapon production, the government of the Soviet Union had an active bioweapons program that included the production of hundreds of tons of anthrax after this period. On 2 April 1979, some of the over one million people living in Sverdlovsk (now called Ekaterinburg, Russia), about 1,370 kilometres (850 mi) east of Moscow, were exposed to an accidental release of anthrax from a biological weapons complex located near there. At least 94 people were infected, of whom at least 68 died. One victim died four days after the release, 10 over an eight-day period at the peak of the deaths, and the last six weeks later. Extensive cleanup, vaccinations, and medical interventions managed to save about 30 of the victims. Extensive cover-ups and destruction of records by the KGB continued from 1979 until Russian president Boris Yeltsin admitted this anthrax accident in 1992. Jeanne Guillemin reported in 1999 that a combined Russian and United States team investigated the accident in 1992.

Nearly all of the night-shift workers of a ceramics plant directly across the street from the biological facility (compound 19) became infected, and most died. Since most were men, some NATO governments suspected the Soviet Union had developed a sex-specific weapon. The government blamed the outbreak on the consumption of anthrax-tainted meat, and ordered the confiscation of all uninspected meat that entered the city. They also ordered all stray dogs to be shot and people not have contact with sick animals. Also, a voluntary evacuation and anthrax vaccination program was established for people from 18 to 55.

To support the cover-up story, Soviet medical and legal journals published articles about an outbreak in livestock that caused gastrointestinal anthrax in people having consumed infected meat, and cutaneous anthrax in people having come into contact with the animals. All medical and public health records were confiscated by the KGB. In addition to the medical problems the outbreak caused, it also prompted Western countries to be more suspicious of a covert Soviet bioweapons program and to increase their surveillance of suspected sites. In 1986, the US government was allowed to investigate the incident, and concluded the exposure was from aerosol anthrax from a military weapons facility. In 1992, President Yeltsin admitted he was "absolutely certain" that "rumors" about the Soviet Union violating the 1972 Bioweapons Treaty were true. The Soviet Union, like the US and UK, had agreed to submit information to the UN about their bioweapons programs, but omitted known facilities and never acknowledged their weapons program.

==== Anthrax bioterrorism ====
In theory, anthrax spores can be cultivated with minimal special equipment and a first-year collegiate microbiological education. In practice, however, the process requires extensive training and highly advanced equipment to prevent lethal self-contamination and to successfully aerosolize the pathogen.

Concentrated anthrax spores were used for bioterrorism in the 2001 anthrax attacks in the United States, delivered by mailing postal letters containing the spores. The letters were sent to several news media offices and two Democratic senators: Tom Daschle of South Dakota and Patrick Leahy of Vermont. As a result, 22 were infected and five died. Only a few grams of material were used in these attacks and in August 2008, the US Department of Justice announced they believed that Bruce Ivins, a senior biodefense researcher employed by the United States government, was responsible. These events also spawned many anthrax hoaxes.

Due to these events, the US Postal Service installed biohazard detection systems at its major distribution centers to actively scan for anthrax being transported through the mail. As of 2020, no positive alerts by these systems have occurred.

==== Decontaminating mail ====
In response to the postal anthrax attacks and hoaxes, the United States Postal Service sterilized some mail using gamma irradiation and treatment with a proprietary enzyme formula supplied by Sipco Industries.

A scientific experiment performed by a high school student, later published in the Journal of Medical Toxicology, suggested a domestic electric iron at its hottest setting (at least 400 °F (204 °C)) used for at least 5 minutes should destroy all anthrax spores in a common postal envelope.

== Other animals ==
Anthrax primarily affects herbivores such as cattle, sheep, and goats, but a wide range of mammals and birds can also be susceptible. Infection typically occurs through the ingestion of spores in contaminated soil or plants. Once inside the host, the spores transform into active bacteria, producing lethal toxins that lead to severe symptoms. Infected animals often exhibit high fever, rapid breathing, and convulsions, and they may succumb to the disease within hours to days. The presence of anthrax can pose significant challenges to livestock management and wildlife conservation efforts, making it a critical concern for both animal health and public health, as it can occasionally be transmitted to humans through contact with infected animals or contaminated products. Infected animals may stagger, have difficulty breathing, tremble, and finally collapse and die within a few hours.

Anthrax is especially rare in dogs and cats, as is evidenced by a single reported case in the United States in 2001. Anthrax outbreaks occur in some wild animal populations with some regularity.

In 2011 Russian researchers estimated that around 1.5 million anthrax-infected reindeer carcasses were frozen in arctic permafrost, and the spores would survive in the permafrost for 105 years. A risk exists that global warming in the Arctic can thaw the permafrost, releasing anthrax spores in the carcasses. In 2016, an anthrax outbreak in reindeer was linked to a 75-year-old carcass that defrosted during a heat wave.

In 2026, at least 30 hippopotamuses died in an outbreak in the Democratic Republic of the Congo.
