= Aloys Pollender =

German physician

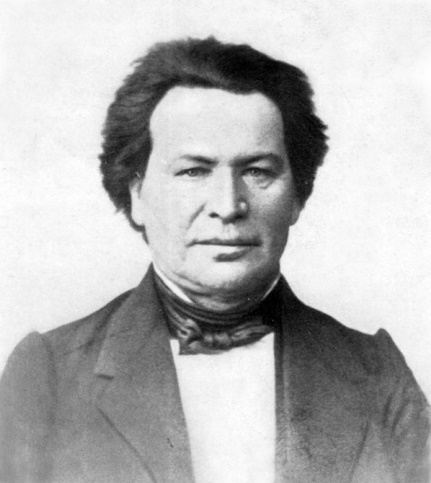
Aloys Pollender.

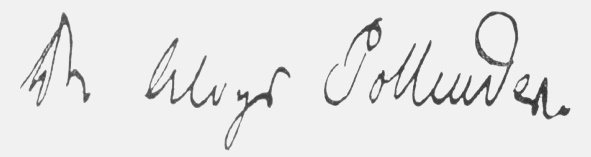
Signature.

Franz Anton Aloys Pollender (26 January 1799 – 17 August 1879) was a German medical doctor who is credited with the discovery of the etiology of anthrax. His work was along similar lines to his contemporaries, Pierre François Olive Rayer and Casimir Davaine.

Pollendner was born in Barmen, Germany; he also died there.

He published several science papers and books across five decades.
