= Bacillus cereus biovar anthracis =

Scientific classification
- Domain: Bacteria
- Kingdom: Bacillati
- Phylum: Bacillota
- Class: Bacilli
- Order: Bacillales
- Family: Bacillaceae
- Genus: Bacillus
- Species: B. cereus
- biovar: B. c. biovar anthracis

Trionomial name
- Bacillus cereus biovar anthracis

Bacterial variant

Bacillus cereus biovar anthracis is a variant of the Bacillus cereus bacterium that has acquired plasmids similar to those of Bacillus anthracis. As a result, it is capable of causing anthrax. In 2016, it was added to the CDC's list of select agents and toxins.

Bacillus cereus biovar anthracis infection has caused significant mortality in numerous mammalian species, including chimpanzees.

== See also ==
- Biovar
