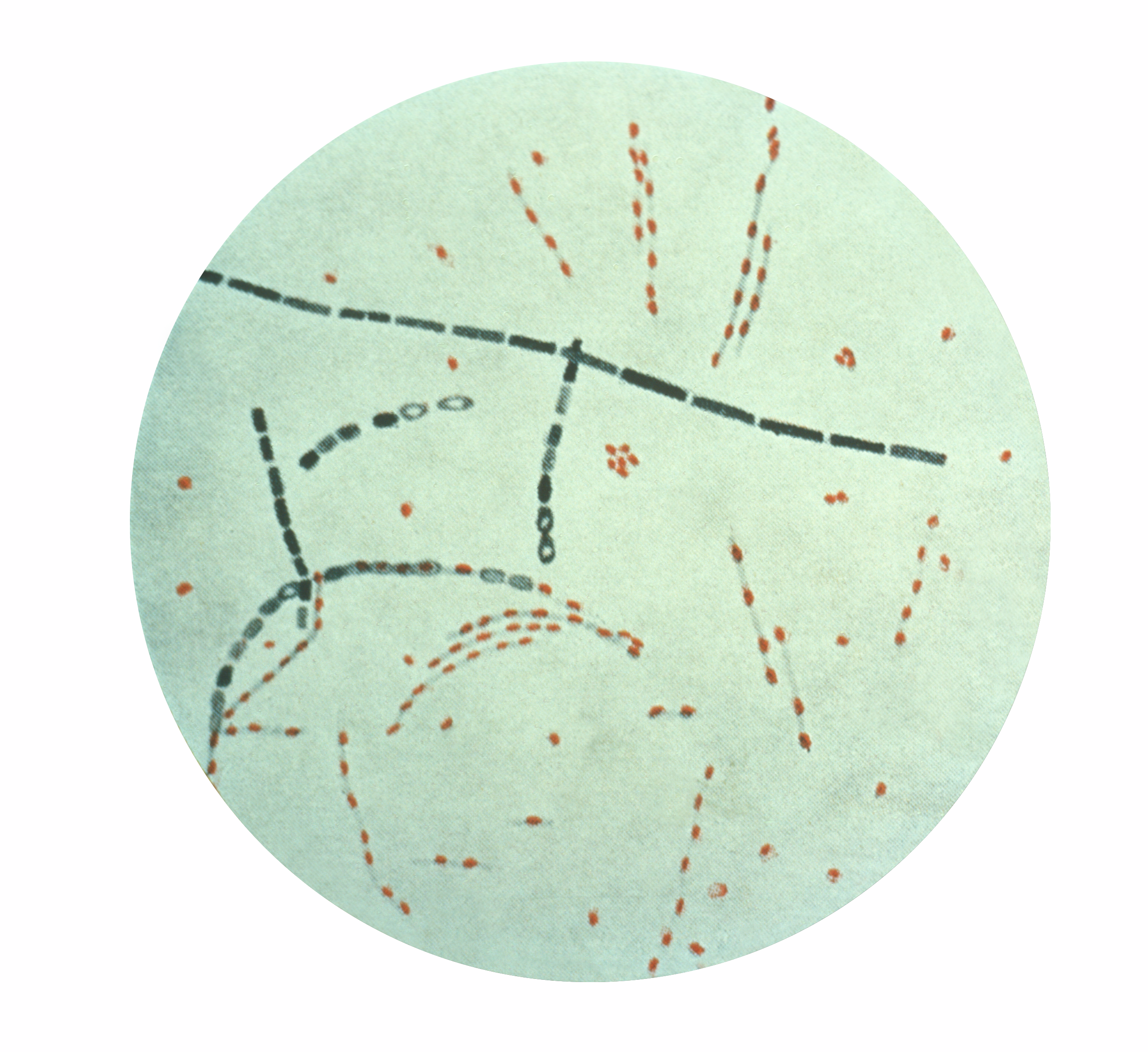
- Photomicrograph of Bacillus anthracis, stained using fuchsin-methylene blue (spore stain)

Scientific classification
- Domain: Bacteria
- Kingdom: Bacillati
- Phylum: Bacillota
- Class: Bacilli
- Order: Caryophanales
- Family: Bacillaceae
- Genus: Bacillus
- Species: B. anthracis

Binomial name
- Bacillus anthracis Cohn, 1872

= Bacillus anthracis =

Species of bacterium

Bacillus anthracis is a gram-positive and rod-shaped bacterium that causes anthrax, a deadly disease to livestock and, occasionally, to humans. It is the only permanent (obligate) pathogen within the genus Bacillus. Its infection is a type of zoonosis, as it is transmitted from animals to humans. It was discovered by a German physician Robert Koch in 1876, and became the first bacterium to be experimentally shown as a pathogen. The discovery was also the first scientific evidence for the germ theory of diseases.

B. anthracis measures about 3 to 5 μm long and 1 to 1.2 μm wide. The reference genome consists of a 5,227,419 bp circular chromosome and two extrachromosomal DNA plasmids, pXO1 and pXO2, of 181,677 and 94,830 bp respectively, which are responsible for the pathogenicity. It forms a protective layer called endospore by which it can remain inactive for many years and suddenly becomes infective under suitable environmental conditions. Because of the resilience of the endospore, the bacterium is one of the most popular biological weapons. The protein capsule (poly-D-gamma-glutamic acid) is key to evasion of the immune response. It feeds on the heme of blood protein haemoglobin using two secretory siderophore proteins, IsdX1 and IsdX2.

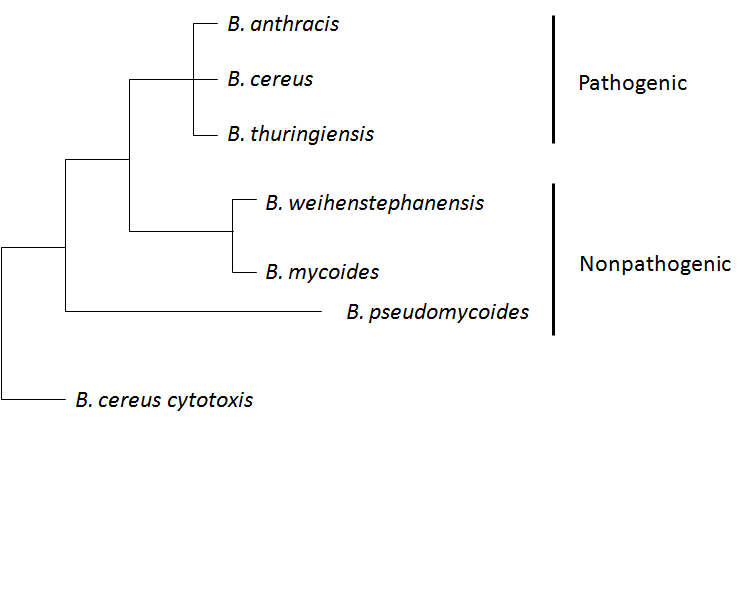
Phylogenic tree showing B. anthracis in the B. cereus group of strains.

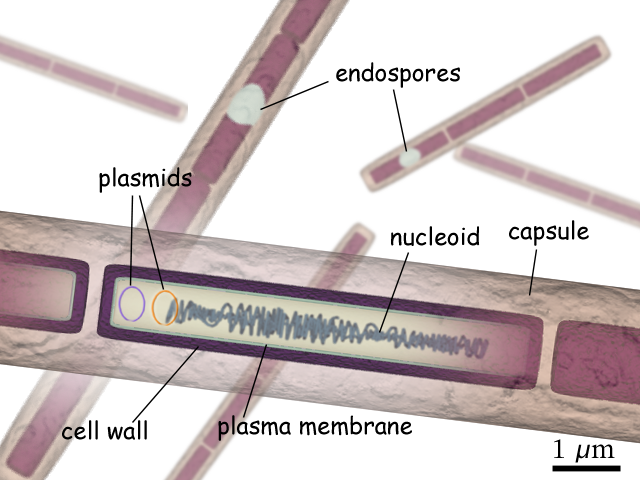
Structure of B. anthracis

Untreated B. anthracis infection is usually deadly. Infection is indicated by inflammatory, black, necrotic lesions (eschars). The sores usually appear on the face, neck, arms, or hands. Fatal symptoms include a flu-like fever, chest discomfort, diaphoresis (excessive sweating), and body aches. The first animal vaccine against anthrax was developed by French chemist Louis Pasteur in 1881. Different animal and human vaccines are now available. The infection can be treated with common antibiotics such as penicillins, quinolones, and tetracyclines.

== Description ==
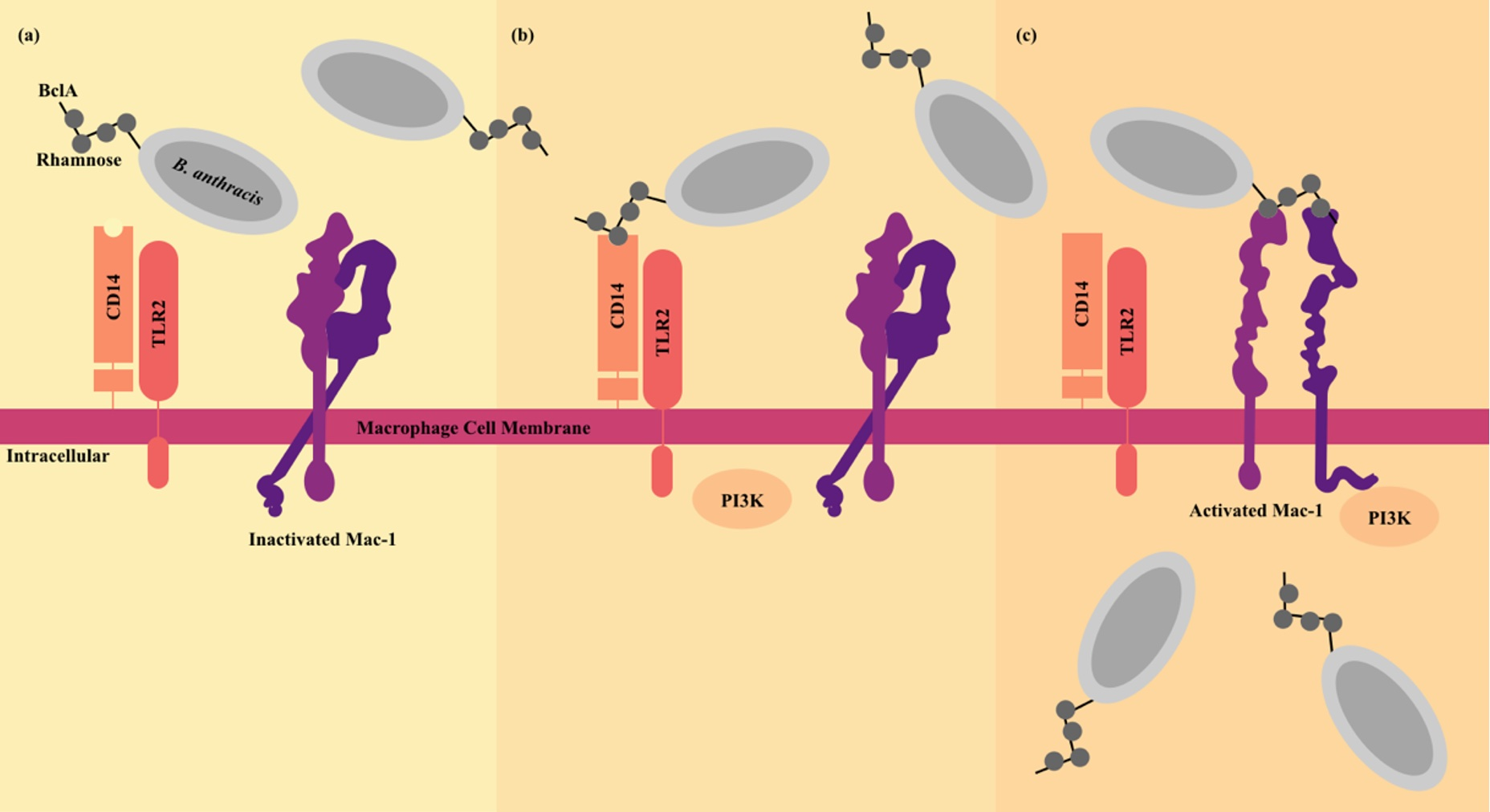
CD14 and Mac-1 work together to increase the macrophage internalization of B. anthracis spores. (a) CD14 and TLR2 work in close proximity to propagate the activation signal. Mac-1 starts in a closed conformation which keeps the integrin from binding the spores, keeping them out of the cell. (b) CD14 binds the rhamnose residues on the BclA of the exosporium leading to TLR2-mediated activation of PI3K. (c) Activation of PI3K pushes Mac-1 into its open conformation so the spore can be bound and internalized (information from Oliva et al. 2009)

B. anthracis are rod-shaped bacteria, approximately 3 to 5 μm long and 1 to 1.2 μm wide. When grown in culture, they tend to form long chains of bacteria, often described as having a “boxcar” morphology due to their rectangular, blunt-ended appearance. On agar plates, they form large colonies several millimeters across that are generally white or cream colored. Most B. anthracis strains produce a capsule that gives colonies a slimy mucus-like appearance.

It is one of few bacteria known to synthesize a weakly immunogenic and antiphagocytic protein capsule (poly-D-gamma-glutamic acid) that disguises the vegetative bacterium from the host immune system. Most other bacterial species are surrounded by a polysaccharide capsule rather than poly-g-D-glutamic acid which provides an evolutionary advantage to B. anthracis. Polysaccharides are associated with adhesion of neutrophil-secreted defensins that inactivate and degrade the bacteria. By not containing this macromolecule in the capsule, B. anthracis can evade a neutrophilic attack and continue to propagate infection. The difference in capsule composition is also significant because poly-g-D-glutamic acid has been hypothesized to create a negative charge which protects the vegetative phase of the bacteria from phagocytosis by host macrophages. The capsule is degraded to a lower molecular mass and released from the bacterial cell surface to act as a decoy to protect the bacteria from the host's complement system.

Like Bordetella pertussis, it forms a calmodulin-dependent adenylate cyclase exotoxin known as anthrax edema factor, along with anthrax lethal factor. It bears close genotypic and phenotypic resemblance to Bacillus cereus and Bacillus thuringiensis. All three species share cellular dimensions and morphology. All form oval spores located centrally in an unswollen sporangium. B. anthracis endospores, in particular, are highly resilient, surviving extremes of temperature, low-nutrient environments, and harsh chemical treatment over decades or centuries.

The endospore is a dehydrated cell with thick walls and additional layers that form inside the cell membrane. It can remain inactive for many years, but if it comes into a favorable environment, it begins to grow again. It initially develops inside the rod-shaped form. Features such as the location within the rod, the size and shape of the endospore, and whether or not it causes the wall of the rod to bulge out are characteristic of particular species of Bacillus. Depending upon the species, the endospores are round, oval, or occasionally cylindrical. They are highly refractile and contain dipicolinic acid. Electron micrograph sections show they have a thin outer endospore coat, a thick spore cortex, and an inner spore membrane surrounding the endospore contents. The endospores resist heat, drying, and many disinfectants (including 95% ethanol). Because of these attributes, B. anthracis endospores are extraordinarily well-suited to use (in powdered and aerosol form) as biological weapons. Such weaponization has been accomplished in the past by at least five state bioweapons programs—those of the United Kingdom, Japan, the United States, Russia, and Iraq—and has been attempted by several others.

== Genome structure ==
B. anthracis has a single chromosome which is a circular DNA molecule consisting of 5,227,293-bp. It also has two circular, extrachromosomal, double-stranded DNA plasmids, pXO1 and pXO2. Both the pXO1 and pXO2 plasmids are required for full virulence and represent two distinct plasmid families.

Feature	Chromosome	pXO1	pXO2
Size (bp)	5,227,293	181,677	94,829
Number of genes	5,508	217	113
Replicon coding (%)	84.3	77.1	76.2
Average gene length (nt)	800	645	639
G+C content (%)	35.4	32.5	33.0
rRNA operons	11	0	0
tRNAs	95	0	0
sRNAs	3	2	0
Phage genes	62	0	0
Transposon genes	18	15	6
Disrupted reading frame	37	5	7
Genes with assigned function	2,762	65	38
Conserved hypothetical genes	1,212	22	19
Genes of unknown function	657	8	5
Hypothetical genes	877	122	51

=== pXO1 plasmid ===
The pXO1 plasmid (182 kb) contains the genes that encode for the anthrax toxin components: pag (protective antigen, PA), lef (lethal factor, LF), and cya (edema factor, EF). These factors are contained within a 44.8-kb pathogenicity island (PAI) on the plasmid. The lethal factor toxin is a combination of PA with LF, and the edema factor toxin is a combination of PA with EF. The PAI also contains genes which encode a transcriptional activator AtxA and the repressor PagR, both of which regulate the expression of the anthrax toxin genes.

=== pXO2 plasmid ===
pXO2 encodes a five-gene operon (capBCADE) which synthesizes a poly-γ-D-glutamic acid (polyglutamate) capsule. This capsule allows B. anthracis to evade the host immune system by protecting itself from phagocytosis. Expression of the capsule operon is activated by the transcriptional regulators AcpA and AcpB, located in the pXO2 pathogenicity island (35 kb). The AtxA from pXO1 controls expression of both AcpA and AcpB.

== Strains ==
The 89 known strains of B. anthracis include:

- Sterne strain (34F2; aka the "Weybridge strain"), used by Max Sterne in his 1930s vaccines
- Vollum strain, formerly weaponized by the US, UK, and Iraq; isolated from a cow in Oxfordshire, UK, in 1935
  - Vollum M-36, virulent British research strain; passed through macaques 36 times
  - Vollum 1B, weaponized by the US and UK in the 1940s-60s
  - Vollum-14578, used in UK bio-weapons trials which severely contaminated Gruinard Island in 1942
  - V770-NP1-R, the avirulent, nonencapsulated strain used in the BioThrax vaccine
- Anthrax 836, highly virulent strain weaponized by the USSR; discovered in Kirov in 1953
- Ames strain, isolated from a cow in Texas in 1981; famously used in AMERITHRAX letter attacks (2001)
  - Ames Ancestor
  - Ames Florida
- H9401, isolated from human patient in Korea; used in investigational anthrax vaccines

== Evolution ==
Whole genome sequencing has made reconstruction of the B. anthracis phylogeny extremely accurate. A contributing factor to the reconstruction is B. anthracis being monomorphic, meaning it has low genetic diversity, including the absence of any measurable lateral DNA transfer since its derivation as a species. The lack of diversity is due to a short evolutionary history that has precluded mutational saturation in single nucleotide polymorphisms.

A short evolutionary time does not necessarily mean a short chronological time. When DNA is replicated, mistakes occur which become genetic mutations. The buildup of these mutations over time leads to the evolution of a species. During the B. anthracis lifecycle, it spends a significant amount of time in the soil spore reservoir stage, in which DNA replication does not occur. These prolonged periods of dormancy have greatly reduced the evolutionary rate of the organism.

=== Related strains ===
B. anthracis belongs to the B. cereus group consisting of the strains: B. cereus, B. anthracis, B. thuringiensis, B. mycoides, and B. pseudomycoides. The first three strains are pathogenic or opportunistic to insects or mammals, while the last three are not considered pathogenic. The strains of this group are genetically and phenotypically heterogeneous overall, but some of the strains are more closely related and phylogenetically intermixed at the chromosome level. The B. cereus group generally exhibits complex genomes and most carry varying numbers of plasmids.

B. cereus is a soil-dwelling bacterium which can colonize the gut of invertebrates as a symbiont and is a frequent cause of food poisoning It produces an emetic toxin, enterotoxins, and other virulence factors. The enterotoxins and virulence factors are encoded on the chromosome, while the emetic toxin is encoded on a 270-kb plasmid, pCER270.

B. thuringiensis is a microorganism pathogen and is characterized by production of parasporal crystals of insecticidal toxins Cry and Cyt. The genes encoding these proteins are commonly located on plasmids which can be lost from the organism, making it indistinguishable from B. cereus.

A phylogenomic analysis of the Cereus clade combined with average nucleotide identity (ANI) analysis revealed that the B. anthracis species also includes strains annotated as B. cereus and B. thuringiensis.

=== Pseudogene ===
PlcR is a global transcriptional regulator which controls most of the secreted virulence factors in B. cereus and B. thuringiensis. It is chromosomally encoded and is ubiquitous throughout the cell. In B. anthracis, however, the plcR gene contains a single base change at position 640, a nonsense mutation, which creates a dysfunctional protein. While 1% of the B. cereus group carries an inactivated plcR gene, none of them carries the specific mutation found only in B. anthracis.

The plcR gene is part of a two-gene operon with papR. The papR gene encodes a small protein which is secreted from the cell and then reimported as a processed heptapeptide forming a quorum-sensing system. The lack of PlcR in B. anthracis is a principle characteristic differentiating it from other members of the B. cereus group. While B. cereus and B. thuringiensis depend on the plcR gene for expression of their virulence factors, B. anthracis relies on the pXO1 and pXO2 plasmids for its virulence. Bacillus cereus biovar anthracis, i.e. B. cereus with the two plasmids, is also capable of causing anthrax.

== Human disease aspects ==
=== Pathogenesis ===
B. anthracis possesses an antiphagocytic capsule essential for full virulence. The organism also produces three plasmid-coded exotoxins: edema factor, a calmodulin-dependent adenylate cyclase that causes elevation of intracellular cAMP and is responsible for the severe edema usually seen in B. anthracis infections, lethal toxin which is responsible for causing tissue necrosis, and protective antigen, so named because of its use in producing protective anthrax vaccines, which mediates cell entry of edema factor and lethal toxin.

=== Manifestations in human disease ===
The symptoms in anthrax depend on the type of infection and can take anywhere from 1 day to more than 2 months to appear. All types of anthrax have the potential, if untreated, to spread throughout the body and cause severe illness and even death.

Four forms of human anthrax disease are recognized based on their portal of entry.

- Cutaneous, the most common form (95%), causes a localized, inflammatory, black, necrotic lesion (eschar). Most often the sore will appear on the face, neck, arms, or hands. Development can occur within 1–7 days after exposure.
- Inhalation, a rare but highly fatal form, is characterized by flu-like symptoms, chest discomfort, diaphoresis, and body aches. Development occurs usually a week after exposure, but can take up to two months.
- Gastrointestinal, a rare but also fatal (causes death to 25%) type, results from ingestion of spores. Symptoms include: fever and chills, swelling of neck, painful swallowing, hoarseness, nausea and vomiting (especially bloody vomiting), diarrhea, flushing and red eyes, and swelling of abdomen. Symptoms can develop within 1–7 days
- Injection, symptoms are similar to those of cutaneous anthrax, but injected anthrax can spread throughout the body faster and can be harder to recognize and treat compared to cutaneous anthrax. Symptoms include, fever, chills, a group of small bumps or blisters that may itch, appearing where the pathogen was injected. A painless sore with a black center that appears after the blisters or bumps. Swelling around the sore. Abscesses deep under the skin or in the muscle where the pathogen was injected. This type of entry has never been found in the US.

=== Prevention and treatment ===
A number of anthrax vaccines have been developed for preventive use in livestock and humans. Anthrax vaccine adsorbed (AVA) may protect against cutaneous and inhalation anthrax. However, this vaccine is only used for at-risk adults before exposure to anthrax and has not been approved for use after exposure. Infections with B. anthracis can be treated with β-lactam antibiotics such as penicillin, and others which are active against Gram-positive bacteria. Penicillin-resistant B. anthracis can be treated with fluoroquinolones such as ciprofloxacin or tetracycline antibiotics such as doxycycline.

== Laboratory research ==
Components of tea, such as polyphenols, have the ability to inhibit the activity both of B. anthracis and its toxin considerably; spores, however, are not affected. The addition of milk to the tea completely inhibits its antibacterial activity against anthrax. Activity against the B. anthracis in the laboratory does not prove that drinking tea affects the course of an infection, since it is unknown how these polyphenols are absorbed and distributed within the body. B. anthracis can be cultured on PLET agar, a selective and differential media designed to select specifically for B. anthracis.

=== Recent research ===
Advances in genotyping methods have led to improved genetic analysis for variation and relatedness. These methods include multiple-locus variable-number tandem repeat analysis (MLVA) and typing systems using canonical single-nucleotide polymorphisms. The Ames ancestor chromosome was sequenced in 2003 and contributes to the identification of genes involved in the virulence of B. anthracis. Recently, B. anthracis isolate H9401 was isolated from a Korean patient suffering from gastrointestinal anthrax. The goal of the Republic of Korea is to use this strain as a challenge strain to develop a recombinant vaccine against anthrax.

The H9401 strain isolated in the Republic of Korea was sequenced using 454 GS-FLX technology and analyzed using several bioinformatics tools to align, annotate, and compare H9401 to other B. anthracis strains. The sequencing coverage level suggests a molecular ratio of pXO1:pXO2:chromosome as 3:2:1 which is identical to the Ames Florida and Ames Ancestor strains. H9401 has 99.679% sequence homology with Ames Ancestor with an amino acid sequence homology of 99.870%. H9401 has a circular chromosome (5,218,947 bp with 5,480 predicted ORFs), the pXO1 plasmid (181,700 bp with 202 predicted ORFs), and the pXO2 plasmid (94,824 bp with 110 predicted ORFs). As compared to the Ames Ancestor chromosome above, the H9401 chromosome is about 8.5 kb smaller. Due to the high pathogenecity and sequence similarity to the Ames Ancestor, H9401 will be used as a reference for testing the efficacy of candidate anthrax vaccines by the Republic of Korea.

Since the genome of B. anthracis was sequenced, alternative ways to battle this disease are being endeavored. Bacteria have developed several strategies to evade recognition by the immune system. The predominant mechanism for avoiding detection, employed by all bacteria is molecular camouflage. Slight modifications in the outer layer that render the bacteria practically invisible to lysozymes. Three of these modifications have been identified and characterized. These include (1) N-glycosylation of N-acetyl-muramic acid, (2) O-acetylation of N-acetylmuramic acid and (3) N-deacetylation of N-acetyl-glucosamine. Research during the last few years has focused on inhibiting such modifications. As a result the enzymatic mechanism of polysaccharide de-acetylases is being investigated, that catalyze the removal of an acetyl group from N-acetyl-glucosamine and N-acetyl-muramic acid, components of the peptidoglycan layer.

== Host interactions ==
As with most other pathogenic bacteria, B. anthracis must acquire iron to grow and proliferate in its host environment. The most readily available iron sources for pathogenic bacteria are the heme groups used by the host in the transport of oxygen. To scavenge heme from host hemoglobin and myoglobin, B. anthracis uses two secretory siderophore proteins, IsdX1 and IsdX2. These proteins can separate heme from hemoglobin, allowing surface proteins of B. anthracis to transport it into the cell.

B. anthracis must evade the immune system to establish a successful infection. B. anthracis spores are immediately phagocytosed by macrophages and dendritic cells once they enter the host. The dendritic cells can control the infection through effective intracellular elimination, but the macrophages can transport the bacteria directly inside the host by crossing a thin layer of epithelial or endothelial cells to reach the circulatory system. Normally, in the phagocytosis process, the pathogen is digested upon internalization by the macrophage. However, rather than being degraded, the anthrax spores hijack the function of the macrophage to evade recognition by the host immune system. Phagocytosis of B. anthracis spores begins when the transmembrane receptors on the extracellular membrane of the phagocyte interacts with a molecule on the surface of the spore. CD14, an extracellular protein embedded in the host membrane, binds to rhamnose residues of BclA, a glycoprotein of the B. anthracis exosporium, which promotes inside-out activation of the integrin Mac-1, enhancing spore internalization by macrophages. This cascade results in phagocytic cellular activation and induction of an inflammatory response.

== Sampling ==
The presence of B. anthracis can be determined through samples taken on non-porous surfaces.

How to sample with cellulose sponge on non-porous surfaces

How to sample with macrofoam swab on non-porous surfaces

== Historical background ==
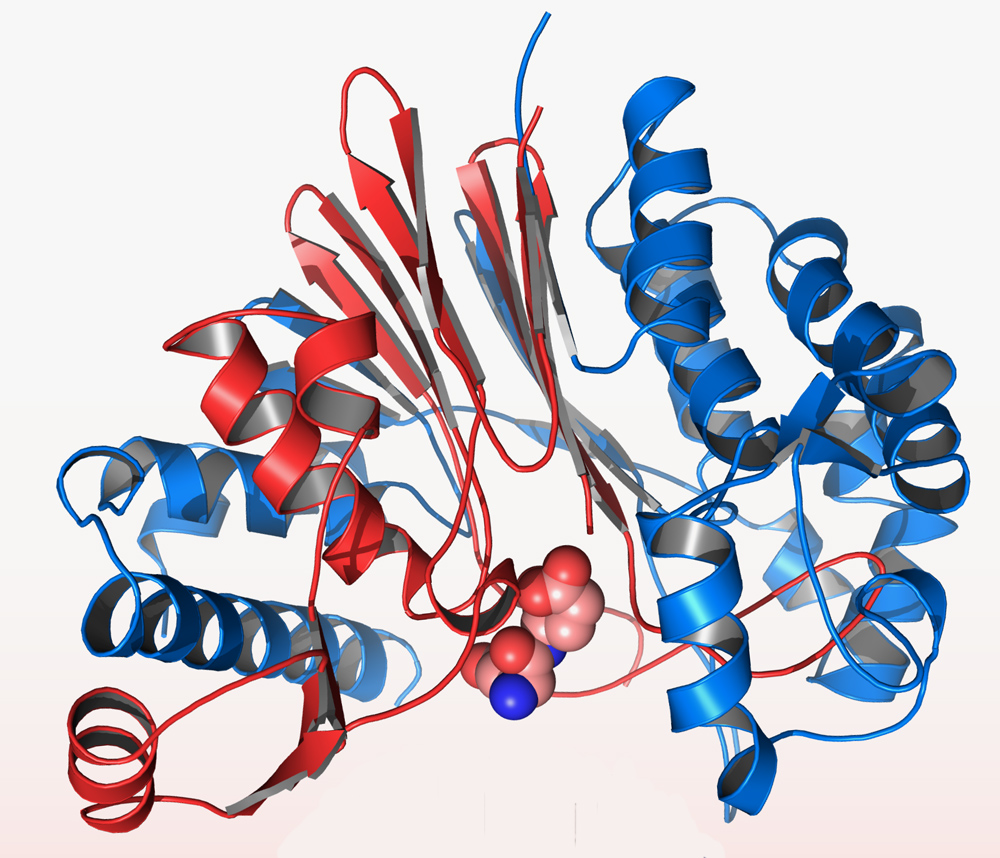
CapD protein crystal structure of B. anthracis

French physician Casimir Davaine (1812–1882) demonstrated the symptoms of anthrax were invariably accompanied by the microbe B. anthracis. German physician Aloys Pollender (1799–1879) is credited for discovery. B. anthracis was the first bacterium conclusively demonstrated to cause disease, by Robert Koch in 1876. The species name anthracis is from the Greek anthrax (ἄνθραξ), meaning "coal" and referring to the most common form of the disease, cutaneous anthrax, in which large, black skin lesions are formed.

The first vaccine containing live organisms was Louis Pasteur's veterinary anthrax vaccine.
