= Vollum =

Vollum is a surname. Notable people with the surname include:

- Gerd Vollum (1920–2009), Norwegian politician
- Howard Vollum (1913–1986), American engineer, scientist and philanthropist

== See also ==
- Vollum Institute, a research institute in Portland, Oregon, United States
- Vollum strain, a strain of anthrax
