= Polyglutamic acid =

- Gamma PGA

Names
- Systematic IUPAC name Poly[imino[1-carboxy-4-oxo-1,4-butanediyl]]

Identifiers
CAS Number	25736-27-0
ChemSpider	none

Properties
Chemical formula	(C_{5}H_{7}NO_{3})_{n}
Molar mass	variable
- Except where otherwise noted, data are given for materials in their standard state (at 25 °C [77 °F], 100 kPa). Infobox references

Polyglutamic acid (PGA) is a polymer of the amino acid glutamic acid (GA). Depending on where the individual monomers connect, PGA can be gamma PGA (poly-γ-glutamic acid, γ-PGA), the form where the peptide bonds are between the amino group of GA and the carboxyl group at the end of the GA side chain, or alpha PGA, the form where the alpha-carboxyl is used to form the peptide bond.

Gamma PGA is formed by bacterial fermentation. It is a major constituent of the Japanese food nattō and has a wide range of uses.

Alpha PGA has been investigated as a drug delivery system.

== Structure ==
Both form of PGA are linked together by peptide bonds. Because the glutamic acid has a chiral center, both forms of PGA can be made from L-glutamic acid, D-glutamic acid, or a mixture of both. In practical use, alpha PGA is composed mostly of L-glutamic acid, while gamma PGA tends to have a mixture of both.

== Properties ==
Gamma PGA is non-immunogenic and biodegradable. It hydrolyzes in hot water.

Both forms are amphiphilic, water-soluble, and have a negative charge.

== Synthesis ==
Gamma PGA is industrially made by fermentation. The biosynthetic process starts with racemerization by RacE, which converts L-glutamate to D-glutamate. A set of genes on an operon then proceed to assemble the molecule and move it out of the bacterial cell.

Alpha PGA is industrially made by chemical synthesis, using a ring-opening polymerization reaction.

== Occurrence ==
Gamma PGA is made by a number of Bacillus species. The best-known source is natto, where it is produced by Bacillus subtilis. It is also an important component of the Bacillus anthracis capsule, hiding the bacterium from the immune system and allowing it to grow unchecked.

== Uses ==
Gamma PGA has been used for food (potential thickener), medicine (pre-clinical), cosmeceuticals and water treatment.

Alpha PGA is used as a delivery aid for paclitaxel, an anticancer drug, under the generic name of paclitaxel poliglumex. Research is underway for its application in assisting in the treatment of type I diabetes and its potential use in the production of an AIDS vaccine.

=== Water treatment ===
The "PolyGlu PGα21Ca" water flocculant, based on a mixture of gamma PGA, calcium sulfate, and calcium carbonate, is used by the International Organization for Migration to treat water for refugees.

G-PGA covalently incorporated into microfiltration membranes via attachment to their membrane pore surfaces exhibited super-high heavy metal sorption ability. G-PGA was found to bind and efficiently remove 99.8% of lead ions from water via a suitable low-pressure ultrafiltration technique.
