= Vollum strain =

Strain of anthrax

The Vollum strain is one of the 89 known strains of the anthrax bacterium (Bacillus anthracis). It is named Vollum after Roy Vollum, the Canadian-born bacteriologist who first isolated it from a cow in Oxford, England. The "Vollum 14578" strain was selected for use in the bioweapons trials on Gruinard Island, which took place in 1942.

Like other forms of anthrax, the Vollum strain becomes more virulent with exposure to more hosts. A sub-strain called Vollum 1B was weaponized and was used in American warheads during the 1960s, but its origin is controversial. One theory that originated from a bio weapons veteran, William C. Patrick III, is that Vollum 1B came from being altered when the microbiologist William A. Boyles inhaled anthrax spores on the job. According to him, the "B" is there to stand for Boyles. A competing theory is based on the fact that during the 1940s and 1950s, a British biological weapons program worked to enhance the virulence of the strain by passing it through a series of monkey hosts, which created a sub-strain of the Vollum strain called "M36". In papers that reference this "M36" sub-strain, it is called the Vollum 1B strain.

The M36 Vollum was reliably virulent, as opposed to other newly mutated strains, and thus it was chosen along with other Vollum derived strains to be used as tests for the effectiveness of newly developed vaccines against anthrax. Vollum proved to be so effective, that it continued to be used as a testing strain for developing vaccines for several decades and has continued even to the present.

Regardless of its use for good to develop vaccines against anthrax, the Vollum strain is still highly dangerous and is thought to have been the strain that the Iraqi government possessed during the Gulf War. Evidence for this supposition comes from a faction of the United Nations Special Commission, UNSCOM BW45, which analyzed samples from places that they believed to be dump sites and found 14 positive hits for the Vollum strain in the northern area of Al Hakam's boundary.
