= Recombinant live vaccine =

Type of vaccine

Live recombinant vaccines are biological preparations that stimulate immune responses to a pathogen through the use of genetically modified live bacteria or viruses. These live pathogens are biologically engineered to express exogenous antigens in the cytoplasm of target cells, thereby triggering immune responses. This form of vaccine combines the beneficial features of attenuated and recombinant vaccines, providing the long-lasting immunity of attenuated vaccines’ with recombinant vaccines’ genetically engineered precision and safety.

Live recombinant vaccines can be administered via orally or nasally, instead of injection. Common examples of vaccines with the aforementioned route of admission include the oral polio vaccine and the nasal spray influenza vaccine. These vaccines can stimulate mucosal immunity and eliminate adverse effects associated with injection. Research and development efforts focus on enhancing live recombinant vaccines to offer heightened protection and broader coverage against various bacteria and virus serotypes.

== History ==
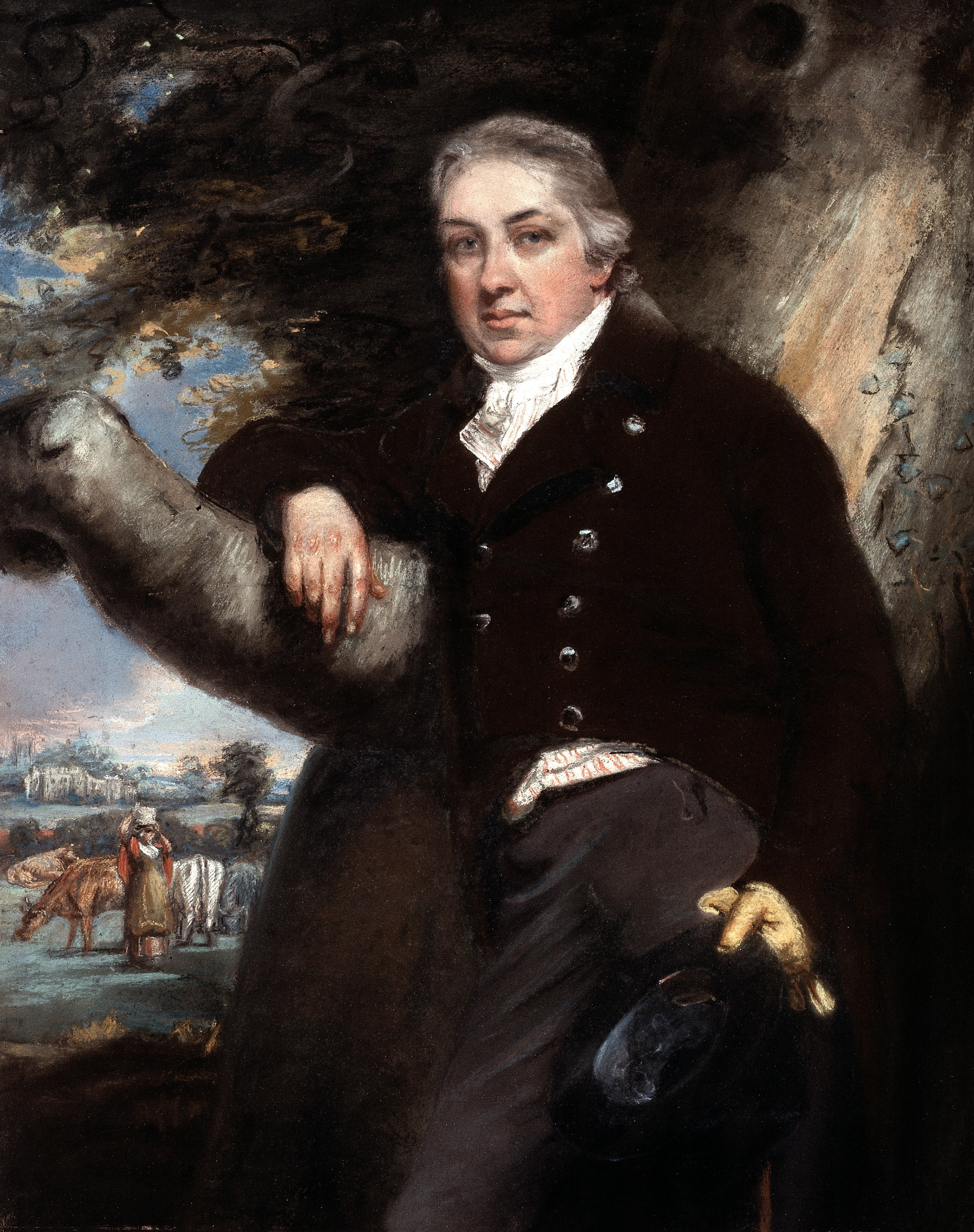
Edward Jenner, an English Physician, who created the first ever vaccine.

The first vaccine was for smallpox. Edward Jenner used cowpox pus to create immunity. Notable subsequent vaccines include polio, flu (influenza), hepatitis A and B, measles, rotavirus, and pneumococcal disease.

Live vaccines include live attenuated (MMR-II), rVSV-ZEBOV vaccine (Ebola), and live recombinant vaccines.

== Features / Mechanisms ==
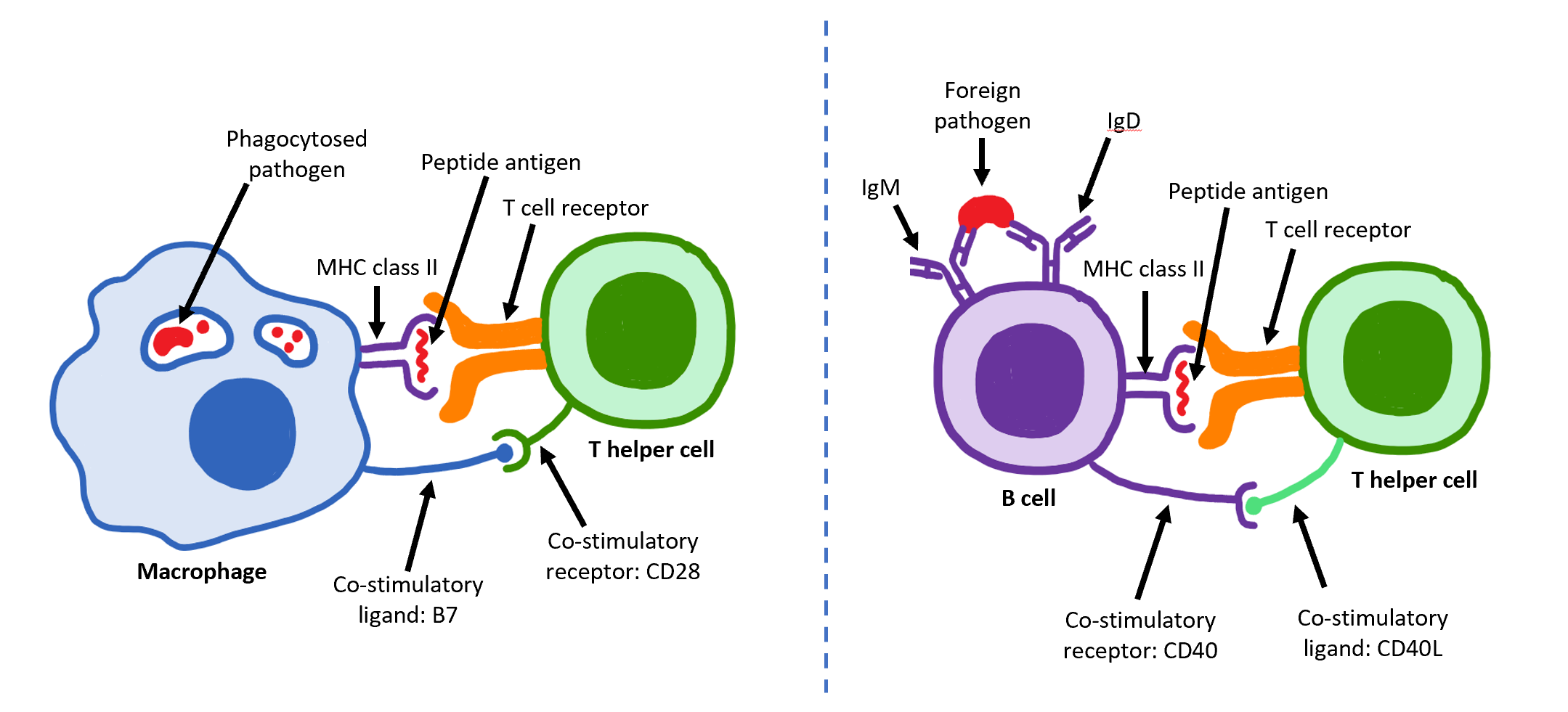
T and B cell Activation

Using a mechanism similar to infections that occur naturally, live recombinant vaccines can generate immunity that is robust and long-lasting. Pathogens in traditional live attenuated vaccines can cause disease in hosts with immune-compromised, damaged or weakened immune systems. Live recombinant vaccines are genetically engineered to inhibit their disease-causing ability. This reduces the chances of infection after vaccination. There are currently no widely deployed live recombinant vaccines.

== Clinical Use ==
=== Research ===
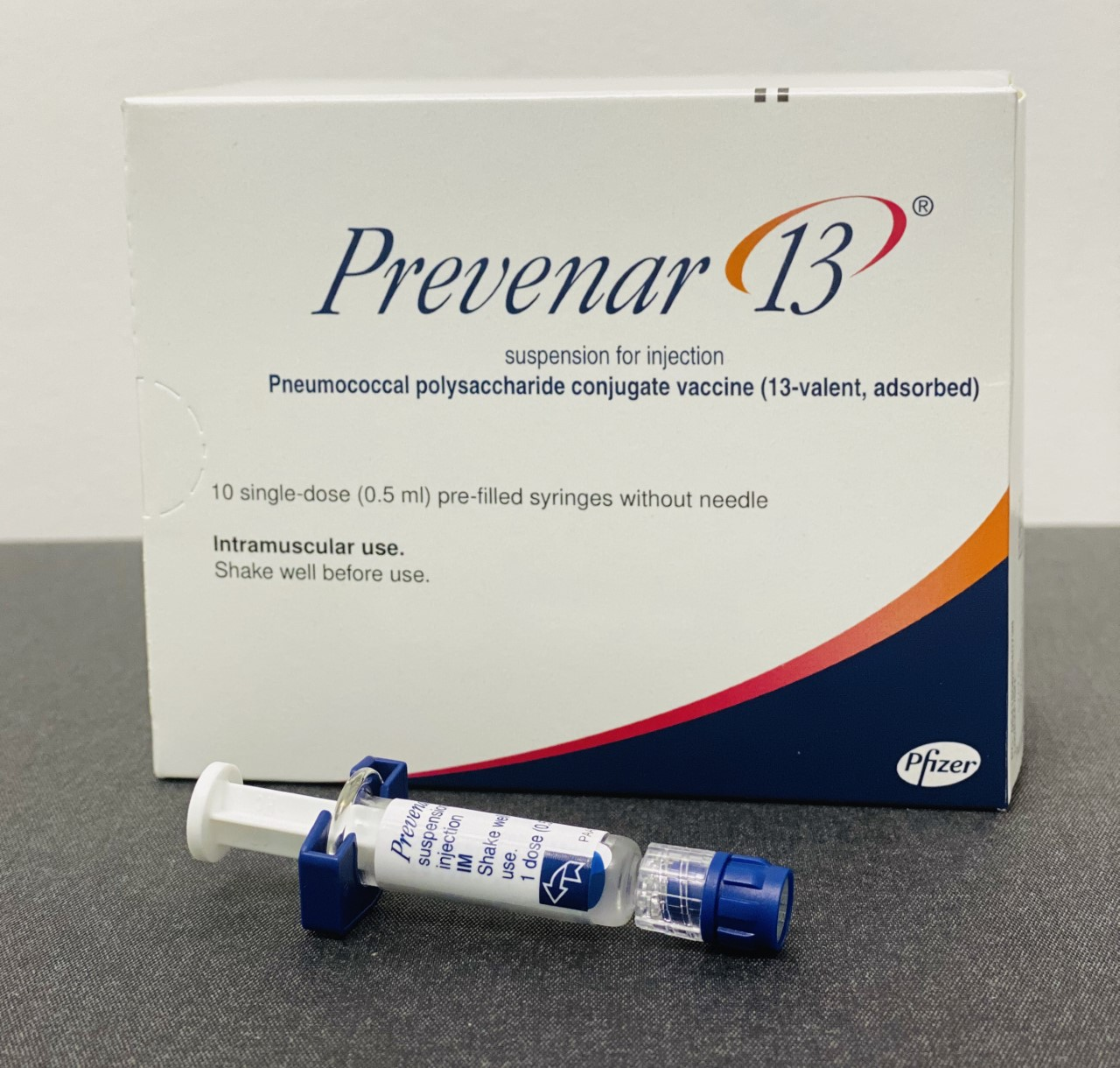
Pfizer's Prevnar 13

Recombinant vaccines causing protein, viral vectors and conjugates are under research. Research is searching for better Streptococcus vaccines. Existing polyvalent vaccines protect against as many as 23 serotypes, but need to address the entire set of 100 serotypes. In 2021, 2 vaccines were launched by Pfizer and Merck: Prevnar 20 (PCV-20) and Vaxneuvance (PCV-15), respectively. Vaxneuvance covers 5 fewer serotypes, but the combination of Pneumovax 23 with Vaxneuvance covers more serotypes than Prevnar20. Vaccines are heading for stronger protection against known serotypes, but also attack other strains or serotypes.

== Precautions ==
While live recombinant vaccines are generally considered to be safe, genetically modified organisms can potentially revert to pathogenic modes, causing disease, particularly in young, immunocompromised and/or older subjects.
