= NHE (disambiguation) =

NHE or Nhe, an acronym, may refer to:

- Non-human entity or non-human extraterrestrial, see Extraterrestrial Biological Entity

== In science ==
- Normal hydrogen electrode
- sodium-hydrogen exchanger, in molecular biology, a family of biological exchanges
- Non-haemolytic enterotoxin, see Bacillus haemolytic enterotoxin

== Other ==
- Nahuatl Huasteca Eastern (Hidalgo), a Nahuan language form in Mexico. See Huasteca Nahuatl
- New Home Economics, a household approach to the study of economics
- The station code for the New Hythe railway station in the United Kingdom
- The code letters of the World War I naval destroyer vessel USS Hull (DD-7)
- New Hydrogen Energy, a 1992-1997 program in Japan researching cold fusion
