= Bacillus haemolytic enterotoxin =

Bacillus_HBL

Identifiers
- Symbol: Bacillus_HBL
- Pfam: PF05791
- InterPro: IPR008414
- TCDB: 1.C.41
Available protein structures:
- PDB: IPR008414 PF05791 (ECOD; PDBsum)
- AlphaFold: IPR008414; PF05791

In molecular biology, the Bacillus haemolytic enterotoxin family of proteins consists of several Bacillus haemolytic enterotoxins (HblC, HblD, HblA, NheA, and NheB), which can cause food poisoning in humans. Haemolysin BL (encoded by HBL) and non-haemolytic enterotoxin (encoded by NHE), represent the major enterotoxins produced by Bacillus cereus. Most of the cytotoxic activity of B. cereus isolates has been attributed to the level of Nhe, which may indicate a highly diarrheic potential. The exact mechanism by which B. cereus causes diarrhoea is unknown. Hbl, cytotoxin K (CytK) and Nhe are all putative causes.

Both Hbl and Nhe are three-component cytotoxins composed of a binding component, B, and two lytic components, L1 and L2. All three subunits act synergically to cause hemolysis. Maximal cytotoxicity of Nhe against epithelia is dependent on all three components. Nhe has haemolytic activity against erythrocytes from a variety of species. It is possible that the common structural and functional properties of these toxins indicate that the Hbl/Nhe and ClyA families of toxins constitute a superfamily of pore-forming cytotoxins. Haemolysin BL and non-haemolytic enterotoxin production are both influenced by pH and micro.
