= Receptor (biochemistry) =

Protein molecule receiving signals for a cell

An example of membrane receptors.: 1. Ligands, located outside the cell; 2. Ligands connect to specific receptor proteins based on the shape of the active site of the protein.; 3. The receptor releases a messenger once the ligand has connected to the receptor.

In biochemistry and pharmacology, receptors are proteins that receive and transduce signals that may be integrated into biological systems. These signals are typically chemical messengers (Note: In the case of the receptor rhodopsin, the input is a photon, not a chemical) which bind to a receptor and produce physiological responses, such as a change in the electrical activity of a cell. For example, GABA, an inhibitory neurotransmitter, inhibits electrical activity of neurons by binding to GABA_{A} receptors. There are three main ways the action of the receptor can be classified: relay of signal, amplification, or integration. Relaying sends the signal onward, amplification increases the effect of a single ligand, and integration allows the signal to be incorporated into another biochemical pathway.

Receptor proteins can be classified by their location. Cell surface receptors, also known as transmembrane receptors, include ligand-gated ion channels, G protein-coupled receptors, and enzyme-linked hormone receptors. Intracellular receptors are those found inside the cell, and include cytoplasmic receptors and nuclear receptors. A molecule that binds to a receptor is called a ligand and can be a protein, peptide (short protein), or another small molecule, such as a neurotransmitter, hormone, pharmaceutical drug, toxin, calcium ion or parts of the outside of a virus or microbe. An endogenously produced substance that binds to a particular receptor is referred to as its endogenous ligand. E.g. the endogenous ligand for the nicotinic acetylcholine receptor is acetylcholine, but it can also be activated by nicotine and blocked by curare. Receptors of a particular type are linked to specific cellular biochemical pathways that correspond to the signal. While numerous receptors are found in most cells, each receptor will only bind with ligands of a particular structure. This has been analogously compared to how locks will only accept specifically shaped keys. When a ligand binds to a corresponding receptor, it activates or inhibits the receptor's associated biochemical pathway, which may also be highly specialised.

Receptor proteins can be also classified by the property of the ligands. Such classifications include chemoreceptors, mechanoreceptors, gravitropic receptors, photoreceptors, magnetoreceptors and gasoreceptors.

== Structure ==
Transmembrane receptor: E=extracellular space; I=intracellular space; P=plasma membrane

The structures of receptors are very diverse and include the following major categories, among others:

- Type 1: Ligand-gated ion channels (ionotropic receptors) – These receptors are typically the targets of fast neurotransmitters such as acetylcholine (nicotinic) and GABA; activation of these receptors results in changes in ion movement across a membrane. They have a heteromeric structure in that each subunit consists of the extracellular ligand-binding domain and a transmembrane domain which includes four transmembrane alpha helices. The ligand-binding cavities are located at the interface between the subunits.
- Type 2: G protein-coupled receptors (metabotropic receptors) – This is the largest family of receptors and includes the receptors for several hormones and slow transmitters e.g. dopamine, metabotropic glutamate. They are composed of seven transmembrane alpha helices. The loops connecting the alpha helices form extracellular and intracellular domains. The binding-site for larger peptide ligands is usually located in the extracellular domain whereas the binding site for smaller non-peptide ligands is often located between the seven alpha helices and one extracellular loop. The aforementioned receptors are coupled to different intracellular effector systems via G proteins. G proteins are heterotrimers made up of 3 subunits: α (alpha), β (beta), and γ (gamma). In the inactive state, the three subunits associate together and the α-subunit binds GDP. G protein activation causes a conformational change, which leads to the exchange of GDP for GTP. GTP-binding to the α-subunit causes dissociation of the β- and γ-subunits. Furthermore, the three subunits, α, β, and γ have additional four main classes based on their primary sequence. These include G_{s}, G_{i}, G_{q} and G_{12}.
- Type 3: Kinase-linked and related receptors (see "Receptor tyrosine kinase" and "Enzyme-linked receptor") – They are composed of an extracellular domain containing the ligand binding site and an intracellular domain, often with enzymatic-function, linked by a single transmembrane alpha helix. The insulin receptor is an example.
- Type 4: Nuclear receptors – While they are called nuclear receptors, many are actually located in the cytoplasm and migrate to the nucleus after binding with their ligands. They are composed of a C-terminal ligand-binding region, a core DNA-binding domain (DBD) and an N-terminal domain that contains the AF1(activation function 1) region. The core region has two zinc fingers that are responsible for recognizing the DNA sequences specific to this receptor. The N terminus interacts with other cellular transcription factors in a ligand-independent manner; and, depending on these interactions, it can modify the binding/activity of the receptor. Steroid and thyroid-hormone receptors are examples of such receptors.

Membrane receptors may be isolated from cell membranes by complex extraction procedures using solvents, detergents, and/or affinity purification.

The structures and actions of receptors may be studied by using biophysical methods such as X-ray crystallography, NMR, circular dichroism, and dual polarisation interferometry. Computer simulations of the dynamic behavior of receptors have been used to gain understanding of their mechanisms of action.

== Binding and activation ==
Ligand binding is an equilibrium process. Ligands bind to receptors and dissociate from them according to the law of mass action in the following equation, for a ligand L and receptor, R. The brackets around chemical species denote their concentrations.

$${[\ce{L}] + [\ce{R}] \ce{<=>[{K_d}]} [\text{LR}]}$$

One measure of how well a molecule fits a receptor is its binding affinity, which is inversely related to the dissociation constant K_{d}. A good fit corresponds with high affinity and low K_{d}. The final biological response (e.g. second messenger cascade, muscle-contraction), is only achieved after a significant number of receptors are activated.

Affinity is a measure of the tendency of a ligand to bind to its receptor. Efficacy is the measure of the bound ligand to activate its receptor.

=== Agonists versus antagonists ===
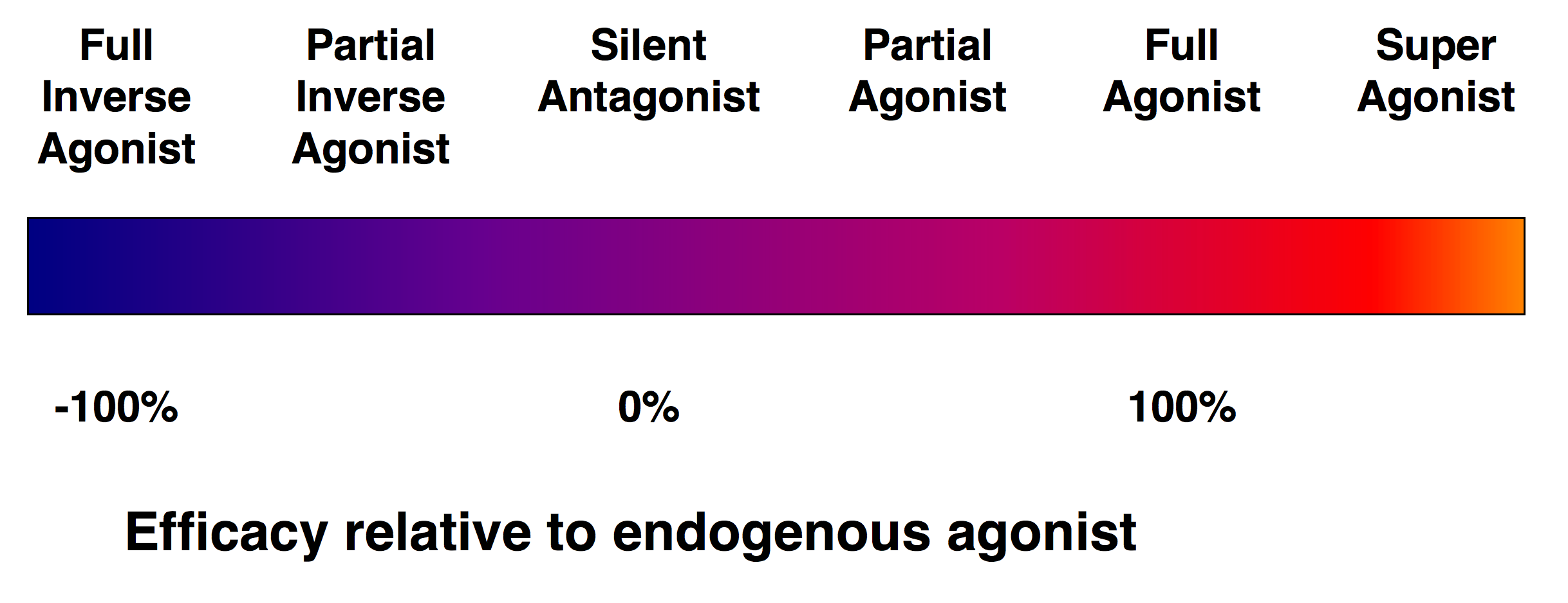
Efficacy spectrum of receptor ligands.

Not every ligand that binds to a receptor also activates that receptor. The following classes of ligands exist:

- (Full) agonists are able to activate the receptor and result in a strong biological response. The natural endogenous ligand with the greatest efficacy for a given receptor is by definition a full agonist (100% efficacy).
- Partial agonists do not activate receptors with maximal efficacy, even with maximal binding, causing partial responses compared to those of full agonists (efficacy between 0 and 100%).
- Antagonists bind to receptors but do not activate them. This results in a receptor blockade, inhibiting the binding of agonists and inverse agonists. Receptor antagonists can be competitive (or reversible), and compete with the agonist for the receptor, or they can be irreversible antagonists that form covalent bonds (or extremely high affinity non-covalent bonds) with the receptor and completely block it. The proton pump inhibitor omeprazole is an example of an irreversible antagonist. The effects of irreversible antagonism can only be reversed by synthesis of new receptors.
- Inverse agonists reduce the activity of receptors by inhibiting their constitutive activity (negative efficacy).
- Allosteric modulators: They do not bind to the agonist-binding site of the receptor but instead on specific allosteric binding sites, through which they modify the effect of the agonist. For example, benzodiazepines (BZDs) bind to the BZD site on the GABA_{A} receptor and potentiate the effect of endogenous GABA.

Note that the idea of receptor agonism and antagonism only refers to the interaction between receptors and ligands and not to their biological effects.

=== Constitutive activity ===
A receptor which is capable of producing a biological response in the absence of a bound ligand is said to display "constitutive activity". The constitutive activity of a receptor may be blocked by an inverse agonist. The anti-obesity drugs rimonabant and taranabant are inverse agonists at the cannabinoid CB1 receptor and though they produced significant weight loss, both were withdrawn owing to a high incidence of depression and anxiety, which are believed to relate to the inhibition of the constitutive activity of the cannabinoid receptor.

The GABA_{A} receptor has constitutive activity and conducts some basal current in the absence of an agonist. This allows beta carboline to act as an inverse agonist and reduce the current below basal levels.

Mutations in receptors that result in increased constitutive activity underlie some inherited diseases, such as precocious puberty (due to mutations in luteinizing hormone receptors) and hyperthyroidism (due to mutations in thyroid-stimulating hormone receptors).

== Theories of drug-receptor interaction ==
=== Occupation ===
Early forms of the receptor theory of pharmacology stated that a drug's effect is directly proportional to the number of receptors that are occupied. Furthermore, a drug effect ceases as a drug-receptor complex dissociates.

Ariëns & Stephenson introduced the terms "affinity" & "efficacy" to describe the action of ligands bound to receptors.

- Affinity: The ability of a drug to combine with a receptor to create a drug-receptor complex.
- Efficacy: The ability of drug to initiate a response after the formation of drug-receptor complex.

=== Rate ===
In contrast to the accepted Occupation Theory, Rate Theory proposes that the activation of receptors is directly proportional to the total number of encounters of a drug with its receptors per unit time. Pharmacological activity is directly proportional to the rates of dissociation and association, not the number of receptors occupied:

- Agonist: A drug with a fast association and a fast dissociation.
- Partial-agonist: A drug with an intermediate association and an intermediate dissociation.
- Antagonist: A drug with a fast association & slow dissociation

=== Induced-fit ===
As a drug approaches a receptor, the receptor alters the conformation of its binding site to produce drug—receptor complex.

=== Spare receptors ===
In some receptor systems (e.g. acetylcholine at the neuromuscular junction in smooth muscle), agonists are able to elicit maximal response at very low levels of receptor occupancy (<1%). Thus, that system has spare receptors or a receptor reserve. This arrangement produces an economy of neurotransmitter production and release.

== Receptor regulation ==
Cells can increase (upregulate) or decrease (downregulate) the number of receptors to a given hormone or neurotransmitter to alter their sensitivity to different molecules. This is a locally acting feedback mechanism.

- Change in the receptor conformation such that binding of the agonist does not activate the receptor. This is seen with ion channel receptors.
- Uncoupling of the receptor effector molecules is seen with G protein-coupled receptors.
- Receptor sequestration (internalization), e.g. in the case of hormone receptors.

== Examples and ligands ==
The ligands for receptors are as diverse as their receptors. GPCRs (7TMs) are a particularly vast family, with at least 810 members. There are also LGICs for at least a dozen endogenous ligands, and many more receptors possible through different subunit compositions. Some common examples of ligands and receptors include:

=== Ion channels and G protein coupled receptors ===
Some example ionotropic (LGIC) and metabotropic (specifically, GPCRs) receptors are shown in the table below. The chief neurotransmitters are glutamate and GABA; other neurotransmitters are neuromodulatory. This list is by no means exhaustive.

Endogenous Ligand	Ion channel receptor (LGIC)			G protein coupled receptor (GPCR)		
Endogenous Ligand	Receptors	Ion current (Note: Different LGICs conduct currents of different ions. This is accomplished with selectivity filters, such as the selectivity filter of the K+ ion channel)	Exogenous Ligand	Receptors	G protein	Exogenous Ligand
Glutamate	iGluRs: NMDA, AMPA, and Kainate receptors	Na^{+}, K^{+}, Ca^{2+}	Ketamine	Glutamate receptors: mGluRs	Gq or Gi/o	-
GABA	GABA_{A} (including GABA_{A}-rho)	Cl^{−} > HCO^{−}_{3}	Benzodiazepines	GABA_{B} receptor	Gi/o	Baclofen
Acetylcholine	nAChR	Na^{+}, K^{+}, Ca^{2+}	Nicotine	mAChR	Gq or Gi	Muscarine
Glycine	Glycine receptor (GlyR)	Cl^{−} > HCO^{−}_{3}	Strychnine	-	-	-
Serotonin	5-HT_{3} receptor	Na^{+}, K^{+}	Cereulide	5-HT1-2 or 4-7	Gs, Gi/o or Gq	-
ATP	P2X receptors	Ca^{2+}, Na^{+}, Mg^{2+}	BzATP	P2Y receptors	Gs, Gi/o or Gq	-
Dopamine	No ion channels	-	-	Dopamine receptor	Gs or Gi/o	-

=== Enzyme linked receptors ===
Enzyme linked receptors include Receptor tyrosine kinases (RTKs), serine/threonine-specific protein kinase, as in bone morphogenetic protein and guanylate cyclase, as in atrial natriuretic factor receptor. Of the RTKs, 20 classes have been identified, with 58 different RTKs as members. Some examples are shown below:

RTK Class/Receptor Family	Member	Endogenous Ligand	Exogenous Ligand
I	EGFR	EGF	Gefitinib
II	Insulin Receptor	Insulin	Chaetochromin
IV	VEGFR	VEGF	Lenvatinib

=== Intracellular receptors ===
Receptors may be classed based on their mechanism or on their position in the cell. 4 examples of intracellular LGIC are shown below:

Receptor	Ligand	Ion current
cyclic nucleotide-gated ion channels	cGMP (vision), cAMP and cGTP (olfaction)	Na^{+}, K^{+}
IP_{3} receptor	IP_{3}	Ca^{2+}
Intracellular ATP receptors	ATP (closes channel)	K^{+}
Ryanodine receptor	Ca^{2+}	Ca^{2+}

== Role in health and disease ==
=== In genetic disorders ===
Many genetic disorders involve hereditary defects in receptor genes. Often, it is hard to determine whether the receptor is nonfunctional or the hormone is produced at decreased level; this gives rise to the "pseudo-hypo-" group of endocrine disorders, where there appears to be a decreased hormonal level while in fact it is the receptor that is not responding sufficiently to the hormone.

=== In the immune system ===
The main receptors in the immune system are pattern recognition receptors (PRRs), toll-like receptors (TLRs), killer activated and killer inhibitor receptors (KARs and KIRs), complement receptors, Fc receptors, B cell receptors and T cell receptors.

== See also ==
- K_{i} Database
- Ion channel linked receptors
- Neuropsychopharmacology
- Schild regression for ligand receptor inhibition
- Signal transduction
- Stem cell marker
- List of MeSH codes (D12.776)
- Receptor theory
