= Everhardus Jacobus Ariëns =

Dutch pharmacologist (1918–2002)

- Born: 29 January 1918; Wijk bij Duurstede
- Died: 3 March 2002 (aged 84); Nijmegen
- Citizenship: Dutch
- Education: University of Utrecht
- Known for: receptor theory and drug stereochemistry
- Awards: Purkinje Medal (1963), Dr. Saal van Zwanenberg Prize (1972), Poulsson Medal of the Norwegian Society of Pharmacology (1973), Scheele Award (1974), Schmiedeberg-Medal (1980), Smissman Award of the American Chemical Society (1985)
- Scientific career
- Fields: Pharmacology
- Workplaces: Catholic University of Nijmegen

Everhardus Jacobus Ariëns (29 January 1918 – 3 March 2002) was a Dutch pharmacologist and professor at the Catholic University of Nijmegen (now Radboud University Nijmegen). He made significant contributions to understanding receptors function and the mathematical modeling of ligand–receptor interactions (receptor theory). Additionally, Ariëns was a pioneer in considering stereochemistry in drug development, including the development of enantiopure drugs.

== Early life ==
Ariëns grew up as the sixth of ten children in Wijk bij Duurstede. He went to school in Wageningen. Then he studied medicine at the University of Utrecht, followed by a doctorate of chemistry which he completed in 1942. After refusing to sign a declaration of loyalty to Germany, he escaped from the occupied Netherlands via Switzerland to England, where he enlisted in the U.S. Army. He completed his medical studies after the Second World War.

== Scientific activity ==
After World War II he worked in the laboratory of Prof. UG Bijlsma in the area of adrenergic substances and in 1950 both in the field of chemistry and medical doctorate. In 1951, Ariëns moved to Nijmegen after there at the Catholic University of the Faculty of Pharmacology was established. From 1954 until his retirement he was employed there as a professor.

Based on his dissertation, he developed together with Jacques van Rossum, a method for quantification of pharmacological effects as a result of ligand-receptor interactions. The thesis developed the concepts of receptor affinity and intrinsic activity. With the help of these terms he could describe the behavior of agonists and antagonists as well as the dual agonist / antagonist behavior of partial agonists. An important accomplishment of Ariëns was the establishment of experiments on isolated organs instead of the living animal (ex vivo), which quickly and reproducibly delivered data on the affinity and intrinsic activity of test substances.

Ariëns was also active in the field of structure-activity relationships (SAR), a branch of medicinal chemistry. With the provocative statement that the then commonly used racemates were drugs with 50% contamination, he triggered a debate among pharmacologists and medicinal chemists and alerted drug regulators. Ariëns was thus the crucial precursor for the targeted development of enantiopure drugs. Another, though less noticed controversy he started by expressing his view that drug metabolism is wasted and called for the development of metabolism-resistant drugs. In addition, he followed in the tradition of Dutch pharmacists to combat quackery.

== Honors and awards ==
Ariëns 1963 was honored at the second International Congress of Pharmacology in Prague with the Purkinje Medal. In 1970 he became member of the Royal Netherlands Academy of Arts and Sciences. He also received the Dr. Saal van Zwanenberg Award (1972), the Medal of the Norwegian Poulsson Pharmacological Society (1973), the Scheele Award (1974), the Schmiedeberg Medal (1980) and the Smissman Award of the American Chemical Society (1985). Ariëns was awarded honorary doctorates from universities Universidade Luterana do Brasil, University of Kiel, University of Paris-Sud and Università degli Studi di Camerino. Another honorary doctorate was awarded in March 2002 at the Ohio State University.
