= Hugo Leonardus Gerth van Wijk =

Dutch biologist, teacher and lexicographer

- Born: 21 October 1849; Wijk bij Duurstede, Utrecht, Netherlands
- Died: 30 November 1921 (aged 72); Amsterdam, Netherlands
- Resting place: Zorgvlied cemetery
- Citizenship: Dutch
- Occupations: Biology teacher; Biologist

Hugo Leonardus Gerth van Wijk (21 October 1849 – 30 November 1921) was a Dutch biologist, teacher, and lexicographer. He was an author of taxonomic literature, being one of only four Dutch botanical lexicographers of the last century.

== Biography ==
Hugo Leonardus was born on 21 October 1849 in Wijk bij Duurstede, Utrecht, as the son of Sara Johanna Verment (1805–1873) and Johannes Abraham Gerth van Wijk (1803–1873), who owned a boarding school in Duurstede. Two older brothers became linguists and theologians respectively, but there was not enough money for Hugo to also pursue a university education, so he instead followed the MO Opleiding Biologie, after which he was appointed biology teacher at the Rijks HBS, Stedelijk Gymnasium Middelburg on 16 September 1873, as successor to Herman van Hall. He was associated with both the Stedelijk Gymnasium and the Rijkskweekschool (both from 1879) until his retirement in 1914. At the time, Middelburg was an isolated and bourgeois city distant from everywhere.

Unbeknownst to his school environment, his great ambition was to compile a large botanical dictionary called A Dictionary of Plant Names, which he started around 1884 and occupied for him for the better part of three decades until it was published in Haarlem in 1911. He received an award for the dictionary from the Teylers Foundation in Haarlem and was appointed a member of the Dutch Society of Sciences, which published the Dictionary's second volume in 1916. Several years later, in 1971, an (unchanged) reprint appeared, with an introduction and biography by F.A. Stafleu. According to English botanist James Britten, his Dictionary is "the most comprehensive collection of plant names in existence".

He also started a 4-part biology textbook around 1884, which was published in Middelburg in 1887–88. On 1 January 1895, the Delpher newspaper published a report on the state of the high, middle, and primary schools, and his name was mentioned as the director of the Fort de Kock, a Dutch school in Indonesia, but this was a press mistake since it was his older brother Didericus who was the director of that school between 16 September 1873 and 1877.

== Personal life and death ==
Gerth van Wijk married Maria Johanna Tak (1851–), and the couple only had one son Frederik Gerth van Wijk born on 30 August 1880 in Middelburg, who left no children, and whose possessions were dispersed after his death.

Gerth van Wijk died on 30 November 1921, at the age of 72, but his obituary did not appear in any of the botanical or biological journals of the time, perhaps mainly because he kept himself somewhat outside the mainstream of Dutch botany during most of his life.

== Works ==
- Principles of plant and zoology (3 volumes) (Middelburg, 1887–88)
- A Dictionary of Plant Names (Haarlem, 1909) (Reprint: Amsterdam, 1971).
