= Receptor theory =

Receptor models to explain drug behavior

Receptor theory is the application of receptor models to explain drug behavior. Pharmacological receptor models preceded accurate knowledge of receptors by many years. John Newport Langley and Paul Ehrlich introduced the concept that receptors can mediate drug action at the beginning of the 20th century. Alfred Joseph Clark was the first to quantify drug-induced biological responses (specifically, f-mediated receptor activation). So far, nearly all of the quantitative theoretical modelling of receptor function has centred on ligand-gated ion channels and G protein-coupled receptors.

== History ==
=== The receptor concept ===
In 1901, Langley challenged the dominant hypothesis that drugs act at nerve endings by demonstrating that nicotine acted at sympathetic ganglia even after the degeneration of the severed preganglionic nerve endings. In 1905 he introduced the concept of a receptive substance on the surface of skeletal muscle that mediated the action of a drug. Langley postulated that these receptive substances were different in different species (citing the fact that nicotine-induced muscle paralysis in mammals was absent in crayfish). Around the same time, Ehrlich was trying to understand the basis of selectivity of agents. He theorized that selectivity was the basis of a preferential distribution of lead and dyes in different body tissues. However, he later modified the theory in order to explain immune reactions and the selectivity of the immune response. Thinking that selectivity was derived from interaction with the tissues themselves, Ehrlich envisaged molecules extending from cells that the body could use to distinguish and mount an immune response to foreign objects. However, it was only after Ahlquist demonstrated the differential effects of adrenaline on two distinct receptor populations, that the theory of receptor-mediated drug interactions gained acceptance.

=== Nature of receptor–drug interactions ===
==== Receptor occupancy model ====
The receptor occupancy model, which describes agonist and competitive antagonists, was built on the work of Langley, Hill, and Clark. The occupancy model was the first model put forward by Clark to explain the activity of drugs at receptors and quantified the relationship between drug concentration and observed effect. It is based on mass-action kinetics and attempts to link the action of a drug to the proportion of receptors occupied by that drug at equilibrium. In particular, the magnitude of the response is directly proportional to the amount of drug bound, and the maximum response would be elicited once all receptors were occupied at equilibrium. He applied mathematical approaches used in enzyme kinetics systematically to the effects of chemicals on tissues. He showed that for many drugs, the relationship between drug concentration and biological effect corresponded to a hyperbolic curve, similar to that representing the adsorption of a gas onto a metal surface and fitted the Hill–Langmuir equation. Clark, together with Gaddum, was the first to introduce the log concentration–effect curve and described the now-familiar 'parallel shift' of the log concentration–effect curve produced by a competitive antagonist. Attempts to separate the binding phenomenon and activation phenomenon were made by Ariëns in 1954 and by Stephenson in 1956 to account for the intrinsic activity (efficacy) of a drug (that is, its ability to induce an effect after binding). Classic occupational models of receptor activation failed to provide evidence to directly support the idea that receptor occupancy follows a Langmuir curve as the model assumed leading to the development of alternative models to explain drug behaviour.

===== Competitive inhibition models =====
The development of the classic theory of drug antagonism by Gaddum, Schild and Arunlakshana built on the work of Langley, Hill and Clark. Gaddum described a model for the competitive binding of two ligands to the same receptor in short communication to The Physiological Society in 1937. The description referred only to binding, it was not immediately useful for the analysis of experimental measurements of the effects of antagonists on the response to agonists. It was Heinz Otto Schild who made measurement of the equilibrium constant for the binding of an antagonist possible. He developed the Schild equation to determine a dose ratio, a measure of the potency of a drug. In Schild regression, the change in the dose ratio, the ratio of the EC_{50} of an agonist alone compared to the EC_{50} in the presence of a competitive antagonist as determined on a dose response curve used to determine the affinity of an antagonist for its receptor.

===== Agonist models =====
The flaw in Clark's receptor-occupancy model was that it was insufficient to explain the concept of a partial agonist. This led to the development of agonist models of drug action by Ariens in 1954 and by Stephenson in 1956 to account for the intrinsic activity (efficacy) of a drug (that is, its ability to induce an effect after binding).

=== Two-state receptor theory ===
The two-state model is a simple linear model to describe the interaction between a ligand and its receptor, but also the active receptor (R^{*}). The model uses an equilibrium dissociation constant to describe the interaction between ligand and receptor. It proposes that ligand binding results in a change in receptor state from an inactive to an active state based on the receptor's conformation. A receptor in its active state will ultimately elicit its biological response. It was first described by Black and Leff in 1983 as an alternative model of receptor activation. Similar to the receptor occupancy model, the theory originated from earlier work by del Castillo & Katz on observations relating to ligand-gated ion channels. In this model, agonists and inverse agonists are thought to have selective binding affinity for the pre-existing resting and active states or can induce a conformational change to a different receptor state. Whereas antagonists have no preference in their affinity for a receptor state. The fact that receptor conformation (state) would affect binding affinity of a ligand was used to explain a mechanism of partial agonism of receptors by del Castillo & Katz in 1957 was based on their work on the action of acetylcholine at the motor endplate build on similar work by Wyman & Allen in 1951 on conformational-induced changes in hemoglobin's oxygen binding affinity occurring as a result of oxygen binding. The del Castillo-Katz mechanism divorces the binding step (that can be made by agonists as well as antagonists) from the receptor activation step (that can be only exerted by agonists), describing them as two independent events.

=== Ternary complex model ===
The original Ternary complex model was used to describe ligand, receptor, and G-protein interactions. It uses equilibrium dissociation constants for the interactions between the receptor and each ligand (K_{a} for ligand A; K_{b} for ligand B), as well as a cooperativity factor (α) that denotes the mutual effect of the two ligands on each other's affinity for the receptor. An α > 1.0 refers to positive allosteric modulation, an α < 1.0 refers to negative allosteric modulation, and an α = 1.0 means that binding of either ligand to the receptor does not alter the affinity of the other ligand for the receptor (i.e., a neutral modulator). Further, the α parameter can be added as a subtle but highly useful extension to the ATCM in order to include effects of an allosteric modulator on the efficacy (as distinct from the affinity) of another ligand that binds the receptor, such as the orthosteric agonist. Some ligands can reduce the efficacy but increase the affinity of the orthosteric agonist for the receptor.

Although it is a simple assumption that the proportional amount of an active receptor state should correlate with the biological response, the experimental evidence for receptor overexpression and spare receptors suggests that the calculation of the net change in the active receptor state is a much better measure for response than is the fractional or proportional change. This is demonstrated by the effects of agonist/ antagonist combinations on the desensitization of receptors. This is also demonstrated by receptors that are activated by overexpression, since this requires a change between R and R* that is difficult to understand in terms of a proportional rather than a net change, and for the molecular model that fits with the mathematical model.

== Postulates of receptor theory ==
- Receptors must possess structural and steric specificity.
- Receptors are saturable and finite (limited number of binding sites)
- Receptors must possess high affinity for its endogenous ligand at physiological concentrations
- Once the endogenous ligand binds to the receptor, some early recognizable chemical event must occur
