= Johannes Alphonsus Huisman =

Dutch philologist (1919–2003)

- Born: 30 April 1919; Wijk bij Duurstede, Netherlands
- Died: 7 April 2003 (aged 83); Zeist, Netherlands

Academic background
- Education: University of Utrecht
- Doctoral advisor: Hendrik Sparnaay

Academic work
- Discipline: Germanic philology
- Sub-discipline: German philology
- Institutions: University of Utrecht
- Main interests: Early Germanic literature; Germanic Antiquity

Johannes Alphonsus Huisman (30 April 1919 – 7 February 2003), also known as J. A. Huisman, was a Dutch philologist who specialized in Germanic studies.

== Biography ==
Johannes Alphonsus Huisman was born in Wijk bij Duurstede, Netherlands on 30 April 1919. He received his Ph.D. in German philology at Utrecht University in 1950 under the supervision of Hendrik Sparnaay. In May 1953, Huisman was appointed Professor of Comparative Germanic Linguistics and the Languages and Literature of the Germanic Peoples. He retired from the University of Utrecht in September 1982. The festschrift Palaeogermanica et onomastica (1989) was published in honor of Huisman on his 70th birthday. Huisman died in Zeist, Netherlands on 7 February 2003.

== Selected works ==
- Neue Wege zur dichterischen und musikalischen Technik Walthers von der Vogelweide, 1950
- De hel-namen in Nederland, 1953
- De namen Betuwe en Veluwe, 1958
- Plaatsnamen van sacrale oorsprong, 1959
- Alliteratie in onze tijd, 1959
- Nette en onnette woorden, 1962
- Het Nederlands tussen dialect en wereldtaal, 1965
- Edda, 1980

== See also ==
- Jan de Vries (philologist)
- Edgar C. Polomé
- René Derolez
