= Gijsbert Bos =

Dutch footballer (born 1973)

Gijs Bos
Personal information
- Full name: Gijsbert Bos
- Date of birth: 22 February 1973 (age 53)
- Place of birth: Spakenburg, Netherlands
- Height: 6 ft 4 in (1.93 m)
- Position: Forward

Senior career*
Years	Team	Apps	(Gls)
1994–1996	IJsselmeervogels	36	(16)
1996–1997	Lincoln City	36	(10)
1997	→ Gateshead (loan)	10	(8)
1997–1998	Rotherham United	18	(4)
1998	→ Walsall (loan)	0	(0)
1998–1999	IJsselmeervogels	15	(7)
1999–2000	Huizen	24	(9)
2000–2001	Nunspeet	20	(10)
2001–2003	GVVV		
2003–2004	SDC Putten		
2004–2007	VV Eemdijk		
- * Club domestic league appearances and goals

Gijsbert Bos (born 22 February 1973) is a Dutch former professional footballer who played as a forward.

== Club career ==
A big forward, Bos played for hometown club IJsselmeervogels before moving abroad to play in the English Football League. He returned to Dutch amateur football in 1998.

He finished his career at Eemdijk in 2007.
