= SDC Putten =

Association football club

- Full name: Sterk Door Combinatie Putten
- Nickname: De Blauwen
- Founded: 1952
- Ground: Sportpark Puttereng, Putten
- Capacity: 3,000
- Chairman: Albert de Bruin
- Manager: Cesco Agterberg
- League: Eerste Klasse (2022–23)
Home colours	Away colours

Sterk Door Combinatie Putten (SDC Putten) is an association football club from Putten, Netherlands. It was founded in 1952.

== History ==
In 1966 SDC Putten promoted from the Tweede Klasse to the Hoofdklasse. Since, it plays predominantly in the Hoofdklasse with some seasons in the Eerste Klasse. In 2022–23, SDC Putten plays in the Eerste Klasse.

SDC Putten reached the Round of 32 of the 2010–11 KNVB Cup.

=== Notable players ===
- Gijsbert Bos
- Evert Brouwers
- Dimitri Djollo
- Sander Duits
- Giovanni Hiwat
- Dick Kooijman

== See also ==
- Category:SDC Putten players
