= Dick Kooijman =

Dutch footballer

Personal information
- Date of birth: 10 November 1972 (age 53)
- Place of birth: Wijk bij Duurstede, Netherlands
- Position: Defensive midfielder

Senior career*
Years	Team	Apps	(Gls)
1993–94	Heracles Almelo	28	(23)
1994–95	FC Groningen	19	(0)
1995–97	AZ	43	(8)
1997–99	FC Emmen	65	(10)
1999–2003	Go Ahead Eagles	111	(28)
2003–05	De Graafschap	34	(3)
2005–06	SDC Putten	-	(-)
2006–07	AGOVV Apeldoorn	22	(0)
2007–08	Sparta Nijkerk	-	(-)
	Total:	322	(72 )
- * Club domestic league appearances and goals

Dick Kooijman (born 10 November 1972 in Wijk bij Duurstede) is a Dutch footballer currently playing for AGOVV Apeldoorn in the Eerste Divisie. He played as a defensive midfielder.

== Biography ==
Kooijman's football career began with Heracles Almelo in the 1993–94 season. The next season Kooijman played with FC Groningen and later with AZ from 1995 until 1997. FC Emmen was his next club where he played until 1999. Following that club, he moved to Go Ahead Eagles until 2003. He was transferred to De Graafschap where he played until 2005.

Kooijman moved to SDC Putten in the 2005–06 season. He switched to AGOVV Apeldoorn in 2006. Kooijman played in Sparta Nijkerk in 2007–08.
