= Dimitri Djollo =

Dutch footballer

Personal information
- Full name: Dimitri Djollo
- Date of birth: 14 October 1977 (age 49)
- Place of birth: Ouragahio, Ivory Coast
- Position: Striker

Youth career
- Geinoord
- FC Utrecht

Senior career*
Years	Team	Apps	(Gls)
2007–2010	TOP Oss	14	(1)
2010–2011	GVVV		
2011–2014	Sportlust '46		
2014–2015	Sparta Nijkerk		
2015–2016	SDC Putten		
2016–2018	Geinoord		
- * Club domestic league appearances and goals as of 26 October 2020

Dimitri Djollo (born 5 May 1988) is a Dutch retired footballer who played for Dutch Eerste Divisie club TOP Oss during the 2007–10 seasons. He then embarked on a career in amateur football.

== Club career ==
Born in Ivory Coast, Djollo came to Holland aged 6 and began playing football with SV Geinoord before signing with FC Utrecht's youth team. Djollo made his professional debut with TOP Oss and after three seasons with the club, he joined GVVV in 2010.

He later played for Sportlust '46 and Sparta Nijkerk and in summer 2015, Djollo left Sparta Nijkerk for fellow amateur side SDC Putten. Djollo finished his career at first club Geinoord in 2018.
