= Bacteriophage PBC1 =

Bacillus virus PBC1

Virus classification
- (unranked): Virus
- Realm: Duplodnaviria
- Kingdom: Heunggongvirae
- Phylum: Uroviricota
- Class: Caudoviricetes
- Order: Caudovirales
- Family: Siphoviridae
- Genus: Pebcunavirus
- Species: Bacillus virus PBC1

Bacteriophage PBC1 is a bacteriophage that infects the spore-forming bacterium Bacillus cereus.
