= Wijk bij Duurstede =

Municipality in Utrecht, Netherlands

- Municipality
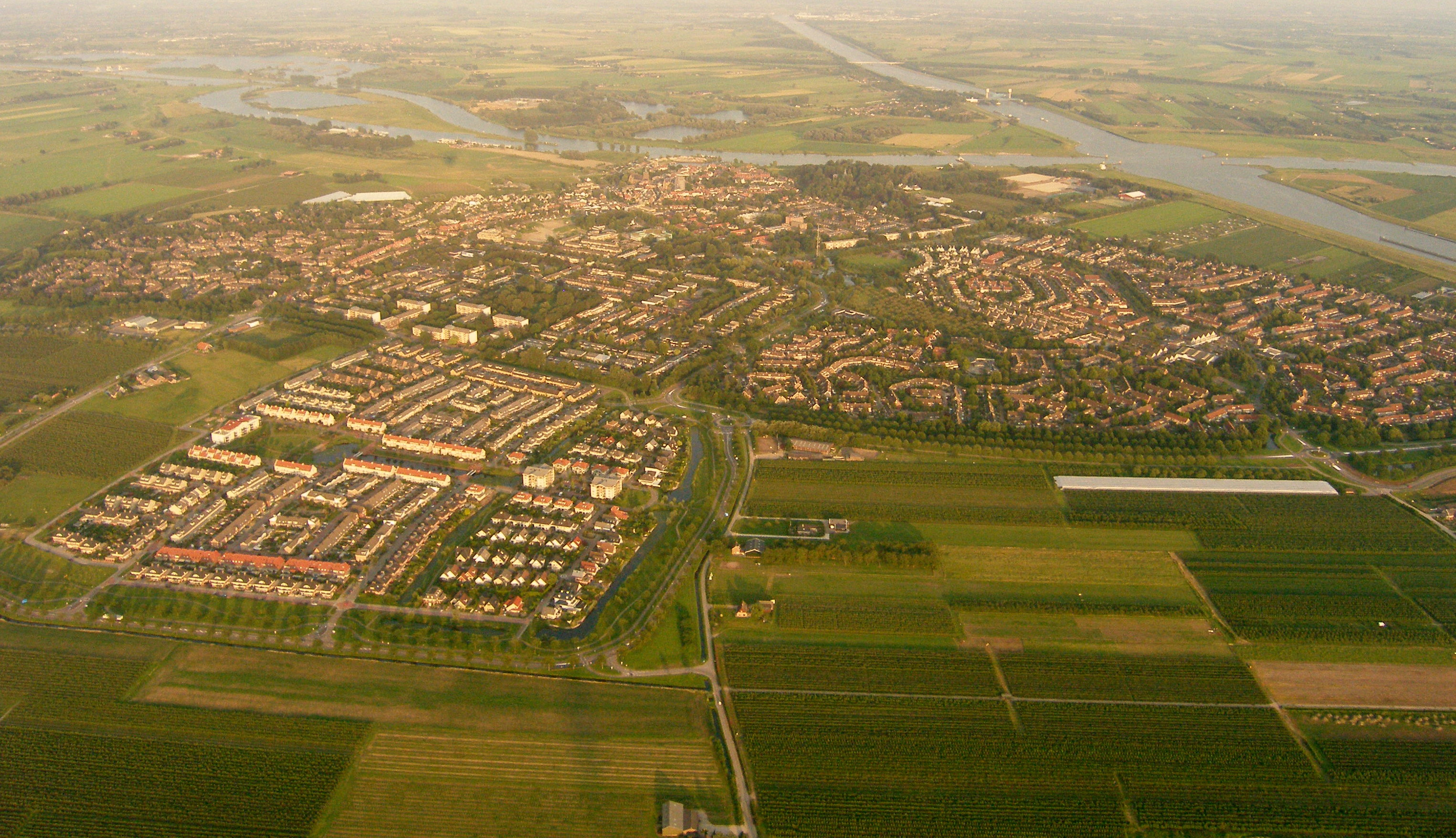
- Aerial view of Wijk bij Duurstede

- Flag Coat of arms

- Location in Utrecht

- Location of Wijk bij Duurstede
- Coordinates: 51°59′N 5°20′E
- Country: Netherlands
- Province: Utrecht

Government
  - Body: Municipal council

Area
  - Total: 50.40 km^{2} (19.46 sq mi)
  - Land: 47.62 km^{2} (18.39 sq mi)
  - Water: 2.78 km^{2} (1.07 sq mi)
- Elevation: 5 m (16 ft)

Population (January 2021)
  - Total: 23,925
  - Density: 502/km^{2} (1,300/sq mi)
- Time zone: UTC+1 (CET)
  - Summer (DST): UTC+2 (CEST)
- Postcode: 3945–3947, 3960–3962
- Area code: 0343
- Website: www.wijkbijduurstede.nl

Wijk bij Duurstede (Dutch pronunciation: [ˈʋɛiɡ bɛi ˈdyːrsteːdə]) is a municipality and a city in the central Netherlands.

== Population centres ==
- Cothen
- Langbroek
- Wijk bij Duurstede

=== Topography ===
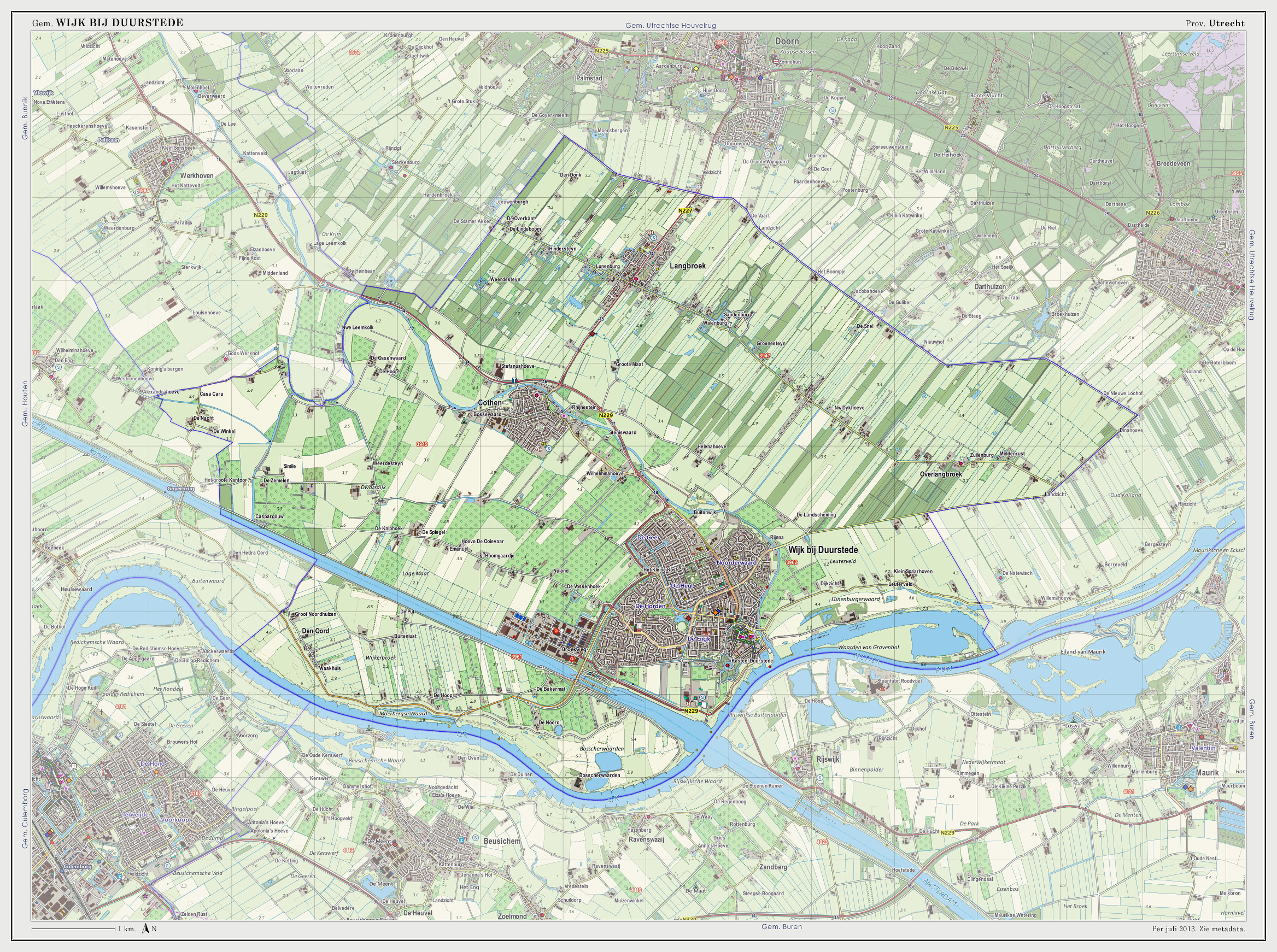

Dutch Topographic map of the municipality of Wijk bij Duurstede, 2013.

== City ==
The city (population as of 2007: 23,377) is located on the Rhine. At Wijk bij Duurstede, the Kromme Rijn (Crooked Rhine) branches off, and the main branch is called Lek River downstream from Wijk bij Duurstede.

The name 'Wijk bij Duurstede' means 'Neighbourhood by Duurstede'. Duurstede is the name of the nearby castle/ruin, also called Dorestad, where the bishop of Utrecht used to live. Wijk bij Duurstede is the former location of Dorestad, an important Frisian trade settlement during Carolingian times that was pillaged around 850 by the Vikings.

Wijk bij Duurstede has the only drive-through wind mill in the world. The mill is often confused with the mill that was made famous by Ruisdael's 1670 painting The windmill at Wijk bij Duurstede, but that mill no longer exists (its foundations can still be seen a couple of blocks away from the remaining mill). At the market place of Wijk bij Duurstede is one of the few church towers in the Netherlands with a flat roof, as built because the bishop could not afford to build a spire. Inside the tower a picture displays the planned construction of the tower. The tower was supposed to become higher than the Domtoren in Utrecht.

Wijk bij Duurstede received city rights in 1300.

== Notable people ==
- Rorik of Dorestad (ca.810– ca.880) Danish Viking who ruled over parts of Frisia 841-873
- Dirck van Baburen (ca.1595–1624) painter of the Utrecht School
- Thomas van Rhee (1634–1701) colonial administrator, 13th Governor of Dutch Ceylon
- Hugo Leonardus Gerth van Wijk (1849–1921) biologist, teacher, and lexicographer
- Dirk Fock (1858–1941) politician and diplomat, Governor-General of the Dutch East Indies 1921–1926
- Gerrit Achterberg (1905–1962) poet
- Everhardus Jacobus Ariëns (1918–2002) pharmacologist and academic
- Johannes Alphonsus Huisman (1919–2003), philologist
- Dick Kooijman (born 1972) footballer with 322 club caps
- Esmee Kosterman (born 2005), racing driver

== Gallery ==
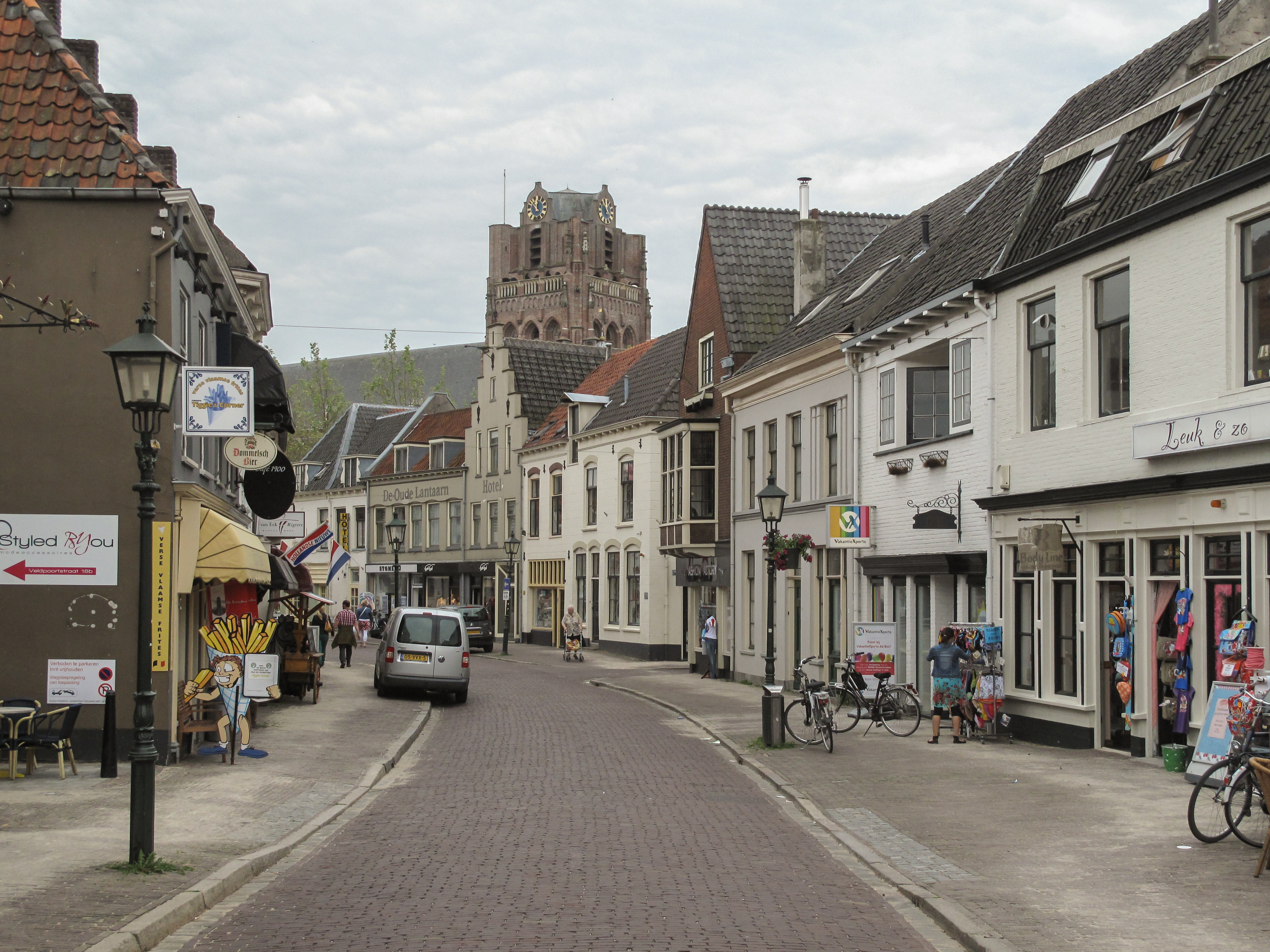
Wijk bij Duurstede, street to the churchtower

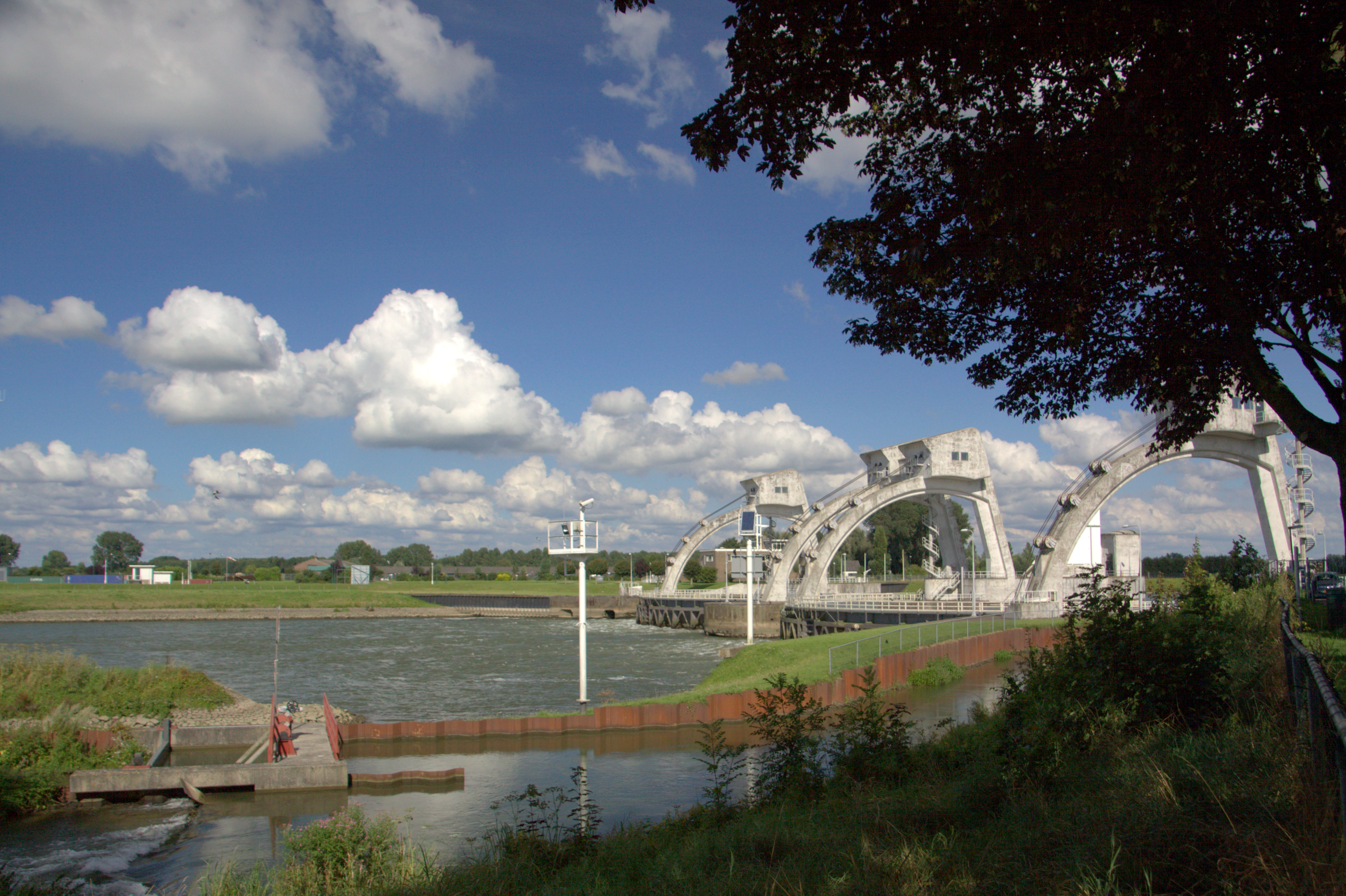
The weir in the river Lek near Hagestein

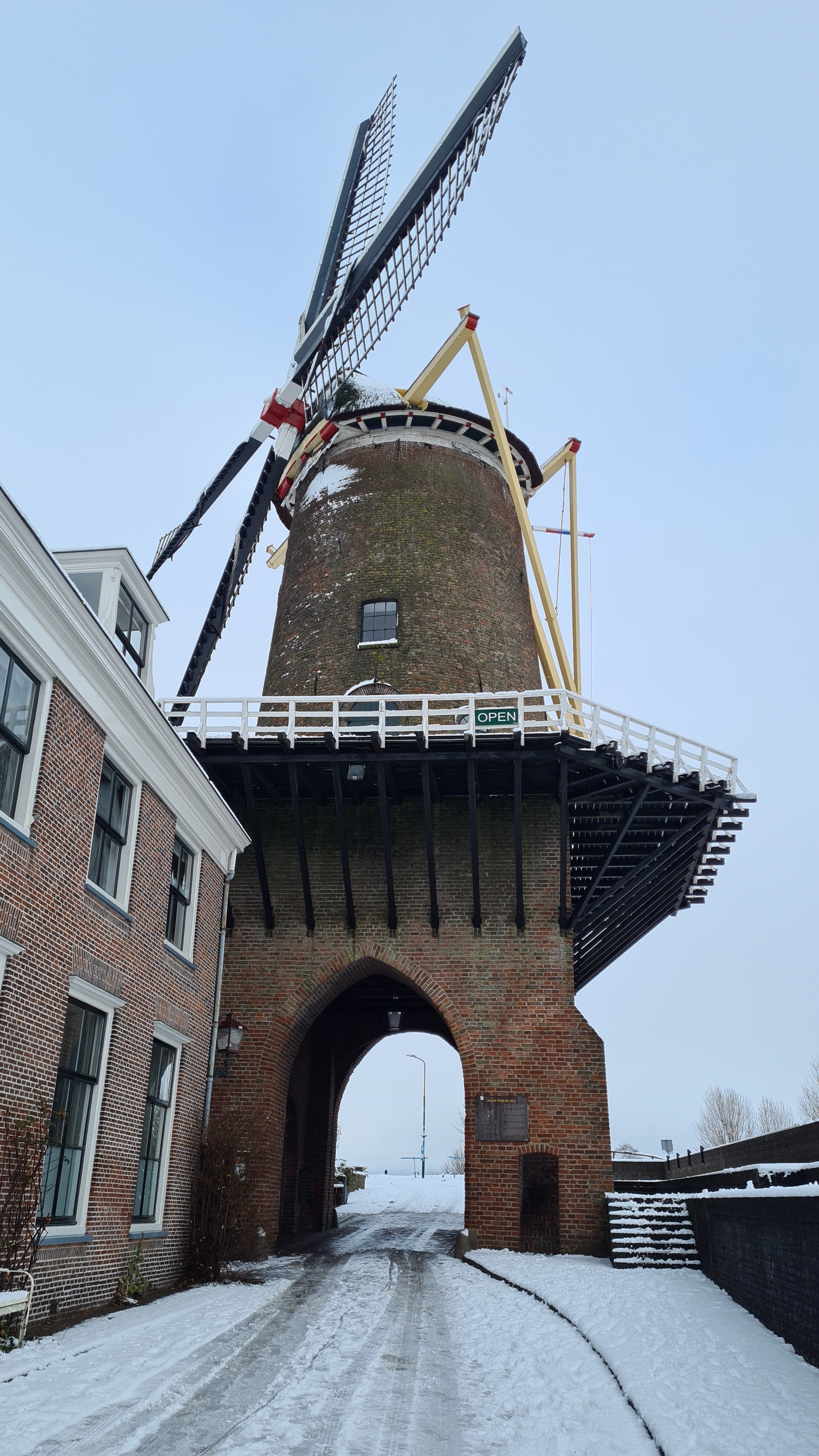
Wijk bij Duurstede, windmill (molen Rijn en Lek) in the street

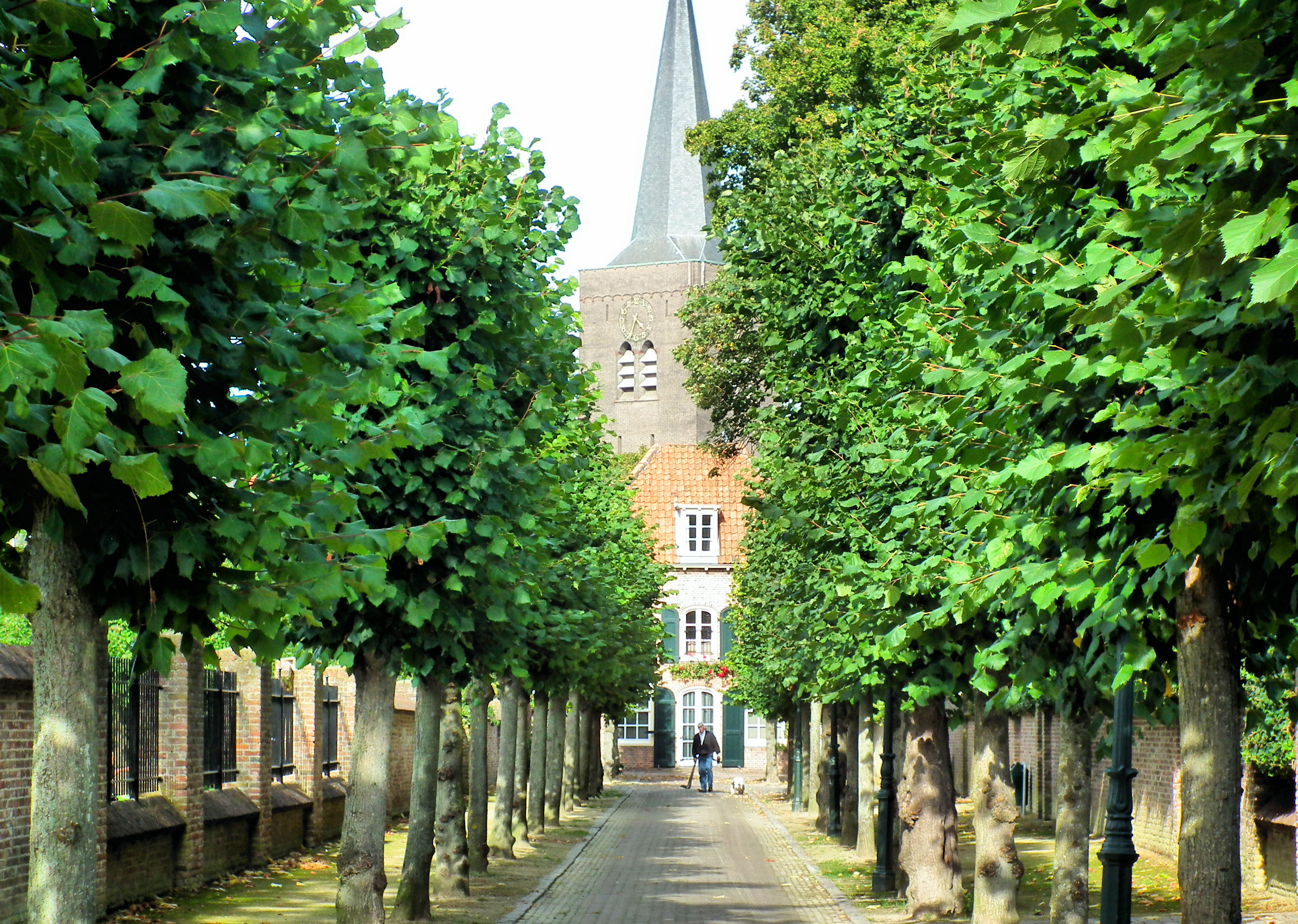
Wijk bij Duurstede

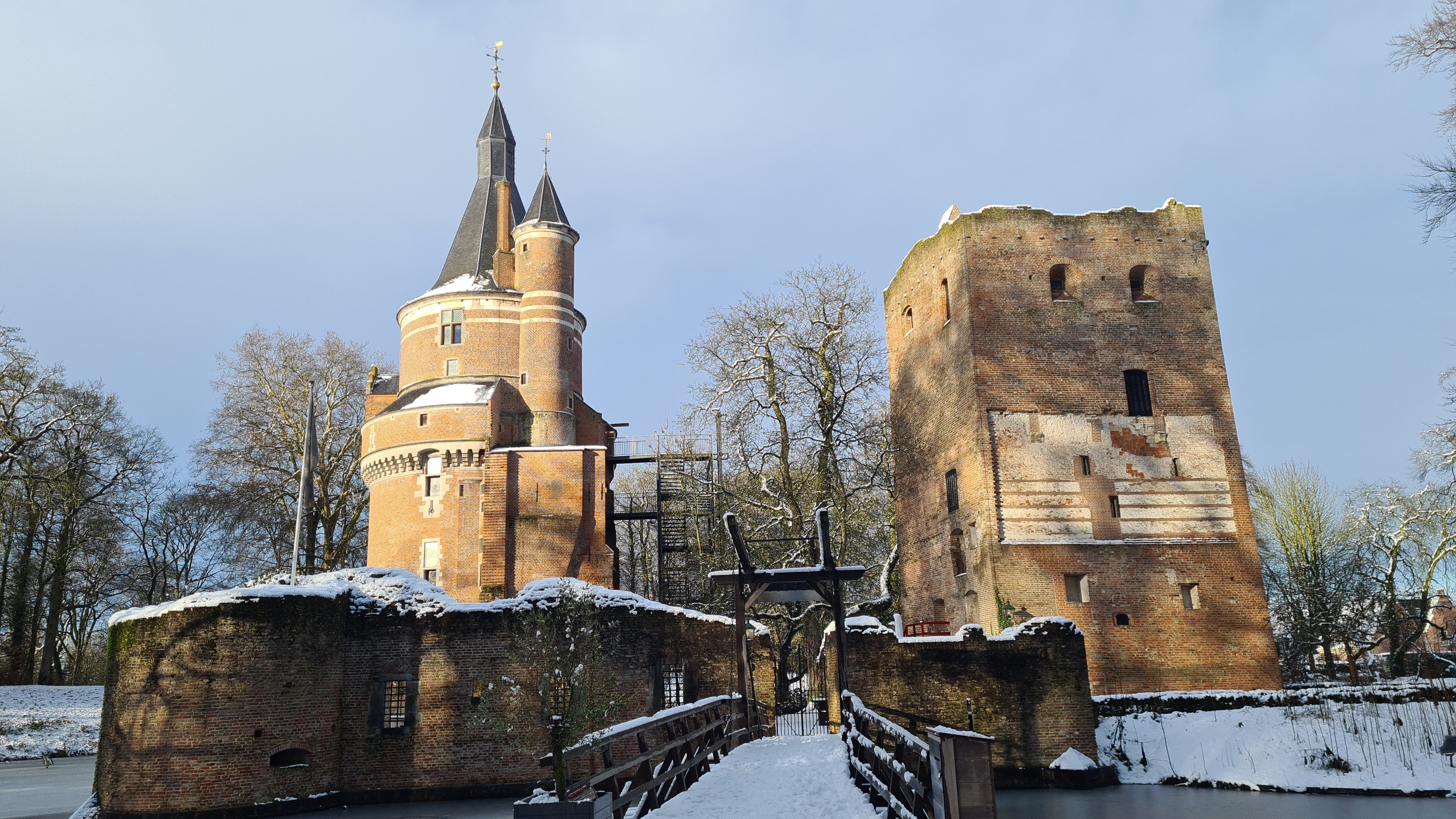
Castle: kasteel Duurstede

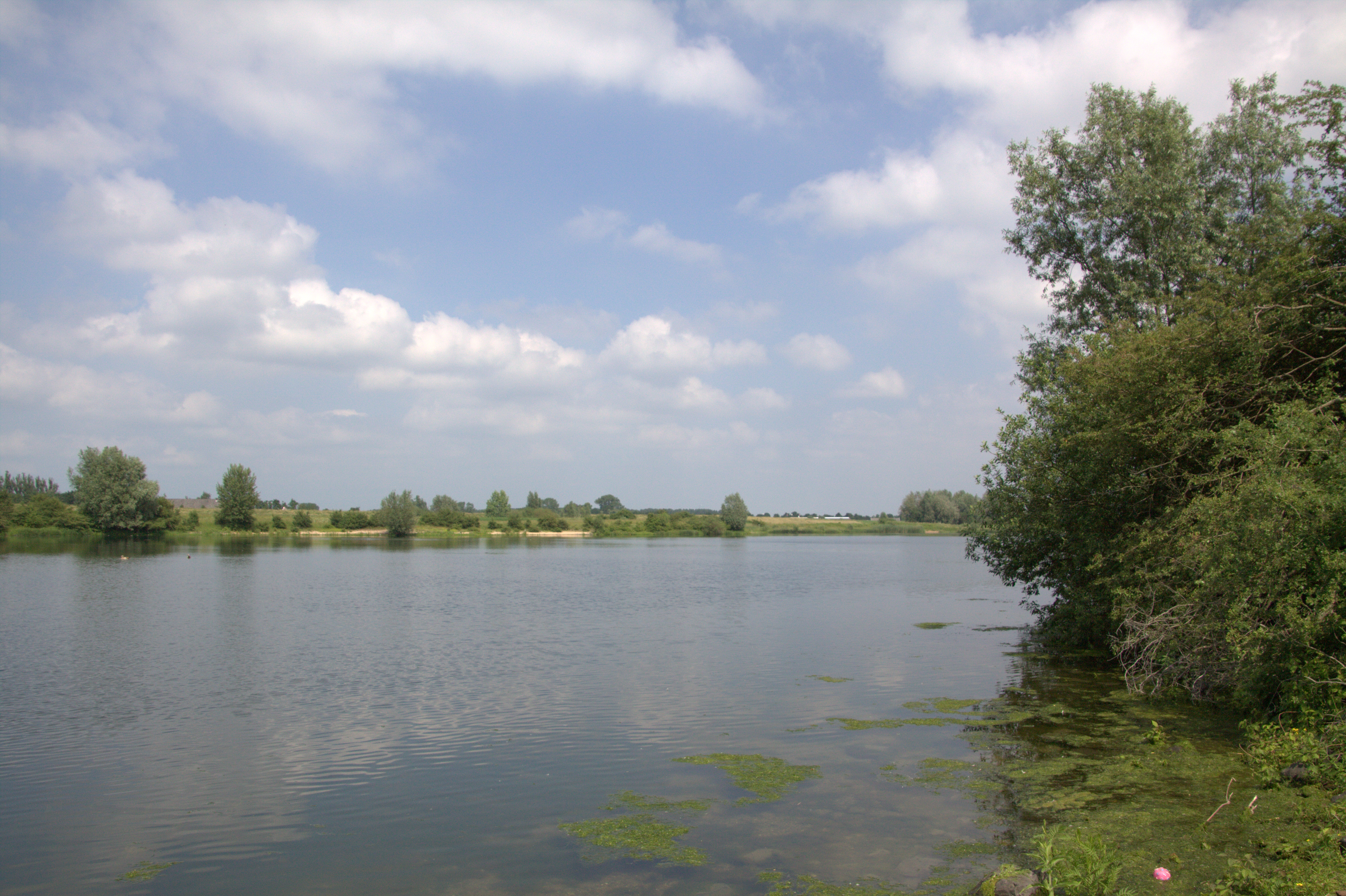
Neder-Rijn bij Wijk bij Duurstede

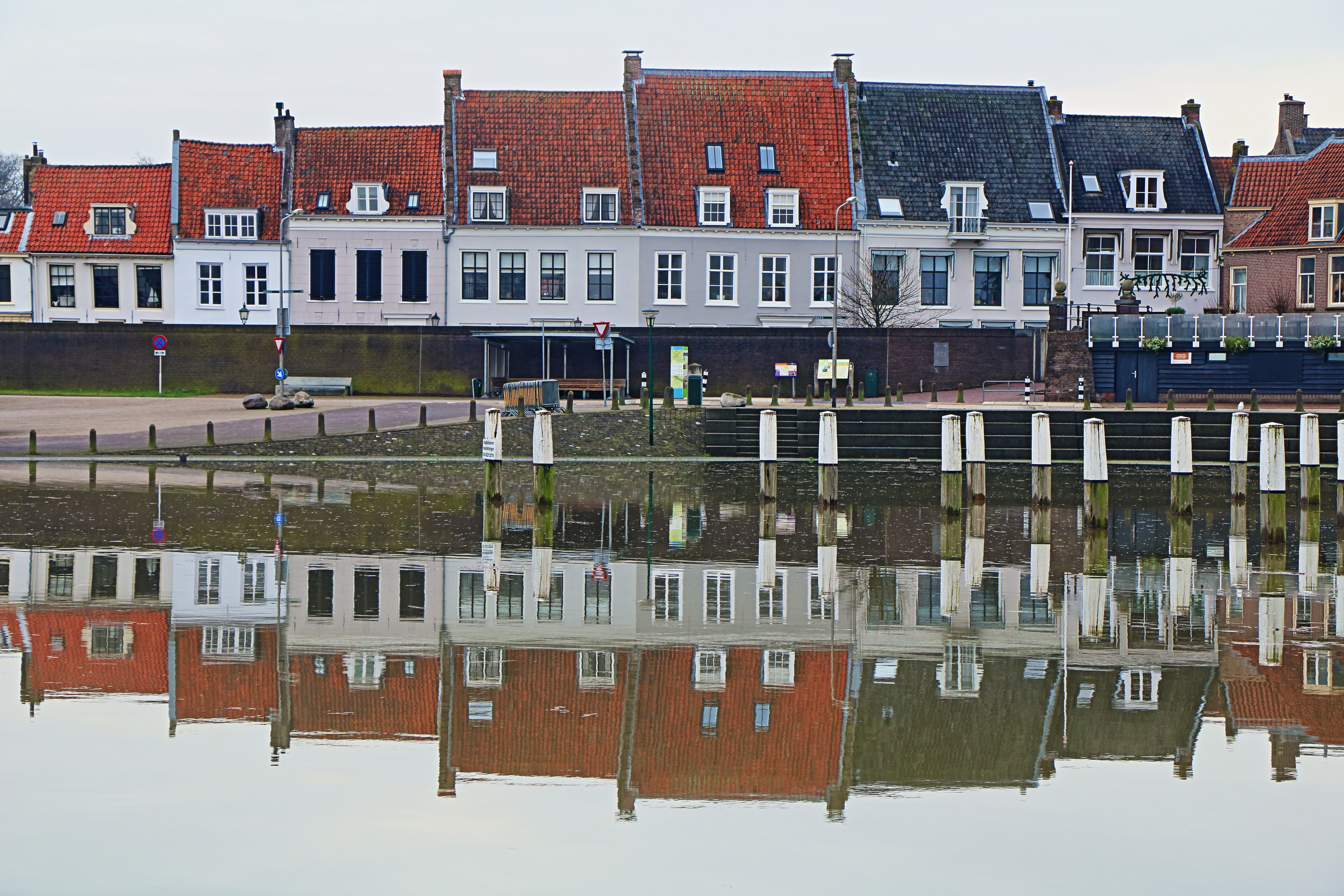
Wijk bij Duurstede, water in de Stadshaven

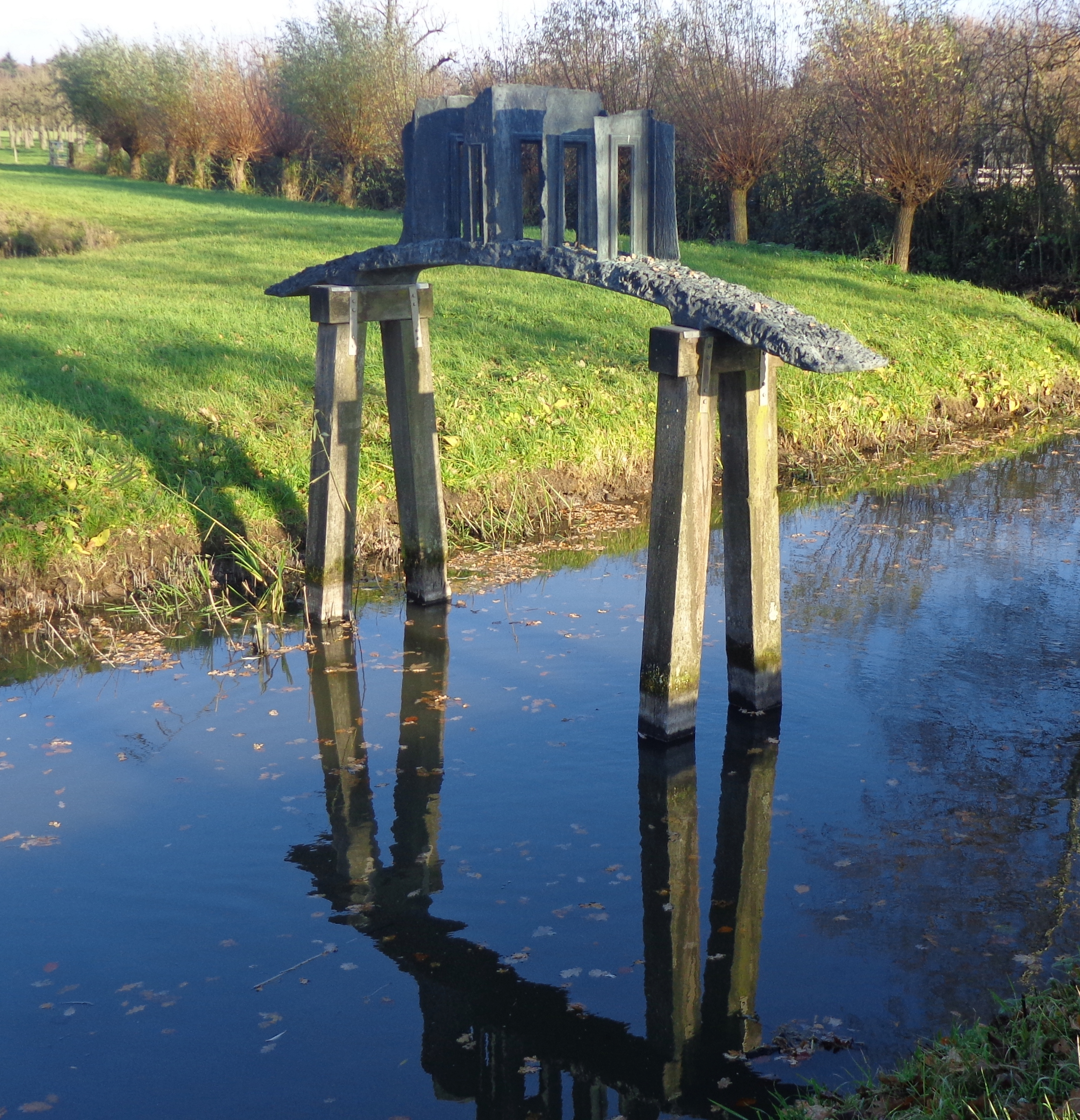
Langbroek Bebouwde Brug Cor Litjens
