= Evert Brouwers =

Dutch footballer

Personal information
- Date of birth: 17 June 1990 (age 36)
- Place of birth: Zeist, Netherlands
- Position: Striker

Senior career*
Years	Team	Apps	(Gls)
2010–2012	FC Utrecht	3	(0)
2012	AGOVV	0	(0)
2013-2014	DOVO		
2014-2015	SDC Putten		
2015-2017	SV Zeist		
2017-2018	Eemdijk		
2018-2019	DHSC		
2019-2020	Sportlust '46		
2020-2022	SV Zeist		
- * Club domestic league appearances and goals as of 22:10, 31 January 2017 (UTC)

Evert Brouwers (born 17 June 1990) is a Dutch former professional footballer.

== Club career ==
He made his senior debut for Utrecht in the 2010–11 season. After AGOVV dissolved, Brouwers played for Hoofdklasse clubs DOVO and SDC Putten before joining his first club Zeist in 2015. In summer 2016 he was ready to return to SDC Putten after completing his studies, only to change his mind after finding a job as a baker which prevented him from playing on Saturdays.

He later also played for Eemdijk, DHSC and Sportlust '46.
