= Sander Duits =

Dutch football manager (born 1983)

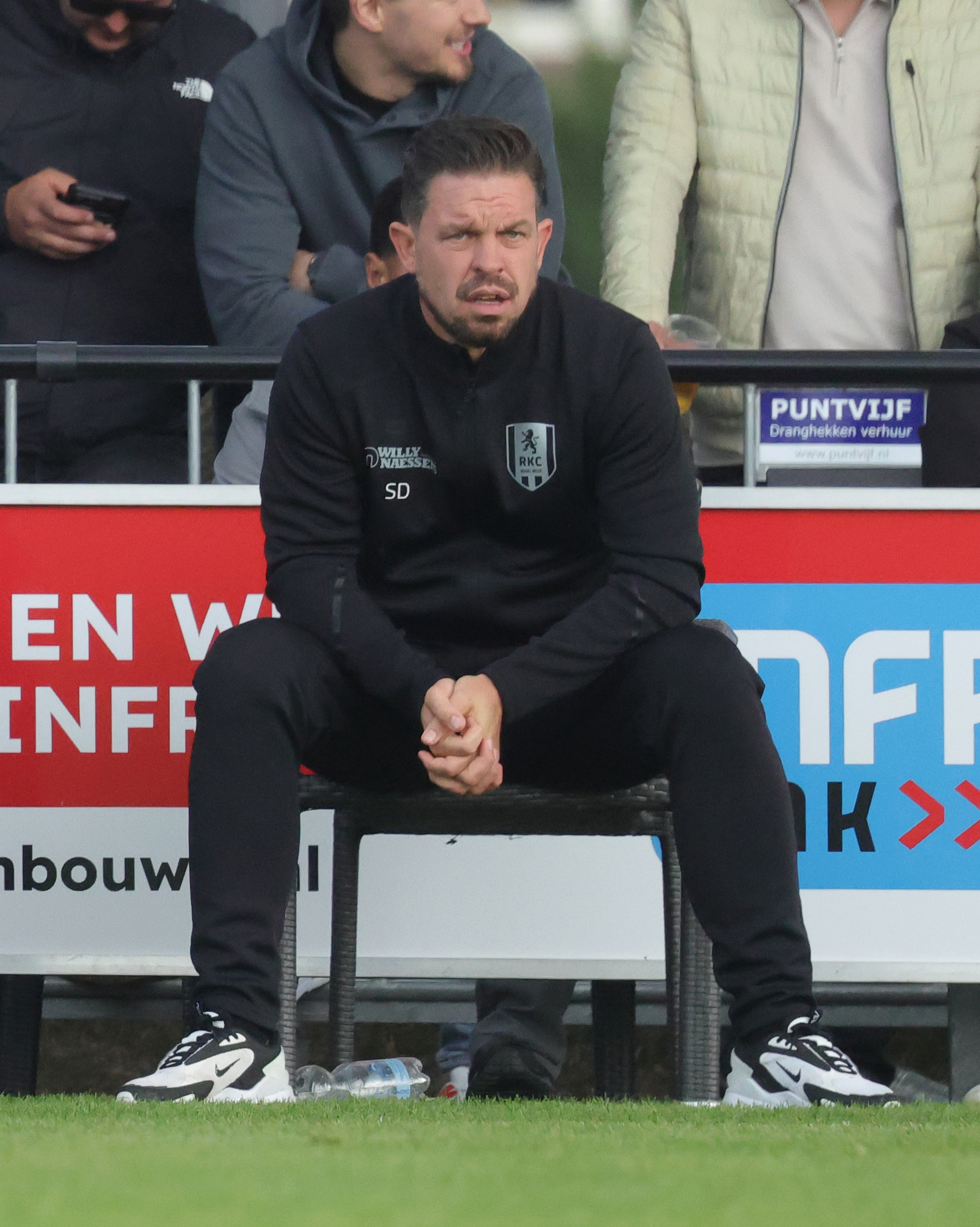
- Duits managing RKC Waalwijk in 2025

Personal information
- Date of birth: 29 August 1983 (age 43)
- Place of birth: Putten, Netherlands
- Height: 1.83 m (6 ft 0 in)
- Position: Midfielder

Team information
- Current team: RKC (head coach)

Youth career
- SDC Putten
- 1995–1998: Vitesse
- 1999–2002: De Graafschap

Senior career*
| Years | Team | Apps | (Gls) |
| 2002–2006 | De Graafschap | 67 | (5) |
| 2006–2010 | Omniworld | 132 | (32) |
| 2010–2014 | RKC | 122 | (15) |
| 2014–2017 | Go Ahead Eagles | 84 | (4) |
| 2017–2019 | SDC Putten | | |
| Total | | 405+ | (56+) |

Managerial career
- 2019–2023: RKC (asst.)
- 2023–2025: Twente (asst.)
- 2025–: RKC
- * Club domestic league appearances and goals

Sander Duits (born 29 August 1983) is a Dutch football manager and former professional footballer who is the head coach of Eerste Divisie club RKC Waalwijk.

As a central midfielder during his playing career, Duits represented De Graafschap, Omniworld, RKC Waalwijk, and Go Ahead Eagles. He notably won the Eerste Divisie title with RKC Waalwijk in the 2010–11 season, subsequently playing several seasons in the Eredivisie. Following retirement from professional football in 2017 due to persistent knee issues, he transitioned into coaching and served as an assistant at RKC Waalwijk and Twente before becoming head coach at RKC Waalwijk in 2025.

== Playing career ==
=== De Graafschap ===
Duits began his football career at local amateur club SDC Putten before joining the youth academy of Vitesse. He moved to De Graafschap in 1999, making his professional debut in the 2002–03 Eredivisie season under head coach Peter Bosz. His first appearance came on 1 December 2002, starting in a 1–1 away draw against his former club Vitesse; he was substituted after 63 minutes for Damien Hertog. Duits featured eight times during his debut season, which ended in De Graafschap's relegation to the Eerste Divisie.

Following relegation, Duits became a regular starter under Frans Adelaar, playing a crucial role as the club secured promotion back to the Eredivisie via the promotion play-offs in the 2003–04 season. However, under new coach Gert Kruys, he lost his regular starting position during the subsequent Eredivisie campaign and was temporarily demoted to the reserves. Although Kruys departed after another relegation, Duits faced competition from newly signed defender Joost Volmer and emerging talent Dave Bus. Despite limited appearances, he continued to play due to injuries affecting teammate John van Loenhout.

=== Omniworld ===
In the summer of 2006, Duits's contract expired, and he signed for Omniworld, where he established himself as a key midfielder and leading goalscorer. Despite his strong performances, a move to an Eredivisie club did not materialise, partly attributed to disciplinary concerns—he accumulated a league-high 13 yellow cards during the 2008–09 season.

=== RKC Waalwijk ===
In April 2010, Duits joined RKC Waalwijk on a three-year contract, aiming for an immediate return to the Eredivisie following their relegation. Under head coach Ruud Brood, Duits became integral to RKC's successful 2010–11 campaign, contributing seven goals as the club won the Eerste Divisie title. Returning to the Eredivisie, he remained influential, notably scoring from distance against Groningen and PSV during the 2011–12 season. However, after three seasons in the top flight, RKC were relegated again in May 2014 after losing to Excelsior in the relegation play-offs.

=== Go Ahead Eagles ===
On 28 August 2014, Duits moved to Eredivisie club Go Ahead Eagles, debuting one day later on his 31st birthday, as a substitute for Peter van Ooijen in a match against Willem II. After Go Ahead Eagles' relegation via the 2015 relegation play-offs, he helped the club return immediately to the Eredivisie via the 2016 promotion play-offs.

=== Later years ===
Persistent knee issues led Duits to retire from professional football in 2017. He returned to amateur football with childhood club SDC Putten, officially concluding his playing career on 29 June 2019 after appearing in a friendly match against Feyenoord, where he was substituted off in the 55th minute.

== Style of play ==
Duits operated chiefly as a control-orientated central midfielder. Preview material published by ADO Den Haag in 2013 described him as a "bikkelaar pur sang" (all-action battler) who combined an excellent passing range with a "snoeihard schot"—a powerful shot from distance. He was comfortable receiving possession under pressure, providing a steady outlet in build-up play, and was regarded as one of RKC Waalwijk's "certainty picks" in the heart of midfield.

Former Go Ahead Eagles assistant-coach Michel Boerebach praised Duits's technical security, calling him "absolutely one of the best players" he had worked with and noting that "nobody at the club was as truly two-footed". This ambidexterity, combined with his ability to retain the ball and act as an attacking pivot, made him a reliable link between defence and attack.

Duits was also known for striking the ball accurately from range; an example was his 17-minute opener against Groningen on 5 November 2011, a long-range effort that secured RKC a point. Set pieces—particularly penalties—were another facet of his game, with contemporary match reports noting the composure with which he converted spot-kicks for FC Omniworld.

His combative style occasionally tested disciplinary boundaries. While at Omniworld he collected 13 yellow cards during the 2008–09 Eerste Divisie season, a tally that equalled the division's single-season record at that time.

== Coaching career ==
Duits began coaching in the 2019–20 season, joining RKC Waalwijk as assistant to head coach Fred Grim. He retained the position under Grim's successor Joseph Oosting, serving on the Eredivisie club's technical staff until mid‑2023.

When Oosting was appointed head coach of Twente in June 2023, Duits followed him to Enschede as one of his assistants, working at the club for the 2023–24 and 2024–25 campaigns.

On 29 April 2025, Duits was appointed head coach of RKC Waalwijk, the club with which he had won the Eerste Divisie title as a player in 2011. He signed a two‑year contract, succeeding Henk Fraser, and took charge ahead of the 2025–26 Eerste Divisie campaign.

== Career statistics ==
=== Club ===
Appearances and goals by club, season and competition
| Club | Season | League | | | KNVB Cup | | Europe | | Other | | Total | |
| Club | Season | Division | Apps | Goals | Apps | Goals | Apps | Goals | Apps | Goals | Apps | Goals |
|---|---|---|---|---|---|---|---|---|---|---|---|---|
| Jong De Graafschap | 1999–2000 | Reservecompetitie | — | | 1 | 1 | — | | — | | 1 | 1 |
| De Graafschap | 2002–03 | Eredivisie | 8 | 1 | 0 | 0 | — | | — | | 8 | 1 |
| De Graafschap | 2003–04 | Eerste Divisie | 26 | 3 | 0 | 0 | 0 | 0 | 3 (Note: Appearances in Eredivisie promotion/relegation playoffs) | 0 | 29 | 3 |
| De Graafschap | 2004–05 | Eredivisie | 6 | 1 | 0 | 0 | 0 | 0 | 5 | 1 | 11 | 2 |
| De Graafschap | 2005–06 | Eerste Divisie | 27 | 0 | 0 | 0 | 0 | 0 | 0 | 0 | 27 | 0 |
| De Graafschap | Total | | 67 | 5 | 0 | 0 | 0 | 0 | 8 | 1 | 75 | 6 |
| FC Omniworld | 2006–07 | Eerste Divisie | 35 | 7 | 1 | 1 | — | | — | | 36 | 8 |
| FC Omniworld | 2007–08 | Eerste Divisie | 36 | 12 | 1 | 0 | — | | — | | 37 | 12 |
| FC Omniworld | 2008–09 | Eerste Divisie | 31 | 8 | 1 | 1 | — | | — | | 32 | 9 |
| FC Omniworld | 2009–10 | Eerste Divisie | 30 | 5 | 1 | 0 | — | | — | | 31 | 5 |
| FC Omniworld | Total | | 132 | 32 | 4 | 2 | 0 | 0 | 0 | 0 | 136 | 34 |
| RKC Waalwijk | 2010–11 | Eerste Divisie | 28 | 3 | 4 | 0 | — | | — | | 32 | 3 |
| RKC Waalwijk | 2011–12 | Eredivisie | 29 | 2 | 4 | 0 | — | | 4 | 0 | 37 | 2 |
| RKC Waalwijk | 2012–13 | Eredivisie | 31 | 4 | 2 | 0 | — | | — | | 33 | 4 |
| RKC Waalwijk | 2013–14 | Eredivisie | 30 | 6 | 1 | 0 | — | | 4 | 1 | 35 | 7 |
| RKC Waalwijk | 2014–15 | Eerste Divisie | 3 | 0 | 0 | 0 | — | | — | | 3 | 0 |
| RKC Waalwijk | Total | | 122 | 15 | 11 | 0 | — | | 8 | 1 | 141 | 16 |
| Go Ahead Eagles | 2014–15 | Eredivisie | 23 | 0 | 2 | 0 | — | | 0 | 0 | 25 | 0 |
| Go Ahead Eagles | 2015–16 | Eerste Divisie | 31 | 1 | 0 | 0 | 2 (Note: Appearances in UEFA Europa League) | 0 | 3 | 1 | 36 | 2 |
| Go Ahead Eagles | 2016–17 | Eredivisie | 30 | 3 | 0 | 0 | — | | — | | 30 | 3 |
| Go Ahead Eagles | Total | | 84 | 4 | 2 | 0 | 2 | 0 | 3 | 1 | 91 | 5 |
| SDC Putten | 2017–18 | Saturday Hoofdklasse B | ? | ? | 3 | 0 | — | | ? | ? | 3 | 0 |
| Career total | | | 405+ | 56+ | 21 | 3 | 2 | 0 | 19+ | 3+ | 447+ | 62+ |

=== Managerial ===
As of match played 20 February 2026

Managerial record by team and tenure
| Team | From | To | Record | | | | |
| Team | From | To | P | W | D | L | Win % |
|---|---|---|---|---|---|---|---|
| RKC Waalwijk | 1 July 2025 | Present | 31 | 12 | 8 | 11 | 38.71 |
| Total | | | 31 | 12 | 8 | 11 | 38.71 |

== Honours ==
RKC Waalwijk:

- Eerste Divisie: 2010–11
