= Cereulide =

Names
- IUPAC name cyclo[D-alanyl-N-oxa-L-valyl-L-valyl-N-oxa-D-leucyl-D-alanyl-N-oxa-L-valyl-L-valyl-N-oxa-D-leucyl-D-alanyl-N-oxa-L-valyl-L-valyl-N-oxa-D-leucyl]
- Other names 1,7,13,19,25,31-Hexaoxa-4,10,16,22,28,34-hexaazacyclohexatriacontane, cyclic peptide derivate; Cyclo(D-alanyl-3-methyl-L-2-hydroxybutanoyl-L-valyl-4-methyl-D-2-hydroxypentanoyl-D-alanyl-3-methyl-L-2-hydroxybutanoyl-L-valyl-4-methyl-D-2-hydroxypentanoyl-D-alanyl-3-methyl-L-2-hydroxybutanoyl-L-valyl-4-methyl-D-2-hydroxypentanoyl)

Identifiers
CAS Number	157232-64-9
3D model (JSmol)	Interactive image
ChemSpider	8232646
PubChem CID	10057089
CompTox Dashboard (EPA)	DTXSID301336059
- InChI: InChI=1S/C57H96N6O18/c1-25(2)22-37-46(64)58-34(19)52(70)79-44(32(15)16)50(68)62-41(29(9)10)56(74)77-39(24-27(5)6)48(66)60-36(21)54(72)81-45(33(17)18)51(69)63-42(30(11)12)57(75)78-38(23-26(3)4)47(65)59-35(20)53(71)80-43(31(13)14)49(67)61-40(28(7)8)55(73)76-37/h25-45H,22-24H2,1-21H3,(H,58,64)(H,59,65)(H,60,66)(H,61,67)(H,62,68)(H,63,69)/t34-,35-,36-,37-,38-,39-,40+,41+,42+,43+,44+,45+/m1/s1 Key: JWWAHGUHYLWQCQ-UHZBFKKDSA-N; InChI=1/C57H96N6O18/c1-25(2)22-37-46(64)58-34(19)52(70)79-44(32(15)16)50(68)62-41(29(9)10)56(74)77-39(24-27(5)6)48(66)60-36(21)54(72)81-45(33(17)18)51(69)63-42(30(11)12)57(75)78-38(23-26(3)4)47(65)59-35(20)53(71)80-43(31(13)14)49(67)61-40(28(7)8)55(73)76-37/h25-45H,22-24H2,1-21H3,(H,58,64)(H,59,65)(H,60,66)(H,61,67)(H,62,68)(H,63,69)/t34-,35-,36-,37-,38-,39-,40+,41+,42+,43+,44+,45+/m1/s1 Key: JWWAHGUHYLWQCQ-UHZBFKKDBT
- SMILES: O=C1N[C@H](C(=O)O[C@@H](C(=O)N[C@@H](C(=O)O[C@H](C(=O)N[C@H](C(=O)O[C@@H](C(=O)N[C@@H](C(=O)O[C@H](C(=O)N[C@H](C(=O)O[C@@H](C(=O)N[C@@H](C(=O)O[C@H]1C(C)C)C)CC(C)C)C(C)C)C(C)C)C)CC(C)C)C(C)C)C(C)C)C)CC(C)C)C(C)C

Properties
Chemical formula	C_{57} H_{96} N_{6} O_{18} (D-Ala-L-O-Val-L-Val-D OLeu-)_{3}
Molar mass	1152
Solubility in water	extremely low

Hazards
- Occupational safety and health (OHS/OSH)
Main hazards	Neurotoxicant
- Except where otherwise noted, data are given for materials in their standard state (at 25 °C [77 °F], 100 kPa). (what is ?) Infobox references

Cereulide is a heat-stable toxin produced by some strains of Bacillus cereus, B. megaterium and related species. It is a potent cytotoxin that causes nausea and vomiting.

Cereulide acts as an ionophore with a high affinity for potassium cations. Exposure to cereulide causes loss of the membrane potential and uncoupling of oxidative phosphorylation in the mitochondria. The nausea and vomiting is believed to be caused by cereulide's binding and activation of 5-HT_{3} receptors, leading to increased afferent vagus nerve stimulation.

Cereulide is a cyclic dodecadepsipeptide resembling valinomycin; it contains three repeats of four amino acids: D-Oxy-Leu—D-Ala—L-Oxy-Val—L-Val. It is produced by a dedicated non-ribosomal peptide synthesis (NRPS) system in B. cereus.

The spores of cereulide-producing strains of B. cereus and related species are manyfold more heat resistant than spores of cereulide non-producers. The toxin has no loss of activity upon autoclaving, cooking, or baking.

== Biosynthesis ==
In Bacillus cereus, cereulide is biosynthesised by the non-ribosomal peptide synthetase of the heterodimer proteins CesA and CesB. In non-ribosomal peptide synthetase, individual amino acids are added, modified, and linked. Addition is facilitated by the adenylation (A) domain. Modification is accomplished by the ketoreductase (KR) and epimerization (E) domains. Finally, the growing peptides are linked by condensation domains. The transportation between domains is facilitated by a peptide carrier protein or thiolation (T) domain, which houses the growing peptide chain. Additionally, a thioesterase (TE) domain is used by the final module to cleave and cyclize the final peptide product.

The peptides produced from both CesA and CesB are linked with an ester rather than amide bond; given the cyclic structure of cereulide, this cyclic ester (or lactone) linkage makes cereulide a depsipeptide.

CesA is a 387 kDa heterodimer protein composed of CesA1 and CesA2 modules. CesA1 adds ketoisocaproic acid to the adenylation domain. The thiolation domain will then move the ketoisocaproic acid along the ketoreductase domain, which reduces ketoisocaproic acid into D-α-hydroxyisocaproic acid with the cofactor NADPH. In module CesA2, L-alanine is added to the adenylation domain. The condensation domain will facilitate a nucleophilic attack by the free amine on L-alanine onto the thioester of D-α-hydroxyisocaproic acid (D-HIC) on the CesA1 module. This event links the peptides and situates the growing peptide molecule on the thiolation domain of CesA2. Next, an epimerization domain changes the stereochemistry of L-alanine (L-Ala) into D-alanine (D-Ala).

CesB is a 305 kDa heterodimer protein composed of CesB1 and CesB2 modules. CesB1 behaves almost identically to CesA1, where ketoisocaproic acid was added and reduced; however, the substrate α-ketoisovaleric acid is reduced to L- α-hydroxyisovaleric acid (L-HIV). Additionally, a condensation domain at the end of CesA (beyond CesA2) facilitates the ester formation between L-HIV and the D-HIC-D-Ala peptide.

Next, CesB2 adds L-valine (L-Val) to the adenylation domain, and the condensation domain facilitates the nucleophilic attack of the amine on L-Val onto the D-HIC-D-Ala-L-HIV thioester, which creates a D-HIC-D-Ala-L-HIV-L-Val tetrapeptide on the thiolation domain of CesB2. Finally, the final thioesterase domain combines three units of the aforementioned tetrapeptide between the α-hydroxyl group of D-HIC and the thioester of a L-Val of another tetrapeptide. Ultimately, three esters are formed during this cyclization of 3 tetrapeptides. The resulting cyclic depsipeptide, which contains alternating units of esters and amides, is cereulide.

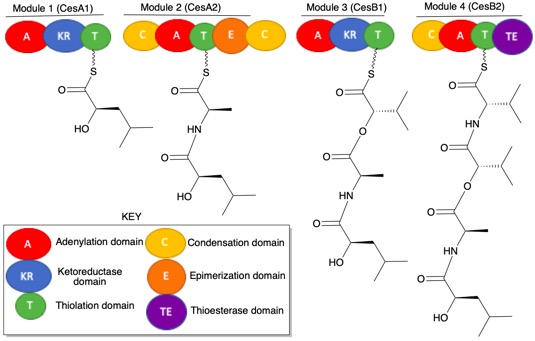
The following depicts the non-ribosomal peptide synthetase of the cereulide tetrapeptide. The growing and modified peptide can be seen on each Thiolation (T) domain. The new part of the molecule being inserted between the sulphur atom and the first carbonyl groep.

== In the news ==
On January 5th, 2026, Nestlé issued a global recall of some batches of infant formula, due to the presence of cereulide. The cereulide was found in a Nestlé production facility in Nunspeet the Netherlands. On January 24th 2026, Danone also recalled a single batch of infant formula. The contaminated ingredient was arachidonic acid oil.
