= Cytotoxin K =

Toxin excreted by Bacillus cereus

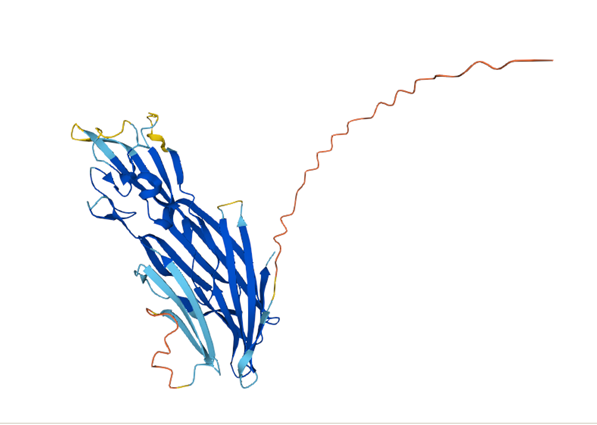
- The predicted structure of cytotoxin K

Identifiers
- Organism: Bacillus cereus
- Symbol: CytK
- Orthologs: OMA: entry
- UniProt: Q9EVA1
Search for
- Structures: Swiss-model
- Domains: InterPro

Cytotoxin-K (CytK) is a protein toxin produced by the gram-positive bacteria Bacillus cereus. It was first discovered in a certain Bacillus cereus strain which was isolated from a food poisoning epidemic that occurred in a French nursing home in 1998. There were six cases of bloody diarrhea, three of which were fatal. None of the known enterotoxins from B. cereus could be detected at this time. Later, this B. cereus strain and its relatives were classified as a brand-new species called Bacillus cytotoxicus, which is the thermo-tolerant member of the Bacillus genus. The cytotoxin-K gene is present in approximately 50% of Bacillus cereus isolates, and its expression is regulated by several factors, including temperature and nutrient availability.

Further studies showed that Cytotoxin-K is a pore-forming toxin that can create small holes in cell membranes, leading to cell death. It has been shown to cause damage to intestinal epithelial cells, indicating its potential role in the pathogenesis of Bacillus cereus infections in humans. The toxicity in humans has not been studied in detail but CC50 values of 500-1000nM dTHP-1 cells. In addition, CytK has been shown to have hemolytic activity, meaning it can damage red blood cells.

In addition to its role in Bacillus cereus pathogenesis, Cytotoxin-K has also been studied for its potential as a diagnostic tool for detecting Bacillus cereus contamination in food products. PCR methods have been analyzed that can detect the presence of CytK in food samples, showing CytK detection could be used for rapid and sensitive detection of potentially contaminated products.

Overall, the discovery and characterization of CytK have led to a greater understanding of the virulence factors of Bacillus cereus and have provided insights into potential targets for detecting, preventing and treating Bacillus cereus infections in humans.

== Available forms ==
The Cytotoxin-K gene encodes the Cytotoxin-K toxin. It was initially suggested during the early studies that cytK is not very common among various B. cereus isolates. Further research revealed two distinct cytK gene variants with substantial sequence homology; these were designated cytK-1 and cytK-2 in accordance with their discovery. Studies showed that 89% of the amino acids in the sequences of the related toxins CytK-1 and CytK-2 are identical.

The variations between the proteins CytK-1 and CytK-2 were centered in specific areas of the proteins. When CytK-1 was first analyzed, it was discovered that the toxin was very harmful to human intestinal epithelial cells and that it was hemolytic, dermo necrotic and that it was capable of creating pores in lipid layers. Although their toxicity was only around 20% that of CytK-1, the isolated CytK-2 proteins likewise demonstrated hemolysis and toxicity towards human intestinal Caco-2 cells and Vero cells. The B. cereus CytK-2 proteins, both native and recombinant, were capable of forming pores in planar lipid bilayers, although the majority of the channels they produced had lower conductance than those made by CytK-1. Although not all CytK-2 toxins may be as dangerous as the first discovered CytK-1, it is likely that CytK-2 toxins contribute to the enterotoxicity of some strains of B. cereus.

The production of Cytotoxin-K is important for the pathogenesis of Bacillus cereus, as it plays a role in the disruption of host cell membranes, allowing the bacterium to invade and colonize host tissues. Understanding the different forms of CytK is important for developing effective strategies to control the spread of Bacillus cereus and prevent foodborn illness.

== Structure ==
Cytotoxin K is a protein with a size of 34 kDa. The X-ray structure of this protein has not yet been determined but genetic analysis has elucidated some things about the structure. The CytK-2 gene is more studied but did not show any similarity with other genes which encode for enterotoxins produced by the bacteria B. cereus. It did show a similar sequence for a putative histidine kinase site and this can act as a recognition site for PlcR. PlcR does regulate the transcription of other known enterotoxins produced by this bacteria like HBL and Nhe which lead to believe that also CytK-2 does have a similar disease pattern like HBL and Nhe even if the sequence of the gene itself does not show this directly

The amino acid sequence of CytK-2 does actually show 30% similarity with α-hemolysin of S. aureus which lead to believe that CytK-2 falls in the same group of β-barrel channel-forming toxins which may explain the idea that CytK plays a role in a similar disease pattern as HBL and Nhe. The glycine-rich part of CytK, which aligns the most with the stem region of α-hemolysin (64%) and may adopt a similar structure.

This α-hemolysin of S. aureus synthesis which really does have much similarities with CytK-2 depends on different pairs of histidine kinases and response regulators, it is therefore tempting to suggest the possibility that a two-component system with a histidine kinase and a response regulator is also involved in regulation of the transcription of CytK, in addition to PlcR' at least on behalf of and on behalf of who showed this recognition site in the promotor region of CytK-2.

== Mechanism of toxicity ==
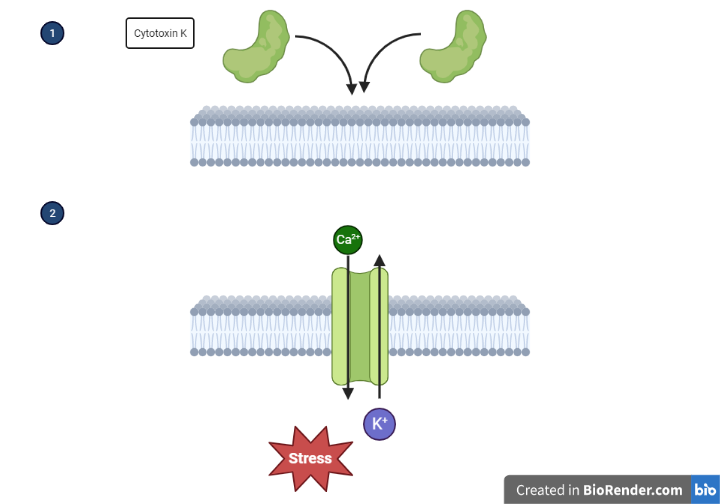
cytotoxin K forms pores in the outer membrane

Cytotoxin-K (CytK) is excreted via de Sec translocation pathway. and has shown to be hemolytic dermonecrotic and highly toxic towards human epithelial cells by inducing pyroptosis. Cytotoxin K induces this inflammatory cell death by interacting with phosphatidic acid (PA) and to a lesser extent PtdIns(4)P, PtdIns(4,5)P2, and PtdIns(3,4,5)P3 which are membrane lipids. By binding to the cellular membrane and oligomerization of cytotoxin K the protein forms pores that have a predicted opening size of 7 Armstrong. These pores cause changes the integrity of the membrane. As a result of this potassium ions efflux out of the cells while calcium ions accumulate disrupting the cellular homeostasis. The change in intercellular ion concentrations results in the activation of NLRP3. NLRP3 activation results in the formation of the inflammasome which in turn activates Gasdermin D and interleukin 1B. Gasdermin D then forms pores in the membrane and releases the interleukins and causes swelling and eventually bursting of the cell. The pore forming mechanisms of the two variants CytK1 and CytK2 haven't been fully investigated but are deducted from close protein families such as S. aureus α- and γ-hemolysin, C. perfringens β-toxin, and B. cereus hemolysin II which share significant homology. Thus, CytK is classified as member of the family of β-barrel pore-forming toxins

== Indications ==
CytK toxin is produced by certain strains of Bacillus cereus, a type of bacteria commonly found in soil, water, and food. Like other toxins produced by this bacteria, such as HBL and Nhe, consuming CytK toxin can cause diarrhea and other gastrointestinal symptoms (9).

If you suspect that you may have consumed CytK toxin, here are some indications to look out for:

- Diarrhea: This is one of the most common symptoms of CytK toxin poisoning. The diarrhea may be watery or bloody and can occur several times a day;
- Abdominal cramps: You may experience severe abdominal cramps or stomach pain;
- Nausea and vomiting: You may feel nauseous and may vomit;
- Fever: You may develop a fever along with other symptoms like a common cold;
- Dehydration: Diarrhea and vomiting can lead to dehydration. Signs of dehydration include dry mouth and throat, dark urine, and feeling lightheaded.

If you experience any of these symptoms after eating food contaminated with CytK toxin, seek medical attention immediately if after 24 hours the symptoms did not diminish, there are some cases of really worse seizures due to the intoxication (10). It's important to stay hydrated by drinking plenty of fluids, especially water or oral rehydration solutions, to replace lost fluids and electrolytes.
