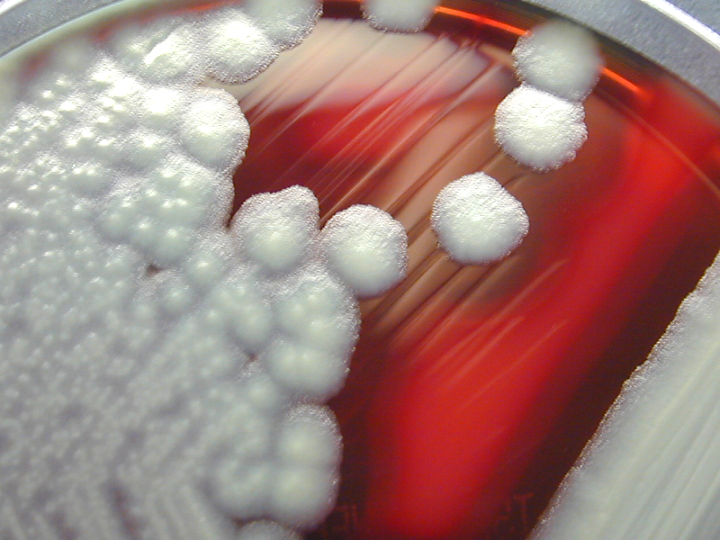
- B. cereus colonies on a sheep blood agar plate

Scientific classification
- Domain: Bacteria
- Kingdom: Bacillati
- Phylum: Bacillota
- Class: Bacilli
- Order: Caryophanales
- Family: Bacillaceae
- Genus: Bacillus
- Species: B. cereus

Binomial name
- Bacillus cereus Frankland & Frankland 1887

Biovars
- Bacillus cereus bv. anthracis

= Bacillus cereus =

Species of bacterium

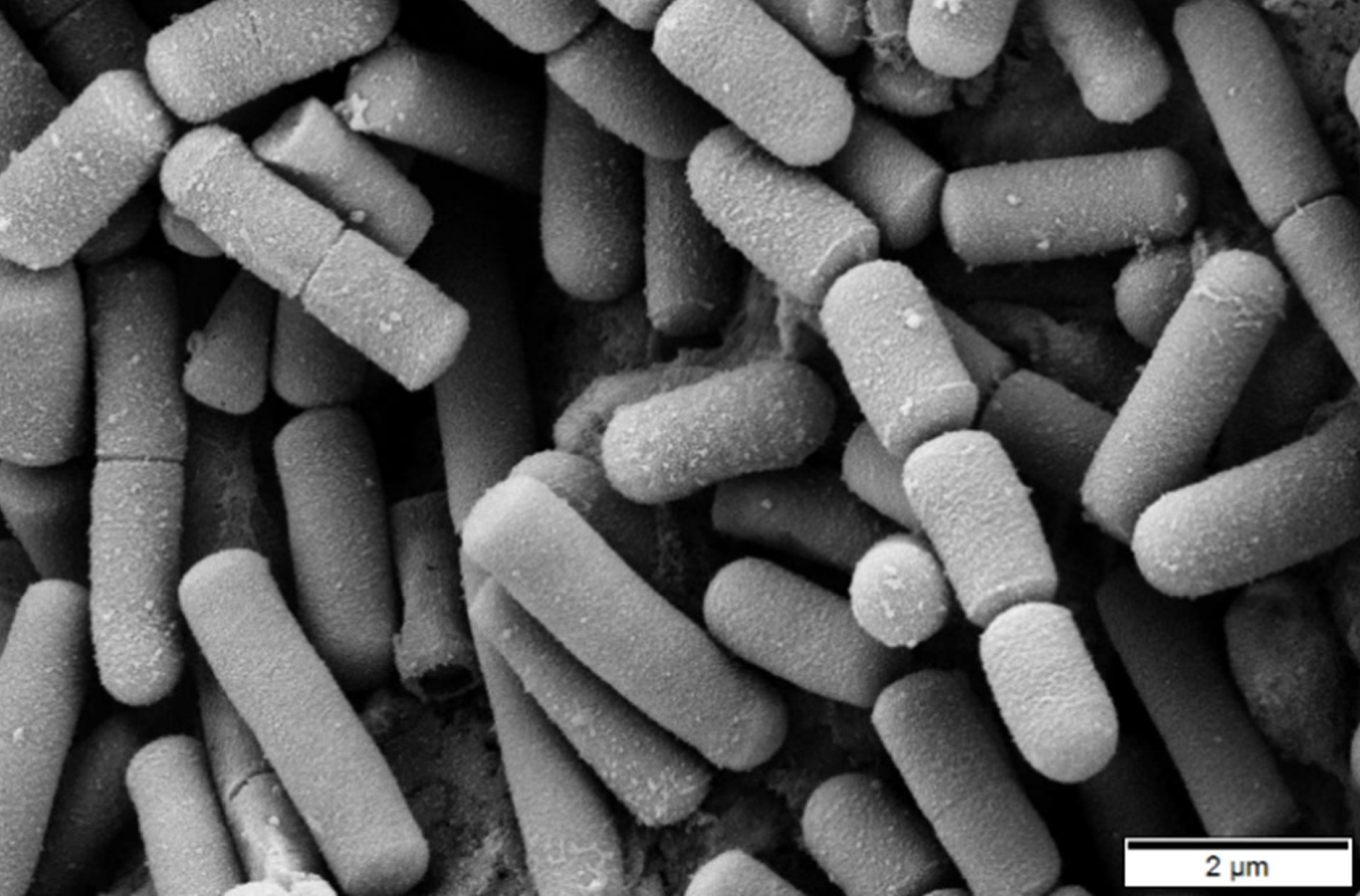
Electron micrograph of Bacillus cereus

Bacillus cereus is a Gram-positive rod-shaped bacterium commonly found in soil, food, and marine sponges. The specific name, cereus, meaning "waxy" in Latin, refers to the appearance of colonies grown on blood agar. Some strains are harmful to humans and cause foodborne illness due to their spore-forming nature, while other strains can be beneficial as probiotics for animals, and even exhibit mutualism with certain plants. B. cereus bacteria may be aerobes or facultative anaerobes, and like other members of the genus Bacillus, can produce protective endospores. They have a wide range of virulence factors, including phospholipase C, cereulide, sphingomyelinase, metalloproteases, and cytotoxin K, many of which are regulated via quorum sensing. B. cereus strains exhibit flagellar motility.

The Bacillus cereus group comprises seven closely related species: B. cereus sensu stricto (referred to herein as B. cereus), B. anthracis, B. thuringiensis, B. mycoides, B. pseudomycoides, and B. cytotoxicus; or as six species in a Bacillus cereus sensu lato: B. weihenstephanensis, B. mycoides, B. pseudomycoides, B. cereus, B. thuringiensis, and B. anthracis. A phylogenomic analysis combined with average nucleotide identity (ANI) analysis revealed that the B. anthracis species also includes strains annotated as B. cereus and B. thuringiensis.

== History ==
Colonies of B. cereus were originally isolated by Percy F. Frankland from a gelatine plate left exposed to the air in a cow shed in 1887. In the 2010s, examination of warning letters issued by the US Food and Drug Administration issued to pharmaceutical manufacturing facilities addressing facility microbial contamination revealed that the most common contaminant was B. cereus.

Several new enzymes have been discovered in B. cereus, such as AlkC and AlkD, both of which are involved in DNA repair.

== Microbiology ==
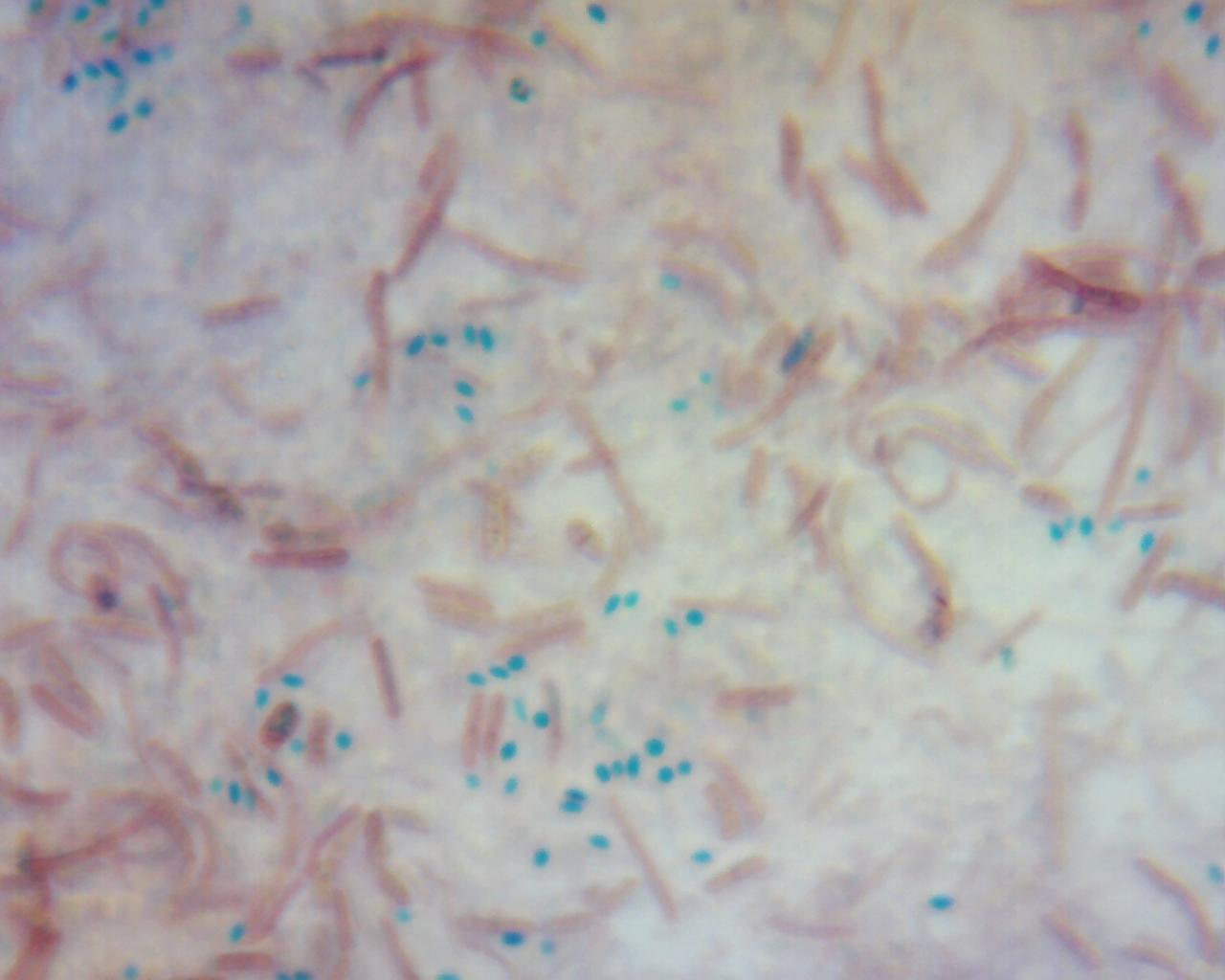
Bacillus cereus endospore stain

B. cereus is a rod-shaped bacterium with a Gram-positive cell envelope. Depending on the strain, it may be aerobic or facultatively anaerobic. Most strains are mesophilic, having an optimal temperature between 25 °C and 37 °C, and neutralophilic, preferring neutral pH, but some have been found to grow in environments with much more extreme conditions.

These bacteria are both spore-forming and biofilm-forming, presenting a large challenge to the food industry due to their contamination capability. Biofilms of B. cereus most commonly form on air-liquid interfaces or on hard surfaces such as glass. B. cereus display flagellar motility, which has been shown to aid in biofilm formation via an increased ability to reach surfaces suitable for biofilm formation, to spread the biofilm over a larger surface area, and to recruit planktonic, or single, free-living bacteria. Biofilm formation may also occur while in spore form due to varying adhesion ability of spores.

Their flagella are peritrichous, meaning there are many flagella located all around the cell body that can bundle together at a single location on the cell to propel it. This flagellar property also allows the cell to change directions of movement depending on where on the cell the flagellum filaments come together to generate movement.

Some studies and observations have shown that silica particles the size of a few nanometers have been deposited in a spore coat layer in the extracytoplasmic region of the Bacillus cereus spore. The layer was first discovered by the use of scanning transmission electron microscopy (STEM), however the images taken did not have resolution high enough to determine the precise location of the silica. Some investigators hypothesize that the layer helps different spores from sticking together. It has also been shown to provide some resistance to acidic environments. The silica coat is related to the permeability of the spore's inner membrane. Strong mineral acids are able to break down spore permeability barriers and kill the spore. However, when the spore has a silica coating, it may reduce the permeability of the membrane and provide resistance to many acids.

=== Metabolism ===
Bacillus cereus has mechanisms for both aerobic and anaerobic respiration, making it a facultative anaerobe. Its aerobic pathway consists of three terminal oxidases: cytochrome aa3, cytochrome caa3, and cytochrome bd, the use of each dependent on the amount of oxygen present in the environment. The B. cereus genome encodes genes for metabolic enzymes including NADH dehydrogenases, succinate dehydrogenase, complex III, and cytochrome c oxidase, as well as others. Bacillus cereus can metabolize several different compounds to create energy, including carbohydrates, proteins, peptides, and amino acids.

The Embden-Meyerhof pathway is the predominant pathway used by Bacillus cereus to catabolize glucose at every stage of the cell's development, according to estimates of a radiorespirometric method of glucose catabolism. This is true at times of germinative phases, as well as sporogenic phases. At the filamentous, granular, forespore, and transitional stages, the Embden-Meyerhof pathway was responsible for the catabolism of 98% of the cell's glucose. The remainder of the glucose was catabolized by the hexose monophosphate oxidative pathway.

Analysis of the core genome of B. cereus reveals a limited presence of enzymes meant for breakdown of polysaccharides and a prevalence of proteases and amino acid degradation and transport pathways, indicating that their preferred diet consists of proteins and their breakdown products.

An isolate of a bacterium found to produce PHBs was identified as B. cereus through analysis of 16S rRNA sequences as well as similarity of morphological and biochemical characteristics. PHBs may be produced when there is excess carbon or limited essential nutrients present in the environment, and they are later broken down by the microbe as a fuel source under starvation conditions. This indicates the potential role of B. cereus in producing biodegradable plastic substitutes. PHB production was highest when provided with glucose as a carbon source.

== Genomics ==
The genome of B. cereus has been characterized and shown to contain over 5 million bp of DNA. Out of these, more than 5500 protein-encoding genes have been identified, of which the top categories of genes with known functions include: metabolic processes, processing of proteins, virulence factors, response to stress, and defense mechanisms. Many of the genes categorized as virulence factors, stress responses, and defense mechanisms encode factors in antibiotic resistance. There are approximately 600 genes which are common in 99% of the taxa of B. cereus sensu lato, which constitutes around 1% of all genes in the pan-genome. Due to the prevalence of horizontal gene transfer among bacteria, the pan-genome of B. cereus is continually expanding. The GC content of its DNA across all strains is approximately 35%.

Following exposure to non-lethal acid shock at pH 5.4–5.5, the arginine deiminase gene in B. cereus, arcA, shows substantial up-regulation. This gene is part of the arcABC operon which is induced by low-pH environments in Listeria monocytogenes, and is associated with growth and survival in acidic environments. This suggests that this gene is also important for survival of B. cereus in acidic environments.

The activation of virulence factors has been shown to be transcriptionally regulated via quorum-sensing in B. cereus. The activation of many virulence factors secreted is dependent on the activity of the Phospholipase C regulator (PlcR), a transcriptional regulator which is most active at the beginning of the stationary phase of growth. A small peptide called PapR acts as the effector in the quorum-sensing pathway, and when reimported into the cell, it interacts with PlcR to activate transcription of these virulence genes. When point mutations were introduced into the plcR gene using the CRISPR/Cas9 system, it was observed that the mutated bacteria lost their hemolytic and phospholipase activity.

The flagella of B. cereus are encoded by 2 to 5 fla genes, depending on the strain.

== Identification ==
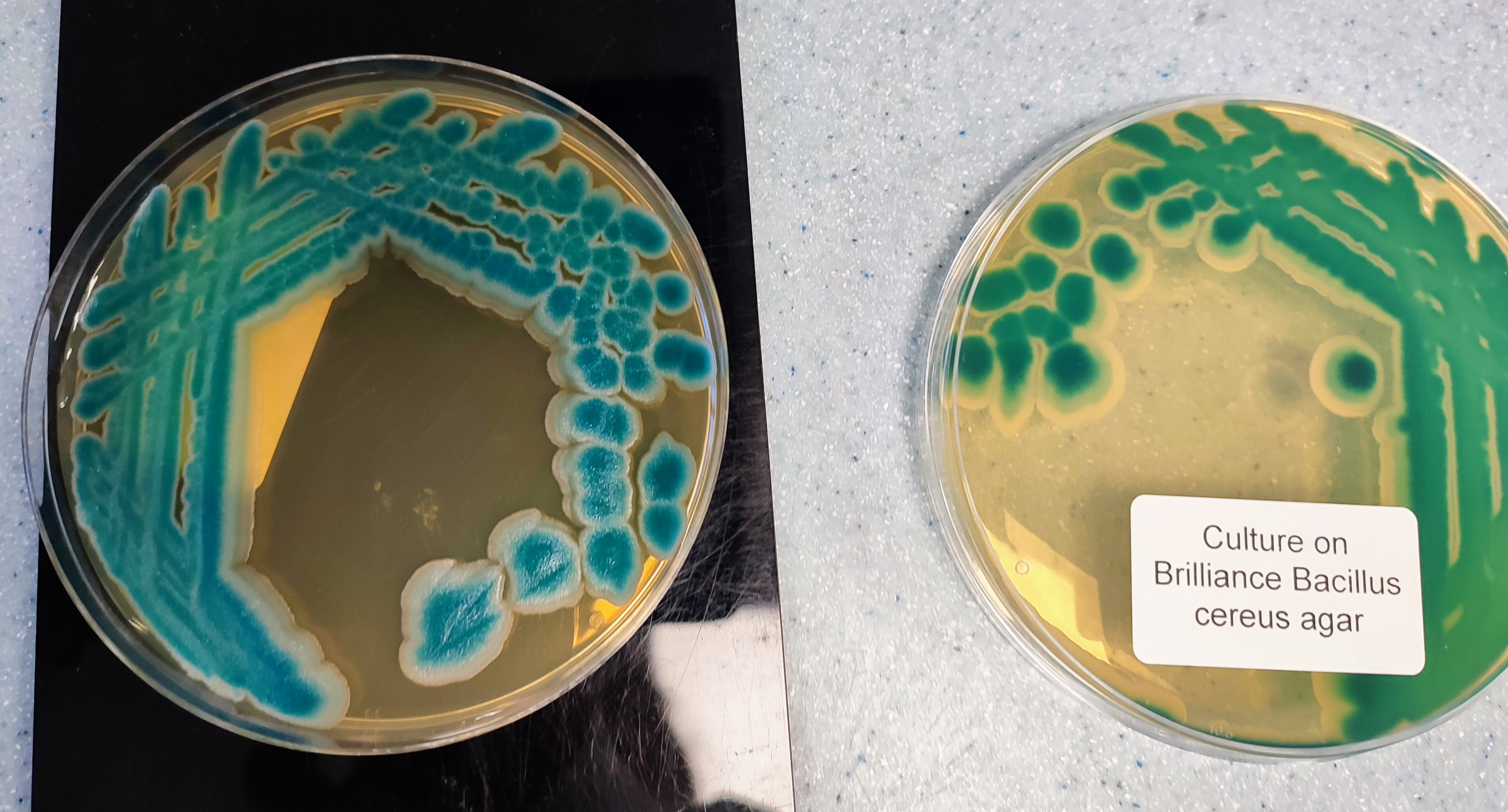
Bacillus cereus colonies on the indicator media Brilliance Bacillus cereus agar

For the isolation and enumeration of B. cereus, there are two standardized methods by International Organization for Standardization (ISO): ISO 7932 and ISO 21871. Because of B. cereus' ability to produce lecithinase and its inability to ferment mannitol, there are some proper selective media for its isolation and identification such as mannitol-egg yolk-polymyxin (MYP) and polymyxin-pyruvate-egg yolk-mannitol-bromothymol blue agar (PEMBA). B. cereus colonies on MYP have a violet-red background and are surrounded by a zone of egg-yolk precipitate.

Below is a list of differential techniques and results that can help to identify B. cereus from other bacteria and Bacillus species.

- Anaerobic growth: Positive
- Voges Proskauer test: Positive
- Acid produced from
  - D-glucose: Positive
  - L-arabinose: Negative
  - D-xylose: Negative
  - D-mannitol: Negative
- Starch hydrolysis: Positive
- Nitrate reduction: Positive
- Degradation of tyrosine: Positive
- Growth at
  - above 50 °C: Negative
- Use of citrate: Positive

The Central Public Health Laboratory in the United Kingdom tests for motility, hemolysis, rhizoid growth, susceptibility to γ-phage, and fermentation of ammonium salt-based glucose but no mannitol, arabinose, or xylose.

== Growth ==
The optimal growth temperature range for B. cereus is 30–40 °C (86–104 °F). At 30 °C , a population of B. cereus can double in as little as 20 minutes or as long as 3 hours, depending on the food product. Spores of B. cereus are not metabolically active, but can rapidly become active and begin replicating once they encounter adequate growth conditions.

Food	Minutes to double, 30 °C (86 °F)	Hours to multiply by 1,000,000
Milk	20–36	6.6 - 12
Cooked rice	26–31	8.6 - 10.3
Infant formula	56	18.6

== Ecology ==
Like most Bacilli, the most common ecosystem of Bacillus cereus is the soil. In concert with arbuscular mycorrhiza (and Rhizobium leguminosarum in clover), they can up-regulate plant growth in heavy metal soils by decreasing heavy metal concentrations via bioaccumulation and biotransformation in addition to increasing phosphorus, nitrogen, and potassium uptake in certain plants. B. cereus was also shown to aid in survival of earthworms in heavy metal soils resulting from the use of metal-based fungicides, showing increases in biomass, reproduction and reproductive viability, and a decrease in metal content of tissues in those inoculated with the bacterium. These results suggest strong possibilities for its application in ecological bioremediation. Evidence of bioremediation potential by Bacillus cereus was also found in the aquatic ecosystem, where organic nitrogen and phosphorus wastes polluting a eutrophic lake were broken down in the presence of B. cereus.

In a study measuring the ability of B. cereus to degrade keratin in chicken feathers, bacteria were found to sufficiently biodegrade keratin via hydrolytic mechanisms. These results indicate its potential to degrade keratinous waste from the poultry industry for potential recycling of the byproducts.

B. cereus competes with Gram-negative bacteria species such as Salmonella and Campylobacter in the gut; its presence reduces the number of Gram-negative bacteria, specifically via antibiotic activity via enzymes such as cereins that impede their quorum sensing ability and exhibit bactericidal activity. In food animals such as chickens, rabbits and pigs, some harmless strains of B. cereus are used as a probiotic feed additive to reduce Salmonella in the animals' intestines and cecum. This improves the animals' growth, as well as food safety for humans who eat them. In addition, B. cereus create and release enzymes that aid in the digestion of materials that are typically difficult to digest, such as woody plant matter, in the guts of other organisms.

The strain B. cereus B25 is a biofungicide. A study by Figueroa-López et al. showed that the presence of this strain reduced Fusarium verticillioides growth. B25 shows promise for reduction of mycotoxin concentrations in grains.

== Pathogenesis ==
B. cereus is responsible for a minority of foodborne illnesses (2–5%), causing severe nausea, vomiting, and diarrhea. Bacillus foodborne illnesses occur when B. cereus spores or bacteria contaminate food and are allowed to survive cooking, and then given sufficient time to germinate, multiply, and produce toxins in the food.

Normal cooking methods such as boiling, stewing, or steaming at 100 °C (212 °F) reliably kill Bacillus cereus vegetative cells, but do not reliably destroy heat-resistant spores. The risk is increased when cooked food is then slowly cooled or left within the temperature "danger zone", which is between 4 °C (39 °F) to 60 °C (140 °F), allowing spores to germinate. FDA's Food Code 2017 recommends that cooked food not meant for immediate consumption is cooled rapidly and refrigerated promptly at temperatures below 5 °C (41 °F), or is kept hot above 57 °C (135 °F). Refrigeration does not destroy bacteria but inhibits or slows their growth. Germination and growth generally occur between 10 °C and 50 °C, though some strains can grow at low temperatures, and Bacillus cytotoxicus strains have been shown to grow at temperatures up to 52 °C (126 °F). Bacterial growth results in production of enterotoxins, one of which is highly resistant to heat and acids (pH levels between 2 and 11); ingestion leads to two types of illness: diarrheal and emetic (vomiting) syndrome. The enterotoxins produced by B. cereus have beta-hemolytic activity.

- The diarrheal type is associated with a wide range of foods, has an 8-to-16-hour incubation time, and is associated with diarrhea and gastrointestinal pain. Also known as the 'long-incubation' form of B. cereus food poisoning, it might be difficult to differentiate from poisoning caused by Clostridium perfringens. Enterotoxin can be inactivated after heating at 56 °C (133 °F) for 5 minutes, but whether its presence in food causes the symptom is unclear, since it degrades in stomach enzymes; its subsequent production by surviving B. cereus spores within the small intestine may be the cause of illness.
- The 'emetic' form commonly results from rice which is cooked at a time and temperature insufficient to kill any spores present, then improperly refrigerated. The remaining spores can produce a toxin, cereulide, which is not inactivated by later reheating. This form leads to nausea and vomiting 1–5 hours after consumption. Distinguishing from other short-term bacterial foodborne intoxications, such as by Staphylococcus aureus, can be difficult. Emetic toxin can withstand 121 °C (250 °F) for 90 minutes. As a result of the emetic type's association with rice, it is sometimes referred to colloquially as fried rice syndrome.

The diarrhetic syndromes observed in patients are thought to stem from the three toxins: hemolysin BL (Hbl), nonhemolytic enterotoxin (Nhe), and cytotoxin K (CytK). The nhe/hbl/cytK genes are located on the chromosome of the bacteria. Transcription of these genes is controlled by PlcR. These genes occur in the taxonomically related B. thuringiensis and B. anthracis, as well. These enterotoxins are all produced in the small intestine of the host, thus thwarting digestion by host endogenous enzymes. The Hbl and Nhe toxins are pore-forming toxins closely related to ClyA of E. coli. The proteins exhibit a conformation known as a "beta-barrel" that can insert into cellular membranes due to a hydrophobic exterior, thus creating pores with hydrophilic interiors. The effect is loss of cellular membrane potential and eventually cell death.

Previously, it was thought that the timing of the toxin production was responsible for the two different courses of disease, but it has since been found that the emetic syndrome is caused by the toxin cereulide, which is found only in emetic strains and is not part of the "standard toolbox" of B. cereus. Cereulide is a cyclic polypeptide containing three repeats of four amino acids: D-oxy-Leu—D-Ala—L-oxy-Val—L-Val (similar to valinomycin produced by Streptomyces griseus) produced by nonribosomal peptide synthesis. Cereulide is believed to bind to 5-hydroxytryptamine 3 (5-HT3) serotonin receptors, activating them and leading to increased afferent vagus nerve stimulation. It was shown independently by two research groups to be encoded on multiple plasmids: pCERE01 or pBCE4810. Plasmid pBCE4810 shares homology with the B. anthracis virulence plasmid pXO1, which encodes the anthrax toxin. Periodontal isolates of B. cereus also possess distinct pXO1-like plasmids. Like most of cyclic peptides containing nonproteogenic amino acids, cereulide is resistant to heat, proteolysis, and acid conditions.

B. cereus is also known to cause difficult-to-eradicate chronic skin infections, though less aggressive than necrotizing fasciitis. B. cereus can also cause keratitis.

While often associated with gastrointestinal illness, B. cereus is also associated with illnesses such as fulminant bacterial infection, central nervous system involvement, respiratory tract infection, and endophthalmitis. Endophthalmitis is the most common form of extra-gastrointestinal pathogenesis, which is an infection of the eye that may cause permanent vision loss. Infections typically cause a corneal ring abscess, followed by other symptoms such as pain, proptosis, and retinal hemorrhage. While different from B. anthracis, B. cereus contains some toxin genes originally found in B. anthracis that are attributed to anthrax-like respiratory tract infections.

A case study was published in 2019 of a catheter-related bloodstream infection of B. cereus in a 91-year-old male previously being treated with hemodialysis via PermCath for end-stage renal disease. He presented with chills, tachypnea, and high-grade fever, his white blood cell count and high-sensitivity C-reactive protein (CRP) were significantly elevated, and CT imaging revealed a thoracic aortic aneurysm. He was successfully treated for the infection with intravenous vancomycin, oral fluoroquinolones, and PermCath removal. Another case study of B. cereus infection was published in 2021 of a 30-year-old woman with lupus who was diagnosed with infective endocarditis after receiving a catheter. The blood samples were positive for B. cereus and the patient was subsequently treated with vancomycin. PCR was also used to verify toxins that the isolate produces.

=== Diagnosis ===
In case of foodborne illness, the diagnosis of B. cereus can be confirmed by the isolation of more than 100,000 B. cereus organisms per gram from epidemiologically implicated food, but such testing is often not done because the illness is relatively harmless and usually self-limiting.

=== Prognosis ===
Most emetic patients recover within 6 to 24 hours, but in some cases, the toxin can be fatal via fulminant hepatic failure. In 2014, 23 newborns in the UK receiving total parenteral nutrition contaminated with B. cereus developed sepsis, with three of the infants later dying as a result of infection.

=== Prevention ===
While B. cereus vegetative cells are killed during normal cooking, spores are more resistant. Viable spores in food can become vegetative cells in the intestines and produce a range of diarrheal enterotoxins, so elimination of spores is desirable. In wet heat (poaching, simmering, boiling, braising, stewing, pot roasting, steaming), spores require more than 5 minutes at 121 °C (250 °F) at the coldest spot to be destroyed. In dry heat (grilling, broiling, baking, roasting, searing, sautéing), 120 °C (248 °F) for 1 hour kills all spores on the exposed surface. This process of eliminating spores is very important, as spores of B. cereus are particularly resistant, even after pasteurization or exposure to gamma rays.

B. cereus and other members of Bacillus are not easily killed by alcohol; they have been known to colonize distilled liquors and alcohol-soaked swabs and pads in numbers sufficient to cause infection.

A study of an isolate of Bacillus cereus that was isolated from the stomach of a sheep was shown to be able to break down β-cypermethrin (β-CY) which has been known to be an antimicrobial agent. This strain, known as GW-01, can break down β-CY at a significant rate when the bacterial cells are in high concentrations relative to the antimicrobial agent. It has also been noted that the ability to break down β-CY is inducible. However, as the concentration of β-CY increases, the rate of β-CY degradation decreases. This suggests that the agent also functions as a toxin against the GW-01 strain. This is significant as it shows that in the right concentrations, β-CY can be used as an antimicrobial agent against Bacillus cereus.

== Diseases in aquatic animals ==
Bacillus cereus group bacteria, notably B. cereus and B. thuringiensis, are also pathogenic to multiple aquatic organisms including Chinese softshell turtle (Pelodiscus sinensis), causing infection characterized by gross lesions such as hepatic congestion and enlarged spleen with high mortality.

== Bacteriophages ==
Bacteria of the B. cereus group are infected by bacteriophages belonging to the family Tectiviridae. This family includes tailless phages that have a lipid membrane or vesicle beneath the icosahedral protein shell and that are formed of approximately equal amounts of virus-encoded proteins and lipids derived from the host cell's plasma membrane. Upon infection, the lipid membrane becomes a tail-like structure used in genome delivery. The genome is composed of about 15-kilobase, linear, double-stranded DNA (dsDNA) with long, inverted terminal-repeat sequences (100 base pairs). GIL01, Bam35, GIL16, AP50, and Wip1 are examples of temperate tectiviruses infecting the B. cereus group. Bacteriophage PBC1 is an exampled of a tailed virus that infects B. cereus.

== See also ==
- Bacillus cereus biovar anthracis
