= United Kingdom and weapons of mass destruction =

United Kingdom of Great Britain and Northern Ireland
- Nuclear program start date: 10 April 1940
- First nuclear weapon test: 3 October 1952
- First thermonuclear weapon test: 15 May 1957
- Last nuclear test: 26 November 1991
- Largest yield test: 3 Mt (13 PJ) (28 April 1958)
- Total tests: 45 detonations
- Peak stockpile: 520 warheads (1970s)
- Current stockpile: 225 method of delivery (Trident II SLBM)
- Total deployed warhead megatonnage: based on a yield of 100kt per warhead.
- Maximum missile range: 13,000 km (7,000 nmi or 8,100 mi) (UGM-133 Trident II)
- NPT party: Yes (1968, one of five recognised powers)

The United Kingdom is one of the five official nuclear-weapon states under the Treaty on the Non-Proliferation of Nuclear Weapons. It formerly possessed biological, and chemical weapons.

As of 2025, the UK possesses a stockpile of approximately 225 warheads, with 120 deployed on its only delivery system, the Trident programme's submarine-launched ballistic missiles. Additionally, United States nuclear weapons are stored at RAF Lakenheath since 2025, as well as between 1954 and 2008.

The UK initiated the world's first nuclear weapons programme, Tube Alloys, in 1941 during the Second World War. Under the 1943 Quebec Agreement, it was merged with the US Manhattan Project, but collaboration ended in 1946. The UK initiated an independent programme, High Explosive Research, testing its first nuclear weapon in 1952. After the British hydrogen bomb programme's successful Operation Grapple tests, the US resumed nuclear cooperation with the 1958 Mutual Defence Agreement. This has involved the exchange of classified scientific data, warhead designs, and fissile materials. UK warheads are designed and manufactured by the Atomic Weapons Establishment.

In total the UK conducted 45 nuclear tests, 12 in Australia, 9 in the Pacific, and 24 at the Nevada Test Site, with its last in 1991. The UK and France are the only two nuclear-armed countries that have ratified the Comprehensive Nuclear-Test-Ban Treaty.

During the Cold War, the UK developed a wide range of nuclear weapons delivery systems, primarily its strategic V bomber fleet, and the tactical WE.177 bomb. With a US agreement, it operated the Polaris fleet of ballistic missile submarines from 1968, replaced by the Trident fleet beginning 1994. The US supplied warheads under Project E, as well as the PGM-17 Thor missile, and hosted US systems including the Ground-Launched Cruise Missile, submarines at Holy Loch, and Strategic Air Command bombers.

The UK used chemical weapons extensively during the First World War, primarily chlorine, phosgene, and mustard gas, and in its intervention in the Russian Civil War employed adamsite. It possessed and researched chemical and biological weapons during and after the Second World War, centered at Porton Down. The causative agents of anthrax, plague, and tularaemia, and others were tested. After the war, the UK experimented with nerve agents such as sarin. In 1956, the UK renounced chemical and biological weapons, and later acceded to the Biological Weapons Convention and Chemical Weapons Convention. It completed destruction of its chemical stockpile in 2007.

== Biological weapons ==
During the Second World War, British scientists studied the use of biological weapons, including a test using anthrax on the Scottish island of Gruinard which left it contaminated and fenced off for nearly fifty years until an intensive four-year program to eradicate the spores was completed in 1990. They also manufactured five million linseed-oil cattle cakes with a hole bored into them for addition of anthrax spores between 1942 and mid-1943. These were to be dropped on Germany using specially designed containers each holding 400 cakes, in a project known as Operation Vegetarian. It was intended that the disease would destroy the German beef and dairy herds and possibly spread to the human population. Preparations were not complete until early 1944. Operation Vegetarian was only to be used in the event of a German anthrax attack on the United Kingdom.

Offensive weapons development continued after the war into the 1950s with tests of plague, brucellosis, tularemia and later equine encephalomyelitis and vaccinia viruses (the latter as a relatively safe simulant for smallpox).

In particular, five sets of trials took place at sea using aerosol clouds and animals.

- Operation Harness off Antigua in 1948–1949.
- Operation Cauldron off Stornoway in 1952. The trawler Carella unknowingly sailed through a cloud of pneumonic plague bacilli (Yersinia pestis) during this trial. It was kept under covert observation until the incubation period had elapsed but none of the crew fell ill.
- Operation Hesperus off Stornoway in 1953.
- Operation Ozone off Nassau in 1954.
- Operation Negation off Nassau in 1954–1955.

The program was canceled in 1956 when the British government renounced the use of biological and chemical weapons. In 1974, biological weapons were banned, and the United Kingdom ratified the Biological and Toxin Weapons Convention in March 1975.

== Chemical weapons ==
The UK was a signatory of the Hague Conventions (1899 and 1907) which outlawed the use of poison gas in warfare. However, during the First World War, in retaliation to the use of chlorine by Germany against British troops from April 1915 onwards, British forces deployed chlorine themselves for the first time during the Battle of Loos on 25 September 1915. By the end of the war, poison gas use had become widespread on both sides and by 1918 a quarter of artillery shells were filled with gas and Britain had produced around 25,400 tons of toxic chemicals.

As part of widespread chemical warfare in World War I, Britain used a range of poison gases, originally chlorine and later phosgene, diphosgene and mustard gas. They also used relatively small amounts of the irritant gases chloromethyl chloroformate, chloropicrin, bromacetone and ethyl iodoacetate. Gases were frequently mixed, for example white star was the name given to a mixture of equal volumes of chlorine and phosgene, the chlorine helping to spread the denser but more toxic phosgene. Despite the technical developments, chemical weapons suffered from diminishing effectiveness as the war progressed because of the protective equipment and training which the use engendered on both sides.

After the war, British forces reportedly used adamsite against Bolshevik troops in 1919, and Winston Churchill, secretary of state for war and air, suggested that the RAF use it in Iraq in 1920 during a major revolt there. Historians are divided as to whether or not gas was in fact used.

The UK ratified the Geneva Protocol on 9 April 1930. The UK signed the Chemical Weapons Convention on 13 January 1993 and ratified it on 13 May 1996.

Despite the signing of the Geneva Protocol, the UK carried out extensive testing of chemical weapons from the early 1930s onwards. In the Rawalpindi experiments, hundreds of Indian soldiers were exposed to mustard gas in an attempt to determine the appropriate dosage to use on battlefields. Many of the subjects suffered severe burns from their exposure to the gas.

Many ex-servicemen have complained about suffering long-term illnesses after taking part in tests on nerve agents. It was alleged that before volunteering they were not provided with adequate information about the experiments and the risk, in breach of the Nuremberg Code of 1947. Alleged abuses at Porton Down became the subject of a lengthy police investigation called Operation Antler, which covered the use of volunteers in testing a variety of chemical weapons and countermeasures from 1939 until 1989. An inquest was opened on 5 May 2004 into the death on 6 May 1953 of a serviceman, Ronald Maddison, during an experiment using sarin. His death had earlier been found by a private MoD inquest to have been as a result of "misadventure" but this was quashed by the High Court in 2002. The 2004 hearing closed on 15 November, after a jury found that the cause of Maddison's death was "application of a nerve agent in a non-therapeutic experiment".

== Nuclear weapons ==
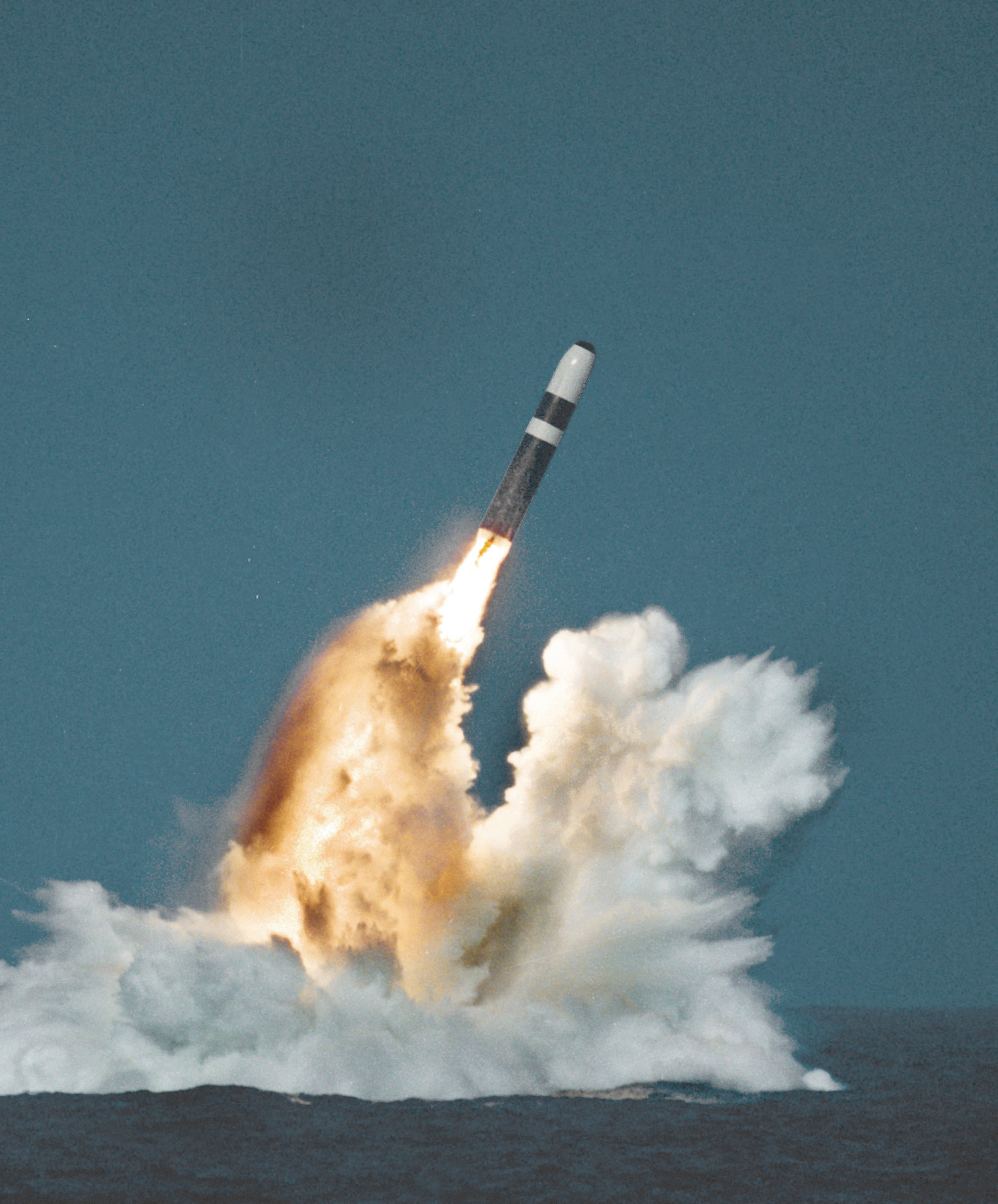
A Trident missile launched from a submerged ballistic missile submarine.

British nuclear weapons are designed and developed by the UK's Atomic Weapons Establishment. The United Kingdom has four Vanguard-class submarines armed with nuclear armed Trident missiles. The principle of operation is based on maintaining deterrent effect by always having at least one submarine at sea, and was designed during the Cold War period. One submarine is normally undergoing maintenance and the remaining two are in port or on training exercises.

Each submarine carries up to sixteen Trident II D-5 missiles, which can each carry up to twelve warheads, for a maximum of 192 warheads per vessel. However, the British government announced in 1998 that each submarine would carry only 48 warheads (halving the limit specified by the previous government), which is an average of three per missile. However one or two missiles per submarine are probably armed with fewer warheads for "sub-strategic" use causing others to be armed with more.

The British-designed warheads are thought to be selectable between 0.3 kilotons, 5–10 kt and 100 kt; the yields obtained using either the unboosted primary, the boosted primary, or the entire "physics package". The United Kingdom has purchased the rights to 58 missiles under the Polaris Sales Agreement (modified for Trident) from the United States Navy's "pool". These missiles are fitted with United Kingdom–built warheads and are exchanged when requiring maintenance. Under the agreement the United States was given certain assurances by the UK regarding the use of the missiles; however the United States does not have any veto on the use of British nuclear weapons. Some non-nuclear components for the British nuclear warhead are procured from the U.S. for reasons of cost effectiveness.

The United Kingdom is one of the five "Nuclear Weapons States" (NWS) under the Nuclear Non-Proliferation Treaty, which the UK ratified in 1968.

The UK permits the U.S. to deploy nuclear weapons from its territory, the first having arrived in 1954. During the 1980s nuclear armed USAF Ground Launched Cruise Missiles were deployed at RAF Greenham Common and RAF Molesworth. As of 2005 it is believed that about 110 tactical B61 nuclear bombs are stored at RAF Lakenheath for deployment by USAF F-15E aircraft.

In March 2007, the UK Parliament voted to renew the country's Trident nuclear submarine system at a cost of £20 billion. In July 2008, The Guardian claimed that the decision had already been made to replace and upgrade Britain's nuclear warhead stockpile at a cost of £3 billion, extending the life of the warheads until 2055.

On 25 February 2020, the UK released a Written Statement outlining that the current UK nuclear warheads will be replaced and will match the US Trident SLBM and related systems.

In March 2021, the British government published the Integrated Review, titled Global Britain in a Competitive Age, which reaffirmed the government's commitment to upgrading and maintaining Trident as a continuous at-sea deterrent. The review also announced that the cap for the UK's stockpile of nuclear warheads would rise from 180 to 260 — the first time it has risen since the Cold War — due to the "evolving security environment".

In June 2025, the UK announced plans to purchase 12 F35-A aircraft, that will carry both conventional and nuclear weapons, including the B61-12 gravity bomb. The aircraft will be based at RAF Marham in Norfolk as part of NATO's dual capable aircraft programme.

== See also ==
- British Armed Forces
