= Chemical weapons and the United Kingdom =

History of UK chemical weapons usage

Chemical weapons were widely used by the United Kingdom in World War I. The use of poison gas was suggested by Winston Churchill and others in Mesopotamia during the interwar period, and also considered in World War II, although it appears that they were not actually used in these conflicts. While the UK was a signatory of the Hague Conventions of 1899 and 1907 which outlawed the use of poison gas shells, the conventions omitted mention of deployment from cylinders.

The United Kingdom ratified the Geneva Protocol on 9 April 1930. The UK signed the Chemical Weapons Convention on 13 January 1993 and ratified it on 13 May 1996.

== Use in World War I ==
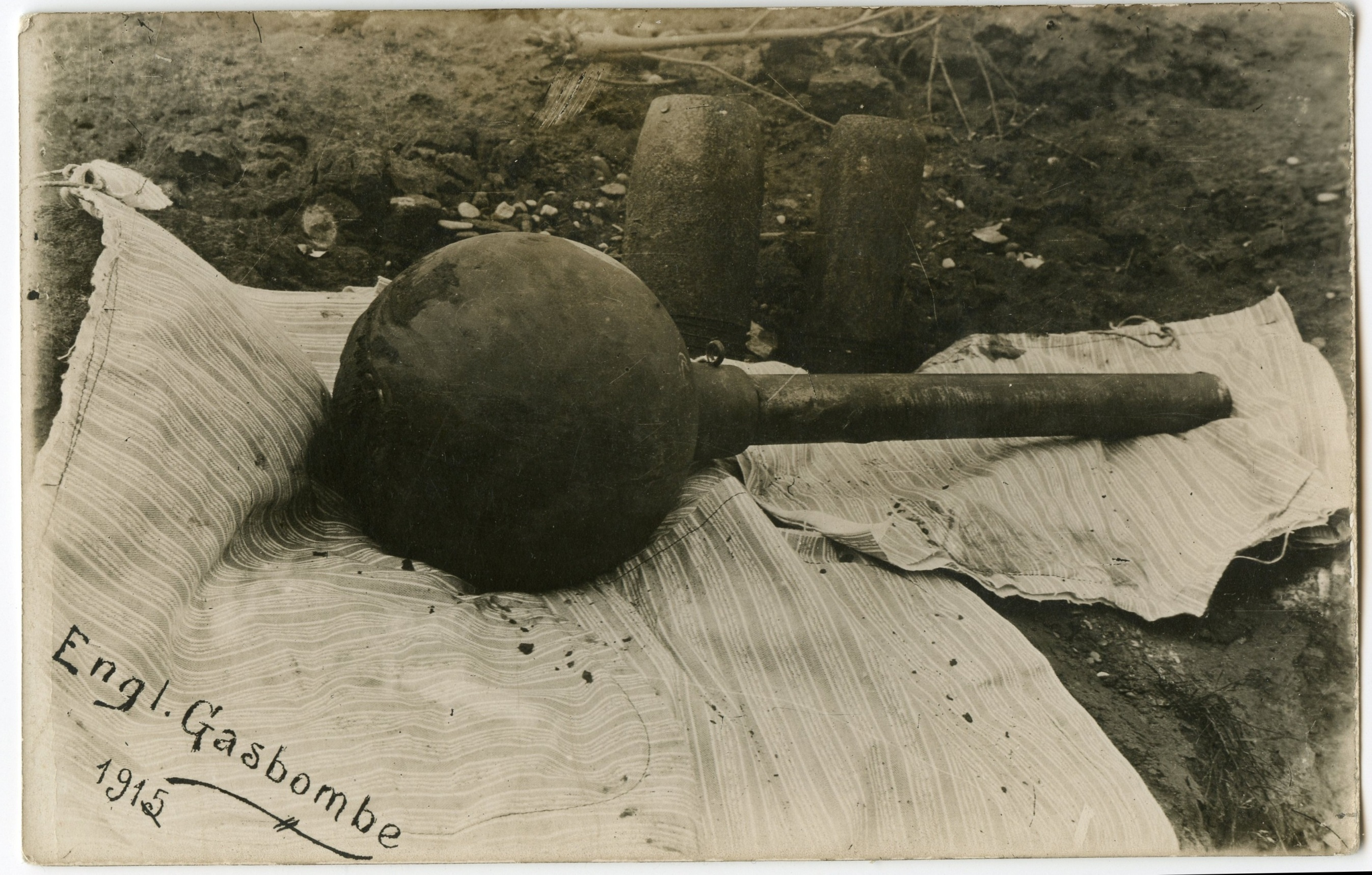
A World War I-era British gas bomb

During the First World War, in retaliation for the use of chlorine gas by Germany against British troops from April 1915 onwards, the British Army deployed chlorine themselves for the first time during the Battle of Loos on 25 September 1915. By the end of the war, poison-gas use had become widespread on both sides. By 1918, a quarter of artillery shells were filled with gas and Britain had produced around 25,400 tons of toxic chemicals.

Britain used a range of poison gases, initially chlorine and later phosgene, diphosgene and mustard gas. British forces also used relatively small amounts of the irritant gases chloromethyl chloroformate, chloropicrin, bromacetone and ethyl iodoacetate. Gases were frequently mixed. For example, white star was the name given to a mixture of equal volumes of chlorine and phosgene, the chlorine helping to spread the denser but more toxic phosgene. Despite the rapid technical developments that occurred in the production of specialised agents, chemical weapons suffered from diminishing effectiveness as the war progressed because of the corresponding sophistication of the protective equipment and training adopted by both sides.

Mustard gas was first used effectively in World War I by the Imperial German Army against Commonwealth soldiers in the Battle of Passchendaele near Ypres, Belgium, in 1917 and later also against the French Second Army. The name Yperite comes from its usage by the German army near the town of Ypres. The Allies did not use mustard gas until November 1917 at the Battle of Cambrai after their armies had captured a stockpile of German mustard-gas shells. It took the British more than a year to develop their own mustard-gas agent, with production of the chemicals taking place at Avonmouth Docks. (The only option available to the British was the Despretz–Niemann–Guthrie process). This was first used in September 1918 in the course of breaking of the Hindenburg Line during the Hundred Days' Offensive.

The use of chemical weapons during the Great War was in violation of the 1899 Hague Declaration Concerning Asphyxiating Gases and the 1907 Hague Convention on Land Warfare, which explicitly forbade the employment of "poison or poisoned weapons" in warfare.

== Between the wars ==
To maintain a stockpile of Adamsite, the British Ministry of Munitions established at Sutton Oak the Chemical Defence Research Establishment (CDRE) in 1919. The plant was able to manufacture up to 20 tons of mustard gas per week in the late 1920s.

After the war, the Royal Air Force dropped diphenylchloroarsine, an irritant agent designed to cause uncontrollable coughing, on Bolshevik troops in 1919. Winston Churchill, secretary of state for war and air, suggested that the RAF use poison gas in Iraq in 1920 during a major revolt there. In the early 2000s, historians were divided as to whether or not gas was actually used in Iraq. A 2009 review of surviving documentary evidence by historian R. M. Douglas in the Journal of Modern History concluded that "while at various moments tear gas munitions were available in Mesopotamia, circumstances seeming to call for their use existed, and official sanction to employ them had been received, at no time during the period of the mandate did all three of these conditions apply" and that it was clear that no poison gas was used. Douglas said that interdepartmental miscommunication within the contemporary British administration, including a secretarial letter erroneously stating gas had been used which was later withdrawn and corrected, was responsible for later academic confusion.

It is sheer affectation to lacerate a man with the poisonous fragment of a bursting shell and to boggle at making his eyes water by means of lachrymatory gas. I am strongly in favour of using poisoned gas against uncivilised tribes. The moral effect should be so good that the loss of life should be reduced to a minimum. It is not necessary to use only the most deadly gasses: gasses can be used which cause great inconvenience and would spread a lively terror and yet would leave no serious permanent effects on most of those affected.

— Winston Churchill, Departmental minute (1919)

In 1937, the British conglomerate Imperial Chemical Industries (ICI) began to build a new factory for the production of mustard gas at their Randle plant on Wigg Island, Runcorn, Cheshire.

Britain signed and ratified the Geneva Gas Protocol in 1930, which banned the use of toxic gases and bacteria in war but not the development and production of such weapons. Britain carried out extensive testing of chemical weapons from the early 1930s onwards. In the Rawalpindi experiments, hundreds of Indian soldiers were exposed to mustard gas in an attempt to determine the appropriate concentrations to use on battlefields. Many of the subjects suffered severe burns from their exposure to the gas.

== Proposed use in World War II ==
In the late 1930s the Chamberlain government planned that the United Kingdom should be in a position at the beginning of any war to retaliate in kind if the Germans, as expected, used mustard gas and phosgene to help repel a German invasion in 1940–1941,. If an invasion had occurred, the Royal Air Force may have also deployed it against German cities. General Brooke, in command of British anti-invasion preparations of World War II said that in the event of a German landing, he "had every intention of using sprayed mustard gas on the beaches" in an annotation in his diary. The British manufactured mustard, chlorine, lewisite, phosgene and Paris Green and stored them at airfields and depots for use on the invasion beaches.

=== M. S. Factory, Valley ===
In April/June 1939 the Alyn Valley in Rhydymwyn was surveyed by the Department of Industrial Planning on behalf of the Ministry of Supply and ICI, which was tasked with managing this programme. This resulted in M. S. Factory, Valley being established as the United Kingdom's main chemical-weapons plant.

=== Forward Filling Depots ===
To enable Britain to retaliate quickly if Nazi Germany used chemical weapons, a number of Forward Filling Depots were built so that the mustard-gas stockpile should be dispersed and ready to use.

- FFD 1 RAF Barnham, Little Heath, Suffolk. Under the control of 94 Maintenance Unit
- FFD 2 RAF Risely Lake Site, Bedfordshire. American FFD - Station 572
- FFD 3 RAF Station Swinderby, Lincolnshire. Under the control of 93 Maintenance Unit
- FFD 4 Bridge Site, Cambridgeshire. Under the control of 95 Maintenance Unit
- FFD 5 Station Site. West Cottingwith/Escrick, Yorkshire. Under the control of 80 Sub Maintenance Unit

=== Later plans ===
Winston Churchill issued a memorandum advocating a chemical strike on German cities using poison gas and possibly anthrax. Although the idea was rejected, it provoked debate. In July 1944, fearing that rocket attacks on London would get even worse and that he would only use chemical weapons if it was "life or death for us" or would "shorten the war by a year", Churchill wrote a secret memorandum asking his military chiefs to "think very seriously over this question of using poison gas." He said: "it is absurd to consider morality on this topic when everybody used it in the last war without a word of complaint," and that:

I should be prepared to do anything [Churchill's emphasis] that would hit the enemy in a murderous place. I may certainly have to ask you to support me in using poison gas. We could drench the cities of the Ruhr and many other cities in Germany ... We could stop all work at the flying bombs starting points....and if we do it, let us do it one hundred per cent.

— Winston Churchill, 'Most Secret' PRIME MINISTER'S PERSONAL MINUTE to the Chiefs of Staff, 6 July 1944

The Joint Planning Staff (JPS), however, advised against the use of gas because it would inevitably provoke Germany to retaliate in kind. They argued that this would be to the Allies' disadvantage in France both for military reasons and because it might "seriously impair our relations with the civilian population when it became generally known that chemical warfare was first employed by us." The JPS had similar concerns about public morale in Britain, fearing that people might become resentful if they felt a gas war could have been avoided. The Chiefs of Staff also warned that the Nazis would have no particular "difficulty in holding down the cowed German population, if they were subjected to gas attack," whereas the British population "are in no such inarticulate condition." Moreover, the German might use Allied prisoners as workers in contaminated areas causing "great public concern".

Churchill responded to this advice by saying:

I am not at all convinced by this negative report. But clearly I cannot make head against the parsons and the warriors at the same time. The matter should be kept under review and brought up again when things get worse.

At the same time, the JPS examined the arguments in favour of using anthrax bioweapons against six large German cities but ruled this out on the ground that the anthrax bombs were not yet available. A large batch of aerial bombs were ordered, but by the time the U.S. factory was ready to produce them, they were deemed unnecessary since the war in Europe was almost over.

Novelist Robert Harris and broadcaster Jeremy Paxman argue that as soon as another weapon of mass destruction – the atomic bomb – became available, and offered a chance to shorten the war, the Americans used it. "Why, from an ethical or political point of view, should germ warfare have been regarded any differently? [by British]."

As the end of the war was sufficiently in sight, British poison gas production was terminated following a request from the Chiefs of Staff Committee in February 1945.

=== Production in South Africa ===
Poison gas was produced in the Union of South Africa for the United Kingdom during the Second World War.

In 1943, the British Ministry of Aircraft Production opened discussions with the South African government, and then with the colonial administration of Bechuanaland (now Botswana), in an attempt to find a suitable site to test the weapons under the codename FORENSIC. South Africa indicated a suitable site would not be available; the British government then suggested a possible site in the Makgadikgadi Pan of Bechuanaland. The planned experiments were postponed with the onset of the 1943 rainy season and do not appear to have been carried out. Information about them was not publicly known until the opening of British colonial archives in 2012.

== After the Second World War ==
From 1939 to 1989 experiments on chemical weapons including nerve agents and countermeasures were carried out at the Porton Down research establishment. Although volunteers were used, many ex-servicemen complained of suffering long-term illnesses after taking part in the tests. It was alleged that before volunteering they were not provided with adequate information about the experiments and the risk they incurred by participating in them, in breach of the Nuremberg Code of 1947. This became the subject of a lengthy police investigation called Operation Antler.

From 1950, a Chemical Defence Establishment was established as CDE Nancekuke for small-scale chemical-agent production. A pilot production facility for Sarin was built, which produced about 20 tons of the nerve agent between 1954 and 1956. A full-scale production plant was planned, but with the 1956 decision to end the United Kingdom's offensive chemical-weapons programme it was never built. Nancekuke was mothballed, but was maintained through the 1960s and 1970s in a state whereby production of chemical weapons could easily re-commence if required.

In the early 1980s the government took the view that the lack of a European chemical-weapons retaliatory capability was a "major gap in NATO's armoury". However, the political difficulties of addressing this prevented any redevelopment of a British chemical weapons production facility.

An inquest was opened on 5 May 2004 into the death on 6 May 1953 of a serviceman, Ronald Maddison, during an experiment using sarin. His death had earlier been found by a private Ministry of Defence inquest to have been as a result of "misadventure" but this was quashed by the High Court in 2002. The 2004 hearing closed on 15 November, after a jury found that the cause of Maddison's death was "application of a nerve agent in a non-therapeutic experiment".

== See also ==
- Operation Vegetarian
- Alleged British use of chemical weapons in Mesopotamia in 1920
