= List of bioterrorist incidents =

This is a list of bioterrorist incidents.

== Guidelines ==
The definitions of bioterrorism for the purpose of this article are:

- The use of violence or of the threat of violence in the pursuit of political, religious, ideological or social objectives
- Acts committed by non-state actors (or by undercover personnel serving on the behalf of their respective governments)
- Acts reaching more than the immediate target victims and also directed at targets consisting of a larger spectrum of society
- Both mala prohibita (i.e., crime that is made illegal by legislation) and mala in se (i.e., crime that is inherently immoral or wrong)
- Committed with the use of biological agents

The following criteria of violence or threat of violence fall outside of the definition of this article:

- Wartime (including a declared war) or peacetime acts of violence committed by a nation state against another nation state regardless of legality or illegality and are carried out by properly uniformed forces or legal combatants of such nation states (See biological warfare)
- Reasonable acts of self-defense, such as the use of force to kill, apprehend, or punish criminals who pose a threat to the lives of humans or property
- Legitimate targets in war, such as enemy combatants and strategic infrastructure that form an integral part of the enemy's war effort such as defense industries and ports
- Collateral damage, including the infliction of incidental damage to non-combatant targets during an attack on or attempting to attack legitimate targets in war
- Targeted murders or poisonings carried out with the use of biological agents, not for political or religious purposes
- Plans that were not carried out

== List ==
Date	Incident	Agent	Dead	Injured	Location	Details	Perpetrator	References
1941-1945		Unknown	200	Unknown	Poland	Unconfirmed reports indicated that the Polish resistance killed 200 German soldiers with biological agents such as “typhoid fever microbes and typhoid fever lice” and letters contaminated with anthrax.	Polish resistance	
1952		Euphorbia grantii toxin	Unknown	Unknown	British Kenya	During the Mau Mau Uprising, the plant toxin of the African milk bush was used to poison livestock by the Mau Mau.	Mau Mau	
October, 1981	Operation Dark Harvest	Bacillus anthracis	Unknown	Unknown	Porton Down, United Kingdom	Dark Harvest Commando, a militant group, demanded the British government decontaminate Gruinard Island, a site which had been used for anthrax weapon testing during World War II, by distributing potentially anthrax-laden soil on the mainland.	Dark Harvest Commando	
August 29–October 10, 1984	1984 Rajneeshee bioterror attack	Salmonella	0	751	The Dalles, United States	The Rajneeshee cult spread salmonella in salad bars at ten restaurants in The Dalles, Oregon to influence a local election. Health officials say that 751 people were sickened and more than 40 hospitalized.	Rajneeshee	
July–December, 1989	1989 California medfly attack	Ceratitis capitata (Medfly)	0	0	Southern California, United States	During the summer and fall of 1989, several outbreaks of medflies occurred throughout Southern California, particularly in the Los Angeles metropolitan area. The outbreaks devastated crops.	"The Breeders" (Unresolved)	
April 1990		Botulinum toxin	0	0	Japan	The religious group Aum Shinrikyo outfitted three vehicles to disseminate botulinum toxin at the National Diet Building, Yokosuka naval base and the Narita International Airport	Aum Shinrikyo	
June 28–July 2, 1993	Kameido Odor Incident	Bacillus anthracis	0	0	Kameido, Tokyo, Japan	The religious group Aum Shinrikyo released anthrax in Tokyo. Eyewitnesses reported a foul odor. The attack was a failure, due to the fact that the group used the vaccine strain of the bacterium, and no one was infected.	Aum Shinrikyo	
September 18–October 12, 2001	2001 anthrax attacks	Bacillus anthracis	5	17	United States	Letters laced with infectious anthrax were concurrently delivered to news media offices and the U.S Congress, alongside an ambiguously related case in Chile. The letters killed 5.	Bruce Edwards Ivins	
2003	2003 ricin letters	Ricin	0	0	United States	Two ricin-laden letters were found on two separate occasions between October and November 2003. One letter was mailed to the White House and intercepted at a processing facility; another was discovered with no address in South Carolina. A February 2004 ricin incident at the Dirksen Senate Office Building was initially connected to the 2003 letters as well.	"Fallen Angel" (Unresolved)	
15–17 April 2013	April 2013 ricin letters	Ricin	0	0	Washington, D.C., United States	An envelope that preliminarily tested positive for ricin was intercepted at the US Capitol's off-site mail facility in Washington, D.C. According to reports, the envelope was addressed to the office of Mississippi Republican Senator Roger Wicker.	James Everett Dutschke	
