= Clifford Earl =

British actor (1933–2015)

- In The Avengers: Escape in Time (1967)
- Born: Kenneth Clifford Earl; 29 August 1933; Romney Marsh, Kent, England, UK
- Died: 30 July 2015 (aged 81); Aylesford, Kent, England, UK
- Occupation: Actor

Kenneth Clifford Earl (29 August 1933 – 30 July 2015) was an English actor who appeared in numerous television programmes and films.

== Early years ==
Earl was born in Romney Marsh, Kent, England.

He carried out his National Service in a medical role. After leaving the military he embarked on an acting career, often playing policemen and soldiers.

== Acting career ==
Earl appeared in the TV series Doctor Who twice: as the Station Sergeant in The Daleks' Master Plan in 1965, and as Major Branwell in The Invasion in 1968.

He also appeared in the films The Haunted House of Horror (1969), Scream and Scream Again (1970) and The Sea Wolves (1980).

== Personal life ==
In 1953, aged 19, Earl was among the servicemen who volunteered to take part in experiments at the Porton Down military research centre which he believed were related to the common cold but in fact involved exposure to nerve agents such as sarin. Unknown to Earl at the time, in the same sequence of tests another serviceman, Ronald Maddison, died soon after exposure to the poison. Much later, in 1999, police began Operation Antler to investigate the experiments; on learning of this, Earl founded the Porton Down Veterans Support Group.

Earl suffered from spinal problems, prostate cancer, and other illnesses.

== Selected filmography ==
- The Two-Headed Spy (1958) – British Soldier (uncredited)
- The Two Faces of Dr. Jekyll (1960) – Young Blood (uncredited)
- Touch of Death (1961) – Mr. Grey
- Clue of the Silver Key (1961) – Detective
- Man Detained (1961) – Detective Sergeant Wentworth
- Attempt to Kill (1961) – Sergeant Bennett
- The Pot Carriers (1962) – Prison Officer (Kitchen)
- Jigsaw (1962) – 2nd Press Man (uncredited)
- Incident at Midnight (1963) – Sergeant
- A Stitch in Time (1963) – TV Cameraman (uncredited)
- Father Came Too! (1963) – Motorcycle Policeman
- Subterfuge (1968) – Policeman
- The Body Stealers (1969) – Sgt. in Lab
- The Haunted House of Horror (1969) – Police Sergeant Pelley
- Scream and Scream Again (1970) – Detective Sgt. Jimmy Joyce
- Diamonds Are Forever (1971) – Immigration Officer (uncredited)
- Action at Dog Island (1972)
- Tales from the Crypt (1972) – Police Sergeant (segment 3 "Poetic Justice")
- All Coppers Are... (1972) – Police Jailer (uncredited)
- Penny Gold (1973) – CID Man (uncredited)
- The Human Factor (1979) – Ferguson
- The Sea Wolves (1980) – Sloane

== Tv appearances ==
- Clue of the Silver Key; Man Detained; Attempt to Kill; and Incident at Midnight, above, were short featurettes in the Edgar Wallace Mysteries series.
