= Graham Sutton =

Welsh mathematician and meteorologist (1903–1977)

Sir Oliver Graham Sutton CBE FRS (4 February 1903 – 26 May 1977) was a Welsh mathematician and meteorologist, notable particularly for theoretical work on atmospheric diffusion, boundary layer turbulence, and for his direction of the UK Meteorological Office.

== Biography ==
Graham Sutton was born at Cwmcarn, Monmouthshire, and educated at Pontywaun Grammar School, the University College of Wales, Aberystwyth, and at Jesus College, Oxford (which elected him to an Honorary Fellowship in 1958).

From 1926 to 1928 he was a lecturer at University College of Wales in Aberystwyth before joining the UK Meteorological Office as an assistant. He was seconded to Shoeburyness to work on the meteorological effects on gunnery practices and then transferred to Porton Down. There he undertook a project on atmospheric turbulence and diffusion which quantified the effect of meteorological conditions on the distribution of gas at ground level, findings which could not be released until after the war. Whilst working at Porton Down he was put in charge of tests related to Operation Vegetarian, which involved the release of anthrax spores over the uninhabited Gruinard Island as part of a biological warfare project.

When the war ended, he was made Chief Superintendent of the Radar Research and Development Establishment, Malvern, a position he held until 1947, when he was appointed Professor of Mathematics at the Royal Military College of Science, Shrivenham, Wiltshire. He was Director-General of the UK Met Office from 1953 to 1965 and Vice-President of the University College of Wales, Aberystwyth from 1967.

== Honours and awards ==
He was elected a Fellow of the Royal Society in March 1949. He was awarded CBE in 1950 for his distinguished scientific services to the government.

He was elected president of the Royal Meteorological Society from 1953 to 1955 and awarded their Symons Gold Medal for 1959. He was knighted in 1955.

In 1958 Sutton was invited to co-deliver the Royal Institution Christmas Lecture. In 1968 he was awarded the prestigious International Meteorological Organization Prize from the World Meteorological Organization.

Trade union offices
Preceded by Richard Redmayne	Honorary President of the Institution of Professional Civil Servants; 1957–1961	Succeeded by Verney Stott
