= List of United States Army Second World War Stations in Suffolk =

This list covers all identifiable locations where United States Army were stationed in Suffolk.

Station	USAAF Station Code	Type	Unit	Feb 1944	Notes
RAF Barnham Little Heath Site	517	Chemical weapons	754 Chemical Depot Company (Aviation); 765 Chemical Depot Company (Aviation)		Subsequently used as a nuclear weapon store
RAF Barnham Warren Woods Site	587	Ammunition	2106 Ordnance Ammunition Battalion	Yes	Subsequently used as a nuclear weapon store
RAF Honington	375	Advanced Depot			
Tostock Park	502	Advanced Depot	1516 Quarter Masters Truck Battalion Combat Support Wing		
