= Keen as Mustard =

1989 documentary film

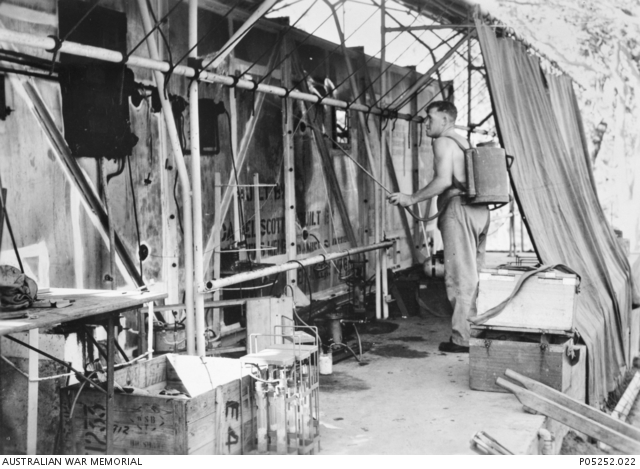
The mark II gas chamber in Innisfail, 1943. The soldier is spraying it with water to decrease the temperature within.

Keen as Mustard is a documentary film researched and directed by Bridget Goodwin detailing secret experiments conducted during World War II on Australian servicemen volunteers to investigate the effects of, and precautions against, mustard gas when used as a weapon in the tropics. The film, released by Film Australia in 1989, contains extensive historic documentary footage and accounts by several participants, and was made possible by the overseas acquisition of documents that remained restricted by the Australian government. A book of the same name was published in 1998, containing much additional material due to the release of some formerly restricted documents by the AWM (Australian War Memorial) in 1992.

== History ==
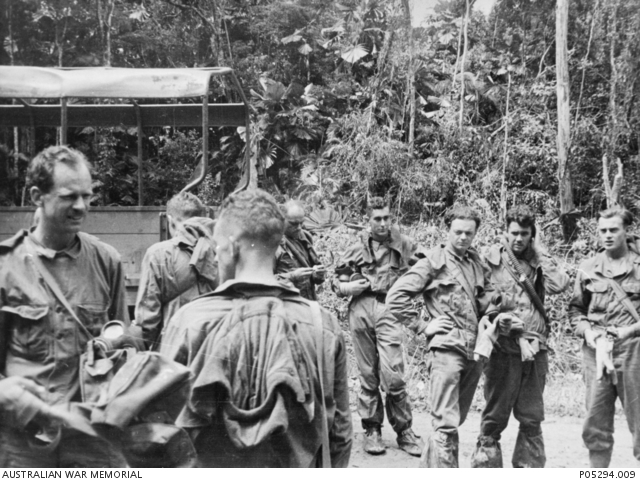
Volunteers for mustard gas human trials being briefed, 1944

In the later days of World War II evidence was found in Papua New Guinea of Japan's preparedness to use chemical weapons, in the form of bombs loaded with a mixture of mustard gas and lewisite. British and American military planners became acutely aware of their lack of knowledge about the effects of such materials on soldiers in tropical areas. An Australian Chemical Warfare Research & Experimental Section was formed in 1942 and a top-secret facility established in Queensland near Innisfail, and later at Gunyarra near Proserpine, where a wide range of tests was performed by British, American and Australian researchers on volunteers from Australian defence personnel, with nurses and laboratory assistants recruited from the Australian Army Medical Women's Service. Initial tests proved that mustard gas was around four times as potent in tropical climates, with greatest aggravation to the skin occurring in the sweaty areas of the groin, buttocks, back of legs, neck and armpits.

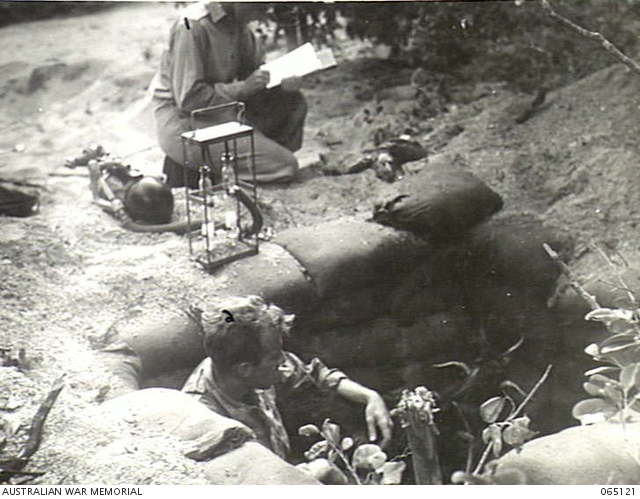
Preparing goats for exposure to mustard gas on North Brook Island, 1944

A large 100 cubic metres (3,500 cu ft) controlled environment stainless-steel gas chamber was designed by biochemists J. W. Legge and (later Professor Sir) Hugh Ennor to house volunteer subjects to ascertain the effectiveness of various materials and designs of protective clothing, during periods of physical exertion and after being subject to normal wear and tear. Other tests were conducted to determine the limits of endurance of soldiers in performing arduous tasks after bodily exposure to mustard gas. Gas masks or respirators were used to minimise inhalation of the gas.

The determined resistance put up by Japanese soldiers against the Americans in their assault on Tarawa in November 1943 prompted the US Army, which had sustained terrible losses in taking the island, to make plans for use of chemical weapons in further attacks of the kind. General Douglas MacArthur was in favor of this approach, heavy naval bombardment having been unexpectedly ineffective at lowering the enemy's resistance. North Brook Island, off the Queensland coast around 30 km east of Cardwell, was prepared with various forms of tunnel and foxhole to simulate the kind of emplacements used by the Japanese army, and goats tethered in these locations. Bombers then carpeted the island with mustard gas bombs and the following day unprotected Australian soldiers were landed on the island to assess the damage, and spent 12 hours there, suffering some lung damage and blisters where their bodies came into contact with contaminated foliage.

The Allies never used gas against the enemy, as Japan surrendered following the dropping of atom bombs on Hiroshima and Nagasaki. The Chemical Warfare Unit was top secret and its very existence was denied for many years. Many of the volunteers had never served overseas, and so did not receive the monitoring and preferential health treatment accorded other ex-servicemen by the Department of Veterans' Affairs. Mustard gas is known to damage DNA by alkylation, and it has been suggested that the experiments were responsible for adverse long-term health effects on some of these volunteers.

== Recognition ==
The film was in 1989 Highly Commended in the Walkley Awards for Australian Journalism.

== The author ==
Bridget Goodwin was a journalist working for the Australian Broadcasting Corporation before turning her hand to documentary film making. She has also produced documentary films about the author Hugh Lunn, the Henry Lawson Festival in Grenfell, New South Wales and Professor Manning Clark.

== Bibliography ==
- Goodwin, Bridget Keen as mustard: Britain's horrific chemical warfare experiments in Australia. (1998) University of Queensland Press, St. Lucia,. ISBN 978-0-7022-2941-1.
- Bridget Goodwin (director) Keen as Mustard (1989) Film A VHS video was released by Film Australia in 1993.

== Availability ==
- A DVD version and a pay-per-view download are available from Ronin Films.

== Further information ==
The Brook Island trials were much more extensive than this documentary film suggests, relying largely on the evidence of a few participants. There were at least three major trials on the island, listed here. This article also mentions unsubstantiated stories about the use of human guinea-pig volunteers from American prisons.

The Australian War Memorial, Canberra, has a great deal of material, freely available, related to the Australian Chemical Warfare Research & Experimental Section, some of which is reproduced here.

Goodwin wrote an essay on her research and the making of the film for the series "Working with Knowledge" conference papers online, Session 6 entitled "Science Archives: Humanising and Popularising the Stories", available here

== See also ==
- Rawalpindi experiments
