= Operation Antler =

Operation Antler may refer to:

- Operation Antler (nuclear tests), a series of nuclear tests conducted at Maralinga, Australia, between 14 September and 9 October 1957.
- Operation Antler (Porton Down investigation), the investigation into events at Porton Down in the period from 1939 to 1989
