= Little Heath, Barnham =

Protected area in Suffolk, England

Coordinates: 52.37°N 0.72°E

- Site of Special Scientific Interest
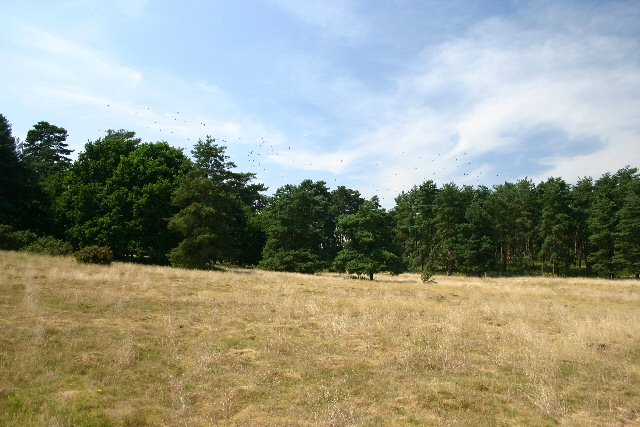
- Location of Little Heath, Barnham.
- Area of search: Suffolk
- Grid reference: TL 850 781
- Interest: Biological
- Area: 46.2 hectares
- Notification date: 1984
- Location map: Magic Map

Little Heath, Barnham lies south-west of Barnham, Suffolk. Much of the area is now a Site of Special Scientific Interest, which almost surrounds the former chemical weapon store and filling station (FFD1)

== Site of Special Scientific Interest ==
This is a biological Site of Special Scientific Interest, which covers an area of 46.2 hectare. It is a Nature Conservation Review site, Grade I, and part of the Breckland Special Protection Area under the European Union Directive on the Conservation of Wild Birds

Grazing by rabbits and sheep helps to keep the sward on parts of this site as open grassland, but some parts have been invaded by self-sown woodland. The diverse flora in areas grazed by sheep includes field woodrush, hare's foot clover and harebell. Stone curlews nest on short and open turf.

There is access by footpaths from Barnham.

== Little Heath Forward Filling Depot ==
During World War One, Little Heath was used for tank testing and mustard gas was produced at Triangle Plantation, at the north end of the Heath. During the Second World War, the area was part of RAF Barnham, under the control of 94 Maintenance Unit. It took bulk deliveries of mustard gas from M. S. Factory, Valley and used it to fill bombs and shells. Known as FFD1 (Forward Filling Depot 1) it was one of five such depots, all in the east of England. and was situated by the, now dismantled, railway line from Thetford to Bury St Edmunds which fed into the works via a short siding. The depot had three 500 ton underground storage "pots" for the gas, which was used to fill weapons from 1944 to 1945.

After the war, the site was used to dismantle the weapons until 1949. Some gas remained on site, in the underground "pots", until 1954, but it was not until 1996 that the site was fully decontaminated and sold. Several of the above ground buildings remained and were used by the East England Military Museum.

Recently the site has undergone significant redevelopment and is no longer a museum. The majority of the original buildings have been demolished

== See also ==
- Chemical weapons and the United Kingdom
