= Alleged British use of chemical weapons in the Iraqi Revolt =

Alleged military operations of the British Empire during the Iraqi revolt

The majority view among historians is that the British mandatory government considered but did not use chemical weapons in the Iraqi revolt (Ath Thawra al Iraqiyya al Kubra), for practical and political reasons.

Tear gas artillery shells were transported to Iraq and approval was given for their use, but tests by the army found them to be impractical and they were not used in combat. Efforts to develop gas weapons for use in Iraq were halted by the British over concerns about embarrassing political repercussions following the signing of the Washington Disarmament Treaty, which contained a provision outlawing poison gas, although the British government held that the use of tear gas remained legally permissible. Practical difficulties ultimately prevented the use of gas, rather than any moral inhibitions.

== British policy on use of gas ==
The British 1914 Manual of Military Law stated that the rules of war applied only to conflict "between civilized nations". It stated that "they do not apply in wars with uncivilized States and tribes", but the British commander in any conflict he partook in should observe "the rules of justice and humanity", according to his own individual discretion.

Some gas shells and protective clothing were shipped to British India in July 1919, with a further small shipment in January 1920, for use on the North-West Frontier. However, a requisition for 16,000 shells and 10,000 gas masks was blocked by Lord Sinha, the Under-Secretary of State for India. He believed that a first use of chemical weapons by British and Indian forces would have serious implications, both moral and political, and that chemical weapons should be used only in retaliation for an Afghan or North-West Frontier Tribal chemical attack. In India, a temporary Travelling Gas School was set up in September 1920, but the matter then lapsed.

Britain had used gas weapons in the Middle East, most notably in the Second Battle of Gaza against Ottoman forces in World War I. On that occasion, the use of gas did not prevent a British military defeat.

The use of tear gas, not "only the most deadly gases", was considered; as shown in a War Office minute of 12 May 1919 in which Winston Churchill argued:

I do not understand this squeamishness about the use of gas. We have definitely adopted the position at the Peace Conference of arguing in favour of the retention of gas as a permanent method of warfare. It is sheer affectation to lacerate a man with the poisonous fragment of a bursting shell and to boggle at making his eyes water by means of lachrymatory gas. I am strongly in favour of using poisoned gas against uncivilised tribes. The moral effect should be so good that the loss of life should be reduced to a minimum. It is not necessary to use only the most deadly gasses: gasses can be used which cause great inconvenience and would spread a lively terror and yet would leave no serious permanent effects on most of those affected.

== Allegations that gas was used ==
Historian Charles Townshend made the "first assertion of British chemical weapons use in Iraq" in his 1986 essay Civilisation and "Frightfulness": Air Control in the Middle East Between the Wars:

Britain was not a free agent in the middle east, and would have to defer to the universal prejudice against all forms of gas. In vain did the Air Ministry stress that lethal concentrations were most unlikely to be reached under air bombardment (because - though this point was not stressed - of its low accuracy). In vain did they point out that the army had used SK gas shells in quantity against the Mesopotamian rebels in 1920 with 'excellent moral effect'.

In his book World Orders Old and New, Noam Chomsky claimed that Winston Churchill, then-Secretary of State for War and Air, was particularly keen on chemical weapons, suggesting they be used "against recalcitrant Arabs as an experiment". Churchill dismissed objections to the use of chemical weapons as "unreasonable" and stated: "I am strongly in favour of using poisoned gas against uncivilised tribes".

In March and July 1992, US Representative Henry B. González, speaking in the House of Representatives, claimed that Britain used chemical weapons during the Iraqi–Kurdish conflict.

The main source usually quoted in support of the idea that Britain used poison gas in Mesopotamia is Geoff Simons, Iraq: From Sumer to Saddam (1994), who stated that "gas was used against the Iraqi rebels in 1920". In the third edition of his book, Iraq: From Sumer to post-Saddam (2004), Simons wrote: "In the event, gas was used against the Iraqi rebels in 1920 with "excellent moral effect", though gas shells were not dropped from aircraft because of practical difficulties".

== Disputation of the allegations ==
Another historian, Lawrence James, stated, "By September the local commander, General Sir Aylmer Haldane, was beginning to get the upper hand, although he was still desperate enough to clamour for large supplies of poison gas. It was not needed, for air power had given his forces the edge whenever the going got tough". On whether gas was used he writes that: "RAF Officers asked Churchill ... for use of poison gas. He agreed but it was not used".

Niall Ferguson, in his 2006 book The War of the World, wrote: "To end the Iraqi Insurgency of 1920 ... the British relied on a combination of aerial bombardment and punitive village burning expeditions. Indeed, they even contemplated using mustard gas too, though supplies proved unavailable". Anthony Clayton wrote in The Oxford History of the British Empire that "the use of poisonous gas was never sanctioned".

A December 2009 article in the Journal of Modern History by R. M. Douglas of Colgate University went through the surviving documentary sources and concluded that "while at various moments tear gas munitions were available in Mesopotamia, circumstances seeming to call for their use existed, and official sanction to employ them had been received, at no time during the period of the mandate did all three of these conditions apply" and that it was clear that no poison gas was used.

Douglas noted that Churchill authorised a shipment of artillery shells containing ethyl iodoacetate, a tear gas, from Egypt to Iraq on 17 September 1920 for use by the army, but after trials on British soldiers the large quantity of shells needed to produce a significant irritant effect was found to be logistically impractical. The air force remained enthusiastic about the use of gas, and on 9 January 1922 Churchill approved the conversion of gas artillery shells for use from aircraft. However, this plan was halted by Churchill on 31 January under pressure from the Air Council as the Washington Disarmament Treaty, signed on 7 January at the Washington Naval Conference, had included a provision (article 5) prohibiting the use of "asphyxiating, poisonous or other gases". The War Office also instructed the Mesopotamian Expeditionary Force in February that "as a result of a decision of the Washington Conference, it has been decided that the use of gas in any form is inadmissible."

Douglas observed that contradictory claims by historians and commentators surrounding the use of gas in Iraq were partly the product of an inaccurate September 1921 letter by J. A. Webster, assistant secretary at the Air Ministry, claiming that poison gas shells had already been used the army during the previous year's rebellion. In December 1921 the Air Ministry revised its position, stating that "it is not known whether [gas shells] were used by the Army". The Army General Headquarters (GHQ) in Baghdad had informed Percy Cox in November that "gas shells have not been used hitherto against tribesmen either by aeroplanes or by artillery". Douglas also noted that Churchill's forceful 1919 memo in support of gas had served to convince observers that weapons of mass destruction had been used when in fact they had not been, which ironically paralleled events in 2003.

== See also ==
- Chemical weapons and the United Kingdom
- RAF Iraq Command
- Spanish use of chemical weapons in the Rif War
