= Operation Cauldron =

1952 British biological warfare experiment

- Type: Series of secret biological warfare trials
- Location: Off the coast of the Isle of Lewis in the Outer Hebrides
- Planned by: British government
- Objective: Releasing biological agents, including pneumonic and bubonic plague, brucellosis and tularaemia and testing the effects of the agents on caged monkeys and guinea pigs
- Date: 1952
- Executed by: Scientists from Porton Down and the Royal Navy
- Outcome: Failure

Operation Cauldron was a series of secret biological warfare trials undertaken by the British government in 1952. Scientists from Porton Down and the Royal Navy were involved in releasing biological agents, including pneumonic and bubonic plague, brucellosis and tularaemia and testing the effects of the agents on caged monkeys and guinea pigs.

While the tests were carried out by Britain, the tests were a joint Anglo-US-Canadian operation, with a US Navy Lieutenant Commander taking part. US documents showed that the operation was not purely defensive, as later claimed; at a joint 1958 conference in Canada the US chemical corps minuted "it was agreed ... studies should be continued on aerosols ... all three countries should concentrate on the search for incapacitating and new-type lethal agents".

== The tests ==
The experiments were carried out at sea, off the coast of the Isle of Lewis in the Outer Hebrides, aboard a floating pontoon, supported by the ship Ben Lomond. The test animals were placed in cages on the deck of the pontoon and biological agents dispersed either from a bomb suspended from a boom or by being sprayed. After being exposed, the animals were taken aboard the Ben Lomond and those that died were dissected to determine the cause of death. 3,492 guinea pigs and 83 monkeys were used in the tests.

The tests were initially judged to be a success, both in terms of the effectiveness of the biological agents and the test platform. However, a year later, this decision was reversed, with the tests on plague bacteria being described as a "failure" and the statement that "brucellosis has not increased its reputation as a dangerous agent."

== Carella incident ==
In the final test of the series, the Fleetwood-based trawler Carella, with a crew of eighteen, ignored warnings to steer clear and unwittingly sailed through a cloud of plague bacteria (Yersinia pestis) on its way to a fishing trip to the waters around Iceland, causing concern about a possible plague outbreak around its home port in north-west England. The Carella was not stopped for disinfection or medical examination but was kept under covert observation by a destroyer and a fisheries vessel for twenty-one days, and the ship's radio communications were monitored for any kind of medical distress call. The surveillance period included a period of shore-leave at Blackpool, during which the crew mixed with the people of the town as usual. None of the crew became ill.

The incident was dealt with at the highest levels of government, going through the First Sea Lord to the Chancellor of the Exchequer Rab Butler, who was deputising for the absent Winston Churchill. The event was successfully covered up at the time and, after the danger had passed, most of the documents relevant to the case were ordered to be burnt. Even the crew of the Carella were unaware of the incident until approached by a BBC documentary crew more than fifty years later.

Civil servant Clive Ponting, who had been acquitted by a jury in a "perverse verdict" after leaking secret documents about the sinking of the ARA General Belgrano in the Falklands War, in 1985 came across the one file that had not been destroyed, and confidentially told The Observer newspaper about it, leading to a story that July headlined British germ bomb sprayed trawler.

== Ministerial intervention ==
In 1979 Western Isles MP Donald Stewart, aware of rumours about the trial, questioned Defence Secretary Francis Pym about them in Parliament. Pym gave reassurances that "they did not impinge in any way on the general public". The Observer's report about this incorrect statement commented that there was no reason to think that he had any idea of the truth.

In 1994, the local Member of Parliament, Calum Macdonald called upon the then-Secretary of State for Defence, Malcolm Rifkind, to commission an independent report on Operations Cauldron and Hesperus in 1952 and 1953, and all similar chemical weapons tests about which the public reasonably seek reassurance. An initial Commons question by him to the Ministry Of Defence was referred to the director-general of the Chemical and Biological Defence Establishment at Porton Down, Wiltshire.

In his letter, Dr Pearson said: The papers on Operations Cauldron and Hesperus are classified, and it would not be in the national interest to make these available as the information therein could be misused by states seeking to acquire a biological weapons capability.

The pathogens used were as follows: (a) Operation Cauldron: the pathogens that cause brucellosis and plague. (b) Operation Hesperus: the pathogens that cause brucellosis and tularaemia. Dr Pearson added: The safety aspects of handling, transport and packaging were all carefully addressed to ensure there was no danger to any of those engaged in the trial.

There is no cause to believe that there was any hazard to the public or the environment and there is no evidence to the contrary.

Mr MacDonald responded at the time saying: This reply is deeply unsatisfactory and does not provide any of the reassurances which I and my constituents seek about the tests.

He continued to outline his belief that it was not satisfactory that the same Government organisation which carried out potentially highly dangerous experiments should be allowed to pass the final judgment on itself regarding the health implications both then and subsequently.

== Ruling against the MOD ==
On the 21st of January 2008 the Information Commissioner's Office ruled against the MOD to release a video they made on Operation Cauldron. The video contains images of identifiable individuals, and the MOD argued that it would need to obscure or mask the faces of the individuals, as this information would be exempt under sections 38, 40(2) and 44 of the Act. The MOD estimated that the process of masking would exceed the cost limit as set out in section 12 of the Act, and therefore refused the complainant's request. The Commissioner found that the footage did contain images of identifiable individuals, some of whom may still be alive, but that disclosure of the footage would not breach any of the data protection principles. For this reason the Commissioner found that the MOD wrongly applied the exemption under sections 38, 40(2) and 44, and the cost limit under section 12. The Commissioner therefore directed the MOD to disclose the footage in full.

The video released was about 47 minutes long and showed the pontoon which was situated off the coast of the Tolsta District on the North East of the Isle of Lewis. The exact location was between Cellar head and Tolsta head. Many of the Tolsta villagers can remember the ship and seeing white gas clouds in the testing. The video shows a flight coming in and describes the arrival of the biological agents from the Microbiological Research Department (MRD) at Porton Down. On the pontoon they placed the animals in small boxes and released the agents, before returning after to check the results and burning the dead animals.
