= Tostock Park =

United States Army air base in Suffolk, England

Tostock Park
- Near Bury St Edmunds, Suffolk in England

Site information
- Type: Combat Support Wing (US Visiting Forces)
- Owner: Ministry of Defence
- Operator: US Army Air Forces (1942–1946)
- Condition: Closed

Location
- Location in Suffolk
- Coordinates: 52.235°N 0.862°E

Site history
- Built: 1938–1940
- In use: 1942–1946

During the Second World War Tostock Park was a sub-station of the United States Army Air Force, located in Tostock, near Bury St Edmunds, Suffolk. It was allocated Station No. 502, and supported by RAF Burtonwood.

The base was garrisoned by African-American soldiers from the 1517 Quartermaster (Battalion Mobile) (Aviation), consisting of:

- 1970 Quartermaster Truck Company (Aviation)
- 2023 Quartermaster Truck Company (Aviation)
- 2024 Quartermaster Truck Company (Aviation)
- 2104 Quartermaster Truck Company (Aviation) based in the neighbouring village of Drinkstone.

== African-American Soldiers at Tostock Park ==
The arrival of thousands of American servicemen throughout East Anglia became known as ‘The Friendly Invasion’ and the goodwill demonstrated by the villagers of Tostock towards ‘the yanks’ was extended in no small measure to the black servicemen who in turn frequented the village pub and hosted dances and parties for the locals on the military base which had become their temporary home overseas.

=== Brown Babies of African-American GIs at Tostock Park ===
Many of these African American soldiers struck up romances with local British women. During one of these parties, William Ellis who was serving in the 9th USAAF met with Olive Bumpstead before the allied forces' onslaught on Europe. Olive gave birth to their child, a Brown Baby, in November 1944 when William was already sent to France. And sadly, William was never heard from again. Their baby Eldridge William Marriott's last name belonged to Olive's then-husband who got soon divorced because she was not willing to cut ties with her newborn baby. William was then raised by his grandparents, aunt and uncle, who owned a cottage at Tostock Park.

Besides William, a bunch of mixed-race children were also living at Tostock Park. Some of them attended the Elmswell Primary School with William. Most of them spent their entire childhood at Tostock Park and ascended to Beyton Middle School and most of them experienced a welcoming atmosphere and acceptance by the other children and teachers.
