= Dark Harvest Commando =

Scottish militant environmental organization

The Dark Harvest Commando of the Scottish Citizen Army (DHC) was a militant group which in 1981 demanded that the British government decontaminate Gruinard Island, a site which had been used for anthrax weapon testing during World War II. They distributed on the mainland potentially anthrax-laden soil.

The group identified itself as "Dark Harvest Commando" and claimed to include a "team of microbiologists from two universities" in Scotland. In a message to the Glasgow Herald, the group said they had landed on the island with the aid of local people and removed 300 lb (140 kg) of soil contaminated with anthrax spores, to be placed around the UK.

The group placed a container of soil outside the Chemical Defence Establishment at Porton Down in Wiltshire. Five days later, a second container of soil was placed at Blackpool, a resort town where the Conservative Party was holding a conference presided over by Margaret Thatcher. The first container was found to contain Bacillus anthracis (the causative agent of anthrax), while the second was uncontaminated but of the same soil type as found on the island. At the end of the year, the group announced they would take no further action through a message pinned to the doors of the Scottish Office in Edinburgh. Gruinard Island was eventually decontaminated in 1986.

In his novel The Impossible Dead (2011), author Ian Rankin, in addition to using the mysterious death of Willie McRae for his plot, also mentions the clandestine events surrounding the removal of contaminated soils from Gruinard Island by the Dark Harvest Commandos and the island's removal from maps by the British Government.
