= Operation Vegetarian =

Unused British biowarfare plan (1942–44)

Operation Vegetarian was an unused British biowarfare military operation plan developed from 1942 to 1944 during World War II. The plan consisted of disseminating linseed press cakes infected with anthrax spores into the countryside of Nazi Germany. These cakes would have been eaten by the cattle, which would then be consumed by the human population, leading to widespread death and disruption. Furthermore, it would have wiped out the majority of Germany's cattle, creating a massive food shortage for the rest of the population that remained uninfected. Preparations were not complete until early 1944, when the plan was abandoned due to Operation Overlord; the linseed cakes were destroyed by incineration in 1945.

== History ==
=== Production ===
Efforts to research the feasibility of Operation Vegetarian began in 1942 with the director of the Porton Down biology department, Paul Fildes. He was ordered to find appropriate suppliers of the chemicals needed for production of both the anthrax and the cakes themselves, along with the specialized containers to carry them to prevent contamination during transport. This also meant that some RAF planes had to be modified in order to drop the non-munitions payloads without destroying them in the process. The linseed cake production was outsourced to the Olympia Oil and Cake Company based in Blackburn Meadows in order to produce large batches of full cakes. The slicing of the cakes into the appropriate sizes was given to a soap manufacturer business named J & E Atkinson. They were contracted to cut cakes into sizes of "2.5cm in diameter and 10 grammes in weight" and on the order of 180,000 to 250,000 pieces per week, with a final goal of 5,273,400 cakes by the end date of April 1943.

The anthrax bacteria were produced internally by the government at a lab operated by the Ministry of Agriculture, Fisheries and Food with another employed scientist being responsible for figuring out the injection method in order to introduce the anthrax into the linseed cake slices. The actual task of injecting the anthrax was given to 13 women who previously worked as soap makers. The containers decided upon to house the cakes and allow for easy deployment and later access by cattle were 18 centimeter square cardboard boxes that could hold up to 400 cakes each, along with a steel handle so that they could be moved with minimal contact.

The final production task was how they were to be attached to and deployed from the RAF planes. Eventually, the RAF came up with a wooden tray system that could be attached to the flare chutes for release. The planes modified for this task were Avro Lancasters, Handley Page Halifaxs, and Short Stirlings.

=== Testing and deployment ===
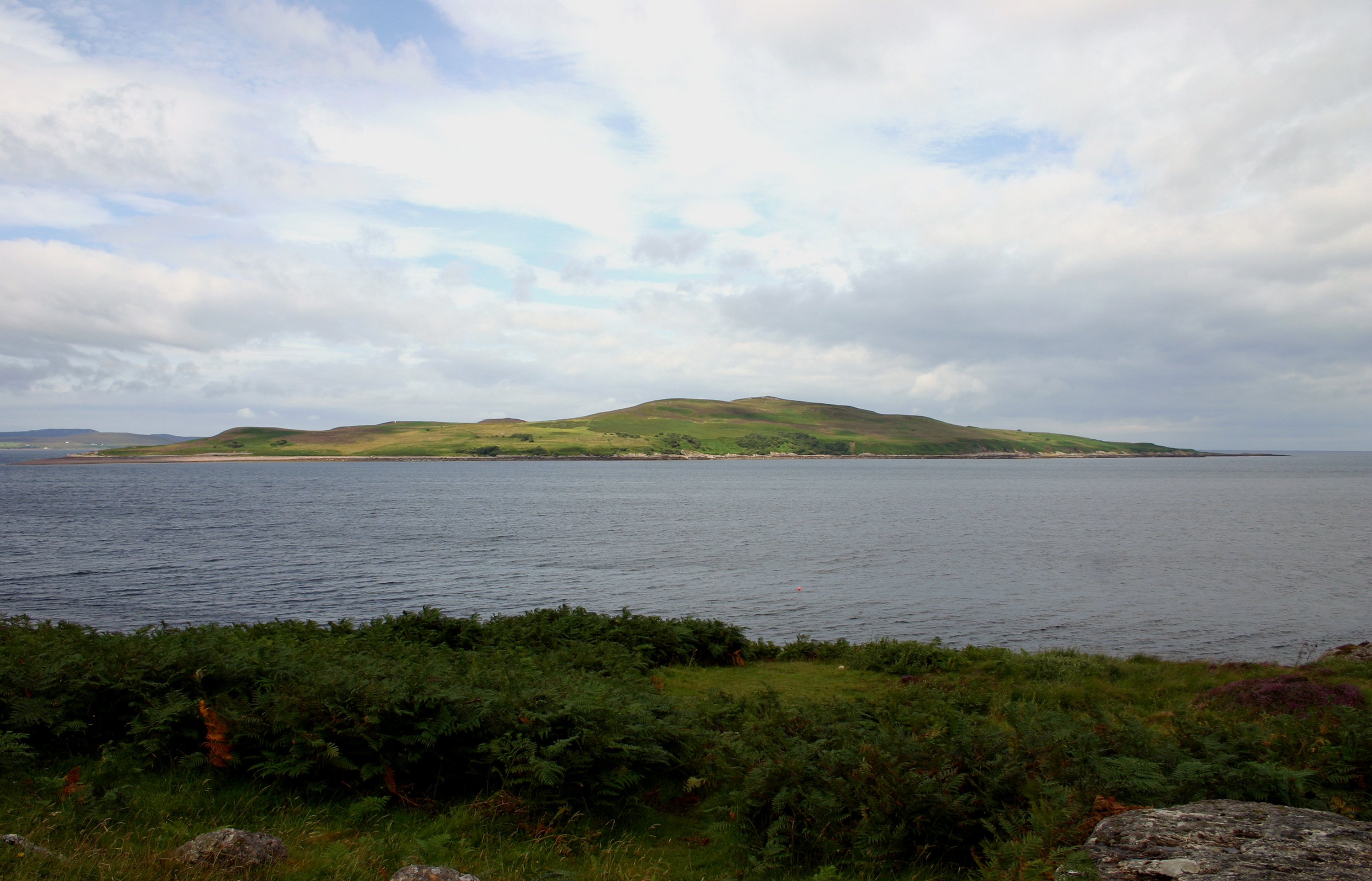
Gruinard Island off the coast of Scotland, the testing site

The testing of anthrax as an animal elimination method was done on Gruinard Island, just off the coast of Scotland. The location was chosen because of its small size, only 520 total acres, and its lack of inhabitants, along with there being a nearby military base at Loch Ewe that served as a staging area. Original tests on the effectiveness of anthrax were conducted on the island in 1940 and 1941 with the bacteria being included in a bomb, which was dropped on 60 sheep that had been shipped to the island. The bomb itself contained a thick slurry of concentrated anthrax spores and was dropped from a Vickers Wellington bomber. This test proved more effective than expected, with all the sheep dying in days, but also infecting a number of farm animals on the mainland months afterward. It was determined later that one of the buried sheep carcasses had become unearthed due to a major storm and washed ashore. Other tests continued until 1943 when the risk of infecting nearby populations became too great and the island was quarantined from all boat and plane traffic. Because of the widespread contamination from the anthrax spores, the land remained closed until 1990.

Operation Vegetarian was ready for deployment by spring of 1944 and plans were drafted for the cakes to be dropped in the summer when German cattle would be grazing openly in the fields. In order to entice the cattle into eating the linseed cakes, they needed to be dropped after the spring grass had been consumed and the amount of food left was limited. The raid and airdrops needed to be done in a single action and as quickly as possible to prevent the German military discovering what was being dropped. Fildes estimated that a flight path through Oldenburg and Hanover could be achieved in 18 minutes and cover 60 miles of cattle grazing land. But by the time the summer arrived, the Normandy Invasion had occurred and Allied troops were advancing across northern Europe, causing Operation Vegetarian to be abandoned. The five million cakes made to be disseminated in Germany were eventually destroyed in an incinerator shortly after the end of World War II.

== Popular media ==
In his novel The Impossible Dead (2011), author Ian Rankin mentions the clandestine events surrounding the removal of contaminated soils from Gruinard Island by a protest group, the Dark Harvest Commando, and the island's removal from maps by the British Government. The island also features as the principal setting for the 1985 novel El año de Gracia, by Cristina Fernández Cubas, in which the protagonist spends a winter shipwrecked on the island.

== See also ==
- Chemical weapons and the United Kingdom
- Paul Fildes
