= Ronald Maddison =

British RAF mechanic killed in a nerve agent experiment

Ronald George Maddison
- Born: 23 January 1933; Consett, County Durham, England
- Died: 6 May 1953 (aged 20); Porton Down, Wiltshire, England
- Military career
- Allegiance: United Kingdom
- Branch: Royal Air Force
- Rank: Leading Aircraftman

Leading Aircraftman Ronald George Maddison (23 January 1933 – 6 May 1953) was a twenty-year-old Royal Air Force mechanic who was unlawfully killed as the result of exposure to nerve agents while acting as a voluntary test subject at Porton Down, in Wiltshire, England. After substantial controversy, his death was the subject of an inquest 51 years after the event.

== Sarin test and death ==
Porton Down had been testing sarin on humans since October 1951, but the first adverse reaction was not recorded until February 1953. An even more severe reaction occurred on 27 April when one of six volunteers, a man named John Patrick Kelly, was exposed to 300 milligrams of sarin and fell into a coma but subsequently recovered. This prompted a reduction in the dose used in this series of experiments to 200 mg.

Along with other servicemen, Maddison was offered 15 shillings and a three-day leave pass for taking part in the experiments. He had planned to use the money to purchase an engagement ring for his girlfriend, Mary Pyle.

On the day he died, Ronald Maddison entered a gas chamber at 10:00 a.m. along with five other test subjects. They were each to have an identical experiment performed on them which was part of a series of experiments to determine the lethal dose of sarin when delivered to bare or battle dress-covered skin. The method used was to measure the change in active acetylcholinesterase in red blood cells at small dose levels and extrapolate this to work out what the effect of larger doses would be. Sarin is extremely poisonous because it attacks the nervous system by blocking the activity of cholinesterase enzymes present in it, including acetylcholinesterase. The method was practical because red blood cell membranes contain forms of acetylcholinesterase.

The participants were wearing respirators, with woollen hats and oversize overalls but no proper protective clothing. Two technicians were also present to carry out the experiment. The respirators were tested by exposing the men to tear gas in the chamber before the experiment started.

Maddison was the fourth to have the drops applied, at 10:17 having twenty 10 mg drops of sarin applied to the two layers of cloth used in uniforms, serge and flannel, which had been taped to the inside of his left forearm. After twenty minutes, Maddison began to sweat and complain that he did not feel well. One eye witness reported at the second inquest that he slumped over the table. The contaminated cloth was removed and he left the chamber, walking (perhaps with help) about 30 metres to a bench.

An ambulance was called and shortly afterwards Maddison complained of deafness, collapsed and began gasping for breath and the scientists injected him with atropine after they witnessed an asthma-like attack and convulsions. An ambulance took him to the site's local medical facility, where he arrived at 10:47. Attempts were made to resuscitate him using oxygen, further injections of atropine and anacardone, and finally an injection of adrenaline into his heart just after 11 am. Although he had died at 11 am, less than 45 minutes after being exposed to the poison, he was not formally pronounced dead until 1:30 pm.

== Aftermath ==
The post mortem was carried out in Salisbury Infirmary. On 8 and 16 May 1953, an inquest was held in secret before the Wiltshire Coroner, Harold Dale, who returned a verdict of misadventure. Maddison's father was permitted to attend the inquest but warned that he would be prosecuted under the Official Secrets Act if he informed anyone, including his family, of the circumstances surrounding his son's death. An internal court of inquiry at Porton Down found that Maddison had died because of "personal idiosyncrasy", either because he was unusually sensitive to the poison or his skin absorbed it faster than in other test subjects.

The Ministry of Defence delivered Ronald Maddison's body in a steel coffin with the lid bolted down to maintain secrecy. A large number of samples of body parts including brain and spinal cord tissue, skin, muscle, stomach, lung, and gut were retained without his family's knowledge or permission and used over several years in other toxicology experiments. Maddison's father, John Maddison, was paid £40 to cover the funeral expenses, made up of £20 for black clothes, £16 for undertaker's fees and £4 for catering.

== Second inquest ==
Operation Antler was a police investigation from 1999 to 2004 into Maddison's death, and into allegations that other British chemical-weapons test participants between 1939 and 1989 had not been properly informed and may have been misled about the experiments and their risks.

As a result of the investigation, and campaigning by Ronald Maddison's family, Lord Chief Justice Lord Woolf, sitting with Mrs Justice Hallett in the High Court quashed the original inquest verdict in November 2002. A new inquest opened on 5 May 2004 and was the longest held in England and Wales up to that time, hearing around 100 witnesses over 50 days. On 15 November 2004, the inquest jury returned the verdict that Ronald Maddison had been unlawfully killed.

The Ministry of Defence applied for a judicial review to quash the unlawful killing verdict, although the government announced that whatever the outcome they would look "favourably" upon paying compensation to Maddison's family. In February 2006 an agreement was struck within the framework of the judicial review whereby the MoD accepted the inquest verdict on the grounds that Maddison had died through "gross negligence in the planning and conduct of the experiment". The MoD did not accept that there was sufficient evidence to conclude that Maddison had not given his informed consent to take part. Ronald Maddison's relatives received a total of £100,000 in compensation from the Ministry of Defence.

The Crown Prosecution Service announced in 2003 that there was insufficient evidence to charge anyone responsible for the tests, but that they would review this decision following Maddison's second inquest. In June 2006, they confirmed that there would be no prosecutions.

== See also ==
- United Kingdom and weapons of mass destruction
- Chemical warfare
