= Gruinard Island =

Island off the coast of Scotland

Eilean Ghruinneart (Gaelic)
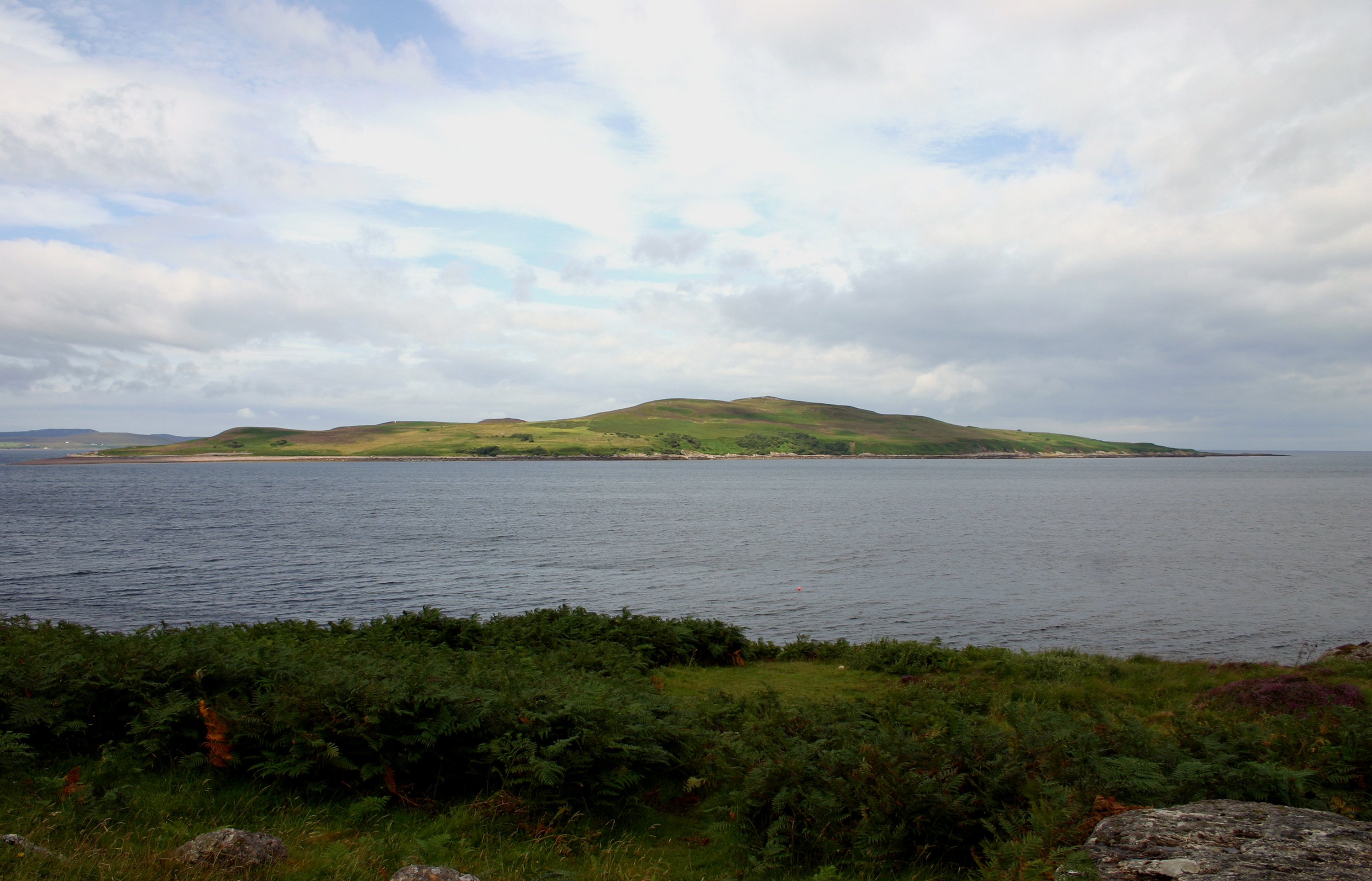

Location
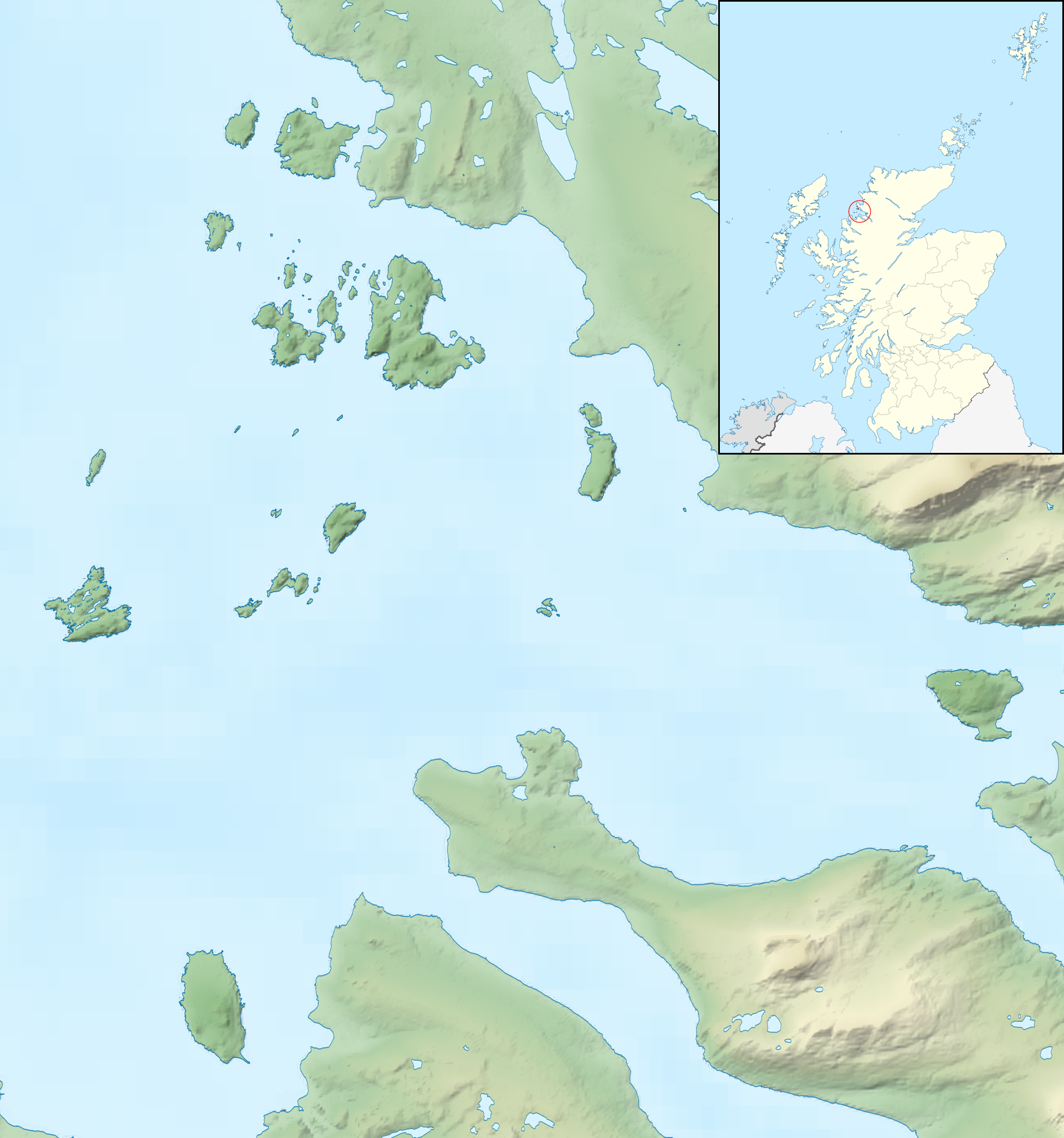
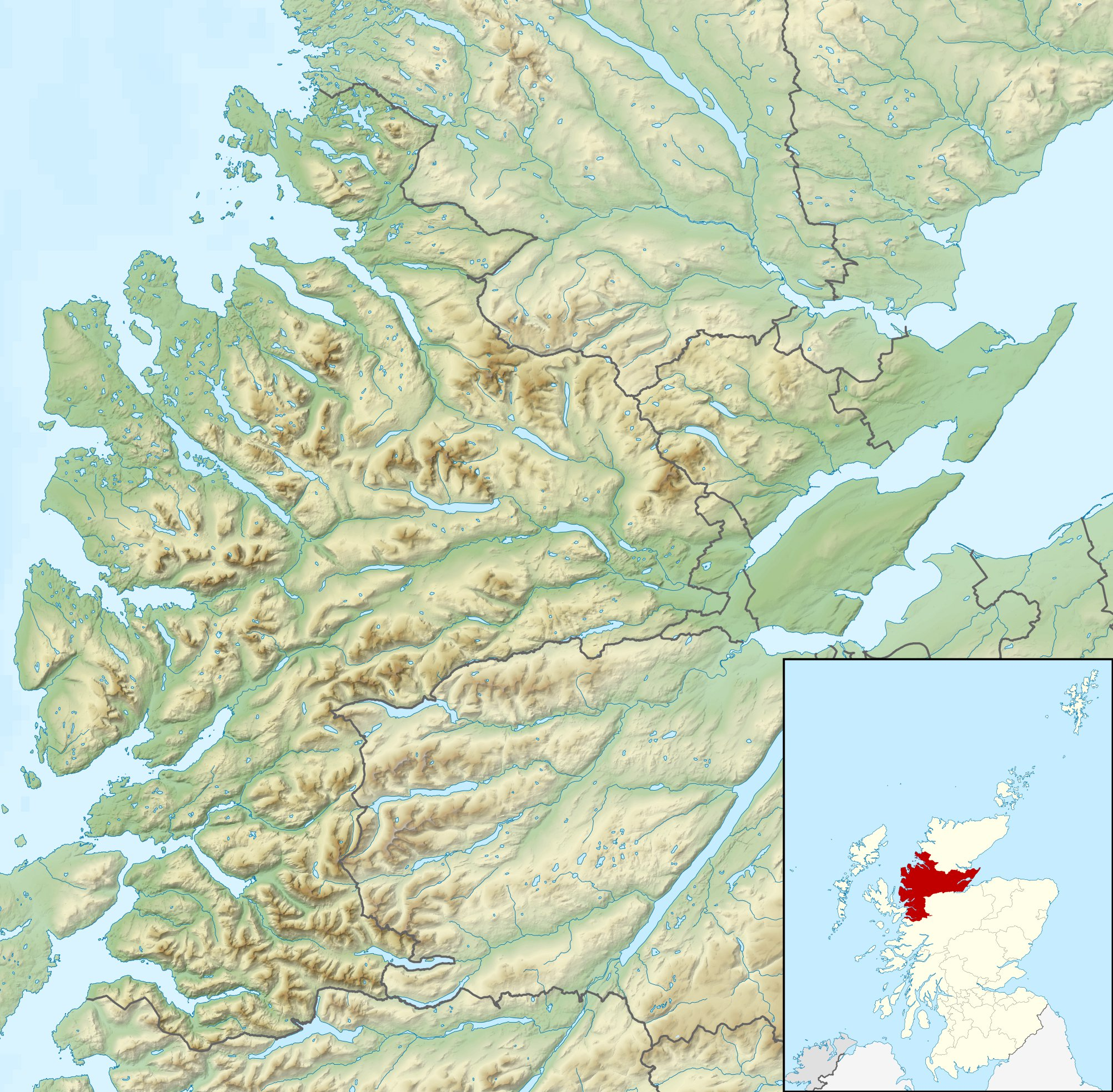
- Gruinard Island shown alongside the neighbouring Summer Isles Gruinard Island within Ross and Cromarty
- OS grid reference: NG945945
- Coordinates: 57°53′24″N 05°28′12″W

Name
- Name meaning: "Shallow firth", from Norse
- Old Norse name: Grunnfjörðr

Physical geography
- Island group: Inner Hebrides/Islands of Ross and Cromarty
- Area: 196 ha (3/4 sq mi)
- Area rank: 111
- Highest elevation: An Eilid, 106 m (348 ft)

Administration
- Council area: Highland
- Country: Scotland
- Sovereign state: United Kingdom

Demographics
- Population: 0
- Largest settlement: None

Gruinard Island (/ˈɡrɪnjərd/ GRIN-yərd; Scottish Gaelic: Eilean Ghruinneard) is a small, oval-shaped Scottish island approximately two kilometres (1 1/4 miles) long by one kilometre (5/8 mi) wide, located in Gruinard Bay, about halfway between Gairloch and Ullapool. At its closest point to the mainland, it is about one kilometre (one-half nautical mile) offshore. In 1942, the island became a sacrifice zone, and was dangerous for all mammals after military experiments with the anthrax bacterium, until it was decontaminated in 1990.

== Early history ==
The island was mentioned by Dean Munro who travelled the area in the mid-16th century. He wrote that it was Clan MacKenzie territory, "full of woods" (it is treeless today), and that it was "guid for fostering of thieves and rebellis".

Historically, the counties of Ross-shire and Cromartyshire have both laid claim to Gruinard Island due to the position of the island in between Gairloch and Ullapool. In the late 1780s, the villages became substantial fishing and sheep farming communities leading Gruinard Island to be utilized as an area of land for grazing sheep or as a small dock for fishing. By 1881, the population on the island was six, soon becoming uninhabited with no record detailing any established population.

In 1926, Rosalynd Maitland purchased the Eilean Darach estate which included Gruinard Island. Rosalynd Maitland bequeathed the island to her niece Molly Dunphie, who was friends with Winston Churchill.

== Biological warfare testing ==
In 1942, during World War II, a biological warfare test was carried out on Gruinard by scientists from the Biology Department of Porton Down. The test was conducted as part of Operation Vegetarian, an ultimately unused plan which called for the dispersal of linseed cakes spiked with anthrax across the German countryside. It was recognised that tests would cause long-lasting contamination of the immediate area by anthrax spores, so a remote and uninhabited island was required. Gruinard was surveyed, deemed suitable, and requisitioned from its owners by the British government. Porton Down meteorologist Sir Oliver Graham Sutton was put in charge of a fifty-man team to conduct the trial, with David Willis Wilson Henderson in charge of the germ bomb. Biology Department head Paul Fildes made frequent visits.

The anthrax strain chosen was a highly virulent type called "Vollum 14578", named after Roy Lars Vollum (1899–1970), a professor of bacteriology at the University of Oxford, who supplied it. Eighty sheep were taken to the island and bombs filled with anthrax spores were detonated close to where selected groups were tethered. The sheep became infected with anthrax and began to die within days of exposure.

Some of the experiments were recorded on 16 mm colour movie film, which was declassified in 1997. One sequence shows the detonation of an anthrax bomb fixed at the end of a tall pole supported with guy ropes. After the bomb explodes, a brownish aerosol cloud drifts away towards the target animals. A later sequence shows anthrax-infected sheep carcasses being burned in incinerators at the end of the experiment. After the tests were completed, scientists concluded that a large release of anthrax spores would thoroughly pollute German cities, rendering them uninhabitable for decades afterwards. Those conclusions were supported by the inability to decontaminate the island after the experiment—the spores were sufficiently durable to resist any efforts at decontamination.

In 1945, when the island's owner sought its return, the Ministry of Supply recognised that the island was contaminated, and so could not be de-requisitioned until it was deemed safe. In 1946, the government agreed to acquire the island and to take responsibility for it. The owner or their heirs would be able to repurchase the island for at most £500 when it was declared "fit for habitation by man and beast". For many years, it was judged too hazardous and expensive to decontaminate the island sufficiently to allow public access, and Gruinard Island was quarantined indefinitely. Visits to the island were prohibited, except for periodic checks by Porton Down personnel to determine the level of contamination.

== Operation Dark Harvest ==
In 1981 newspapers began receiving messages with the heading "Operation Dark Harvest" which demanded that the government decontaminate the island, and reported that a "team of microbiologists from two universities" had landed on the island with the aid of local people and collected 300 pounds (140 kilograms) of soil.

The group threatened to leave samples of the soil "at appropriate points that will ensure the rapid loss of indifference of the government and the equally rapid education of the general public". The same day a sealed package of soil was left outside the military research facility at Porton Down; tests revealed that it contained anthrax bacilli. A few days later another sealed package of soil was left in Blackpool, where the governing Conservative Party was holding its annual conference. The soil did not contain anthrax, but officials said that the soil was similar to that found on the island.

== Decontamination ==
Starting in 1986, a determined effort was made to decontaminate Gruinard Island. 280 tonnes of formaldehyde solution diluted in sea water was sprayed over all 485 acres (196 hectares) of the island and the worst-contaminated topsoil around the dispersal site was removed. Run-off from the formaldehyde seeped into the ocean and slowly led to the destruction of intertidal organisms such as barnacles, crustaceans, and seaweed. By 2000, research into intertidal organisms recovery was launched, with researchers from that survey project in 2007 saying that "recolonization is ongoing, rather than complete."

A flock of sheep was placed on the island not long after the cleanup in 1987 and remained healthy.

On 24 April 1990, after 48 years of quarantine and four years after the solution was applied, junior defence minister Michael Neubert visited the island and announced its safety by removing the warning signs. On 1 May 1990, the island was repurchased by the heirs of the original owner for the original sale price of £500. There was some confusion in which members of the public did not know it was being resold solely to its original owners and people from around the world sent letters to the British government asking to purchase the island for £500.

== Wildfire ==
On 26 March 2022, the island was burned "from one end to the other" by a wildfire. Eyewitnesses described the scene as "apocalyptic". The cause of the wildfire has not been confirmed but around 200 hectares have been destroyed by the fire. A spokeswoman on behalf of the Gruinard estate did not explicitly state the cause of the fire, only that "It hasn't caused any damage. It has done good."

== Popular culture references ==
Gruinard Island is mentioned in the novels The Anthrax Mutation by Alan Scott (1971), The Enemy by Desmond Bagley (1977), 1982, Janine by Alasdair Gray (1984), Isvik by Hammond Innes (1991), Sea of Death by Richard P. Henrick (1992), The Fist of God by Frederick Forsyth (1994), Quantico by Greg Bear (2005), The Big Over Easy by Jasper Fforde (2005), Forbidden Island by Malcolm Rose (2009), And then you die by Iris Johansen (1998), The Island by R. J. Price (better-known as the poet Richard Price) (2010), And the Land Lay Still by James Robertson, The Impossible Dead by Ian Rankin (2011), White Pines by Gemma Amor (2020), and Paying the Piper by Sharon McCrumb. It also features as the principal setting for the novel El año de gracia by Cristina Fernández Cubas, in which the protagonist spends a winter shipwrecked on the island.

In issues 187–188 of the comic book Hellblazer, in a story titled "Bred in the Bone", the protagonist's niece finds herself on Gruinard surrounded by flesh-eating children. The issues were released in 2003 and were written by Mike Carey and illustrated by Doug Alexander Gregory.

An episode of the British wartime TV series Foyle's War entitled "Bad Blood" involved biological testing – a reference to the Gruinard testing.

The 1970 Hawaii Five-O episode "Three Dead Cows at Makapu, Part 2" featured a scientist played by Ed Flanders who threatened to unleash a deadly virus on the island of Oahu. When being interrogated, the scientist briefly mentions Gruinard Island and how it will be uninhabitable for a century due to anthrax experiments.

Outlying Islands, a Fringe First-winning play by Scottish dramatist David Greig, is a fictionalised account of two British scientists' visit to an island in Scotland where the government plans to test anthrax inspired by the story of Gruinard.

"Smallpox Island", off the north-west coast of Scotland, appears in the 2000 AD comic strip Caballistics, Inc., although the warnings of contamination from biological weapons are a cover for a top secret, high-security prison.

The 2006 Doctor Who audio drama Night Thoughts is set on the fictional Gravonax Island, the name and history of which are inspired by those of Gruinard.

The 2013 UK TV series Utopia describes the fictional outbreak of a new form of flu. During Episode 3, Dugdale visits the proposed origin of the virus at the, now quarantined, Island of Fetlar.

The experiments are referred to in the storyline of "Trust", the third and fourth episodes of Series 16 of the BBC series Silent Witness.

== See also ==
- List of islands of Scotland
