= Rawalpindi experiments =

Mustard gas experiments in Rawalpindi

The Rawalpindi experiments were experiments involving use of mustard gas carried out by British scientists from Porton Down on hundreds of soldiers from the British Indian Army. These experiments were carried out before and during the Second World War in a military installation at Rawalpindi, British India (located in what is now Pakistan). These experiments began in the early 1930s and lasted more than 10 years. Since the publication of the story in The Guardian on 1 September 2007, the experiments have been referred to as the Rawalpindi experiments or Rawalpindi mustard gas experiments in the media and elsewhere.

== History ==
The experiments in Rawalpindi were part of a much larger project intended to test the effects of chemical weapons on humans. More than 20,000 British servicemen were subjected to chemical warfare trials between 1916 and 1989 at the Defence Ministry's Porton Down research centre in southwest England. The Rawalpindi experiments focused on mustard gas, now known to be highly carcinogenic. According to documents at The National Archives in London, British scientists and doctors tested the effects of mustard gas on hundreds of Indian soldiers over a ten-year period. Beginning in the early 1930s, scientists at Rawalpindi sent British Indian Army soldiers, wearing shorts and cotton shirts, into gas chambers to experience the effects of mustard gas. The scientists hoped to determine the appropriate dosage to use on battlefields. Many of the subjects suffered severe burns from their exposure to the gas.

These tests caused large numbers of burns, some of which were so damaging that the subjects had to be hospitalized. According to the report severely burned patients were often very miserable and depressed and in considerable discomfort. The patients were treated at the Indian Military Hospital Rawalpindi (now known as the Military Hospital Rawalpindi). The exact place where the British facility equipped with gas chambers was located in Rawalpindi is unknown. Porton Down officials have argued that trials took place in a different era, during a conflict, and so their conduct should not be judged by today's standards.

== See also ==
- Keen as Mustard, a documentary film about tests in tropical Australia on serviceman volunteers during WWII.
