= RAF Barnham =

Royal Air Force station in Suffolk, England

RAF Barnham
- Part of RAF Honington
- Near Thetford, Suffolk in England
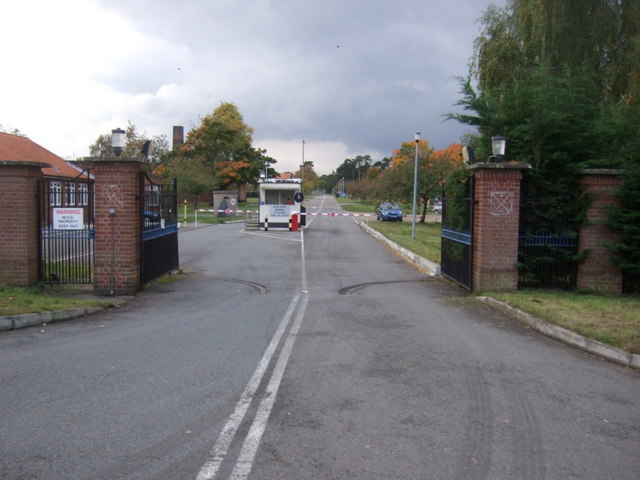
- Entrance to RAF Barnham.

Site information
- Type: Training area and domestic accommodation
- Owner: Ministry of Defence
- Operator: Royal Air Force
- Controlled by: No. 2 Group (Air Combat Support)
- Condition: Closed

Location
- Shown within Suffolk
- Coordinates: 52°23′24″N 000°44′08″E
- Area: 179 hectares (440 acres)

Site history
- In use: 1939–2026

Garrison information
- Occupants: RAF Regiment

RAF Barnham (also called MOD Barnham) is a former Royal Air Force station situated in Suffolk, England 2 miles (3.2 km) south of Thetford. It is located to the north of the village of Barnham, on Thetford Heaths.

Barnham had been used as a mustard gas store and filling station during both World Wars. It was used as a high-security storage facility for nuclear bombs from 1956–1963. This area of the site is now a scheduled monument. In 1966, the nuclear weapons storage facility was sold, and now forms the privately owned Gorse Industrial Estate. Barnham was most recently used as accommodation for gunners of the RAF Regiment based at nearby RAF Honington, prior to Barnham being closed in 2026.

== History ==
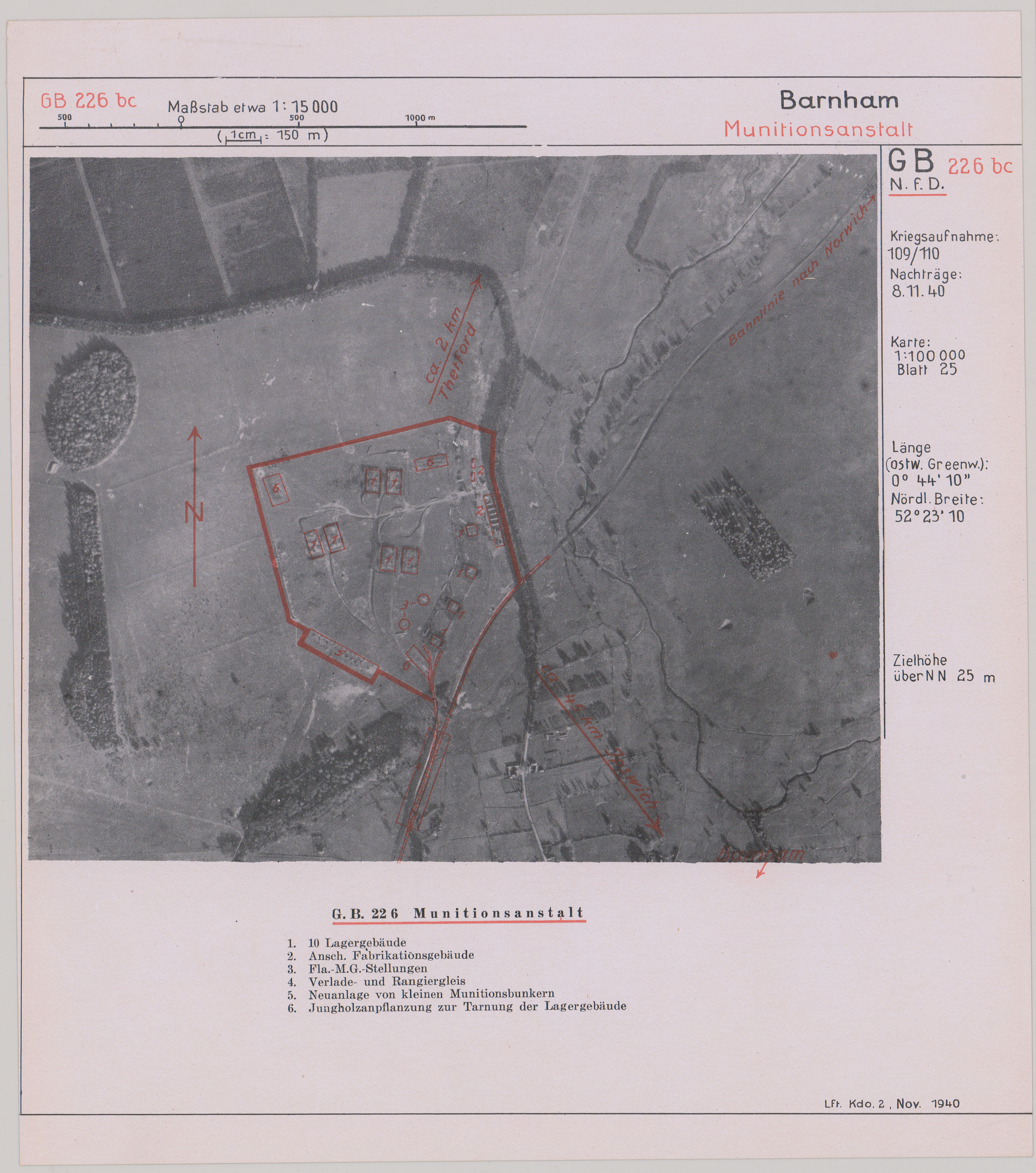
Munitions storage at RAF Barnham on a target dossier of the German Luftwaffe, 1940

Military facilities had existed at Barnham since the First World War, when tanks were tested at Little Heath and mustard gas was produced at Triangle Plantation. During the Second World War, RAF Barnham ran Forward Filling Depot 1, which took bulk deliveries of mustard gas from M. S. Factory, Valley and used it to fill bombs and shells.

During 1953 or 1954, construction began on a high-security RAF bomb store on Thetford Heath. The site was to become known as RAF Barnham and construction was completed in 1955 with the site operational from September 1956. Barnham was constructed as a sister-site to a similar facility constructed a few years before at RAF Faldingworth. Both sites were built to store and maintain free-fall nuclear bombs and Barnham was able to supply the bomber squadrons at Honington, Marham, Watton, Wyton, Upwood and Bassingbourn. Barnham came under the control of No. 94 Maintenance Unit RAF.

The operational life of Barnham was relatively short. By the early 1960s this type of storage facility became obsolete as free-fall nuclear bombs were superseded as the weapon of choice, for the British nuclear deterrent, by the Blue Steel stand-off missile. The storage and maintenance of nuclear weapons moved to the V bomber airfields. The last nuclear weapons were probably removed from the site by April 1963.

=== Nuclear weapons storage ===
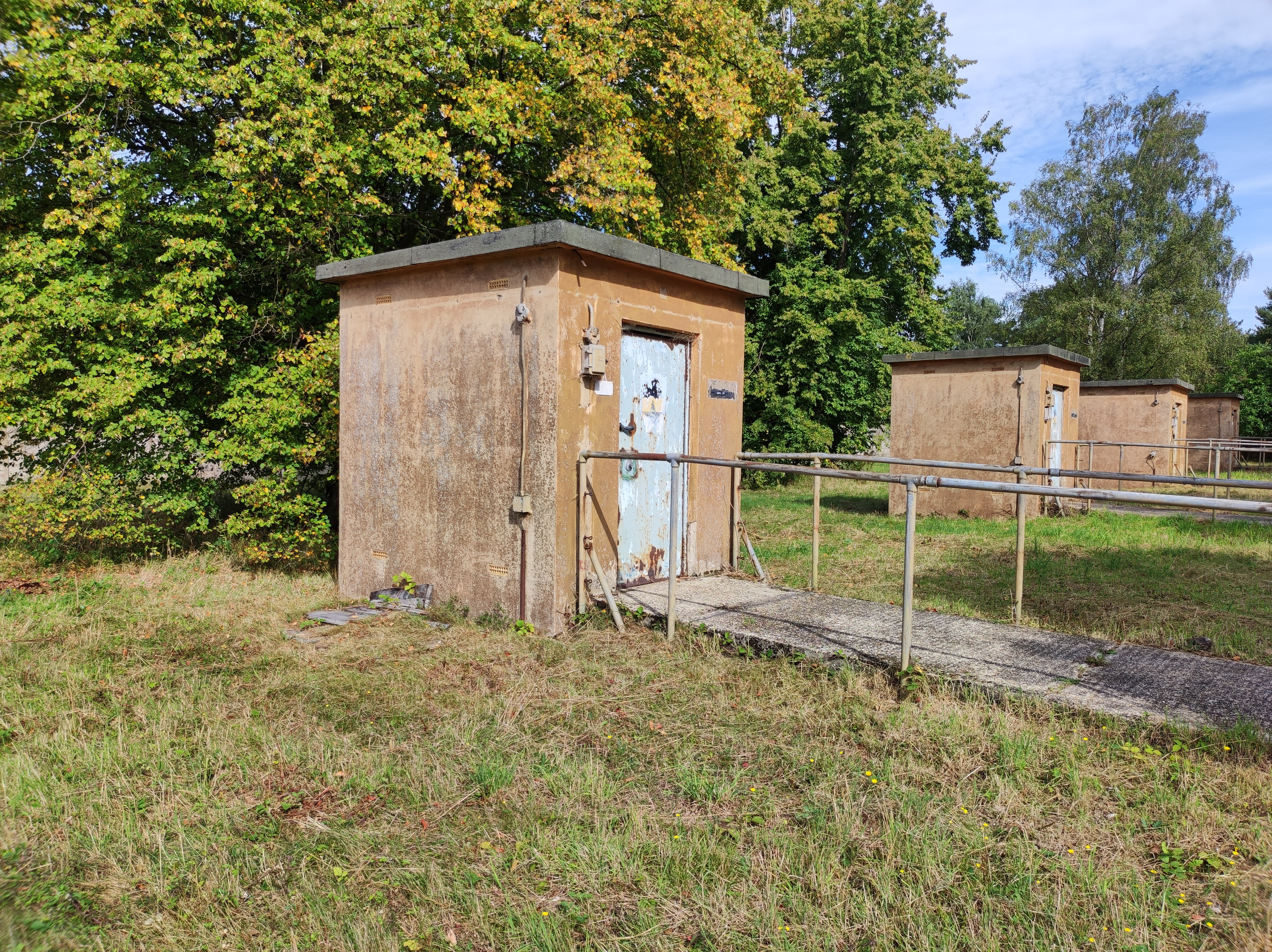
Hutches used to store the fissile core of nuclear weapons

The site was built specifically to store and maintain free-fall nuclear bombs, such as Blue Danube. This specific purpose was reflected in the facility's layout: The site was roughly pentagonal in shape. It consisted of three large non-nuclear component stores, surrounded by earthwork banking and a number of smaller storage buildings to hold the fissile cores; the cores were held in stainless steel containers sunk into the ground. The larger buildings stored the bomb casings and the high-explosive elements of the weapons.

The smaller stores (known as "Hutches") were constructed to hold the fissile core of the weapons. These hutches were further divided into type 'A' and 'B'. The 'A' type hutches having a single borehole for the storage of plutonium cores and the 'B' type hutches having a double borehole for storing cobalt cores. In total, there were 55 hutches giving enough capacity to store 64 fissile cores. Barnham had sufficient storage capacity for 132 fissile cores although it's likely that only a small number were ever stored there as only 25 Blue Danube bombs were ever built at a cost of £1M per bomb.

In addition to the storage buildings, the site consisted of a number of other buildings including a fire station, RAF Police flight, administration block, mess block, mechanical transport section, kennels and workshops. The perimeter of the site was protected by a double system of chain-link fencing and an inner concrete-panel wall; all of which were topped with barbed wire. In 1959, security was enhanced by the building of watch towers around the perimeter.

The former nuclear bomb storage facilities are designated as a scheduled monument by Historic England. Several buildings on the site have listed building status.

=== Closure ===
A Better Defence Estate, published in November 2016, stated that the Ministry of Defence would dispose of the site by 2020. Domestic accommodation would be relocated to RAF Honington, with access to Barnham Training Area maintained. This was later extended to 2022, and once more to 2027. By November 2026, the Home Office confirmed the site is no longer in active use by the Ministry of Defence.

Prior to closure, RAF Barnham was a satellite station of RAF Honington and was used by the RAF Regiment for accommodation and as a training venue for the Potential Gunners Acquaintance Course (PGAC).

=== Barnham Training Area ===
Barnham Training Area is owned by the Ministry of Defence and serves as the backdoor training area for RAF Honington and formerly RAF Barnham. It has been used by the RAF Regiment Training Wing, the RAF Force Protection Centre, regular and auxiliary RAF Regiment field squadrons, air defence squadrons and cadets.

== Proposed use as asylum accommodation ==
In June 2026, the Home Office announced that MOD Barnham was one of three former military sites being considered for use as asylum seeker accommodation, alongside MOD Bicester and MOD Linton-on-Ouse.

The Home Office stated that, if the proposal proceeded, MOD Barnham would provide accommodation exclusively for single, adult, male asylum applicants aged between 18 and 65. Residents would not be detained and would be permitted to leave the site. The proposed accommodation would operate for a minimum of ten years.

The Home Office subsequently submitted an Urgent Crown Development application to the Ministry of Housing, Communities and Local Government. It stated that submission of the application did not constitute a final decision and that the proposal remained subject to planning, feasibility work and other assessments. The proposal was opposed by local authorities. Suffolk County Council stated that it had been informed that the site could accommodate approximately 1,250 men. On 1 July 2026, West Suffolk Council unanimously agreed a motion stating that RAF Barnham was unsuitable for the proposed use, citing its rural location, limited infrastructure and transport links, and the possible effect on local services and surrounding communities. West Suffolk Council also raised potential environmental constraints associated with the site's relationship to the Breckland Special Protection Area and Special Area of Conservation, including habitat protections relating to the stone-curlew. The council argued that any development would require assessment under the Conservation of Habitats and Species Regulations 2017.

In October 2026, in protest at the government's proposal, a local residents' group decided to hold a symbolic referendum on leaving the UK. The villagers of Barnham overwhelmingly voted to leave the UK in November 2026, with 257 votes cast in favour, and 16 votes against.

== See also ==
- List of Royal Air Force stations
- Nuclear weapons of the United Kingdom
