= Operation Antler (Porton Down investigation) =

Operation Antler was a 1999 police investigation into experiments conducted on humans at the British government's Porton Down research establishment between 1939 and 1989. Several cases were sent to the Crown Prosecution Service but none proceeded to criminal prosecutions.

In July 1999, the Wiltshire Constabulary opened an investigation into allegations by a former serviceman of malfeasance at Porton Down Chemical and Biological Research Establishment. As a consequence of these preliminary investigations, the scope of the inquiry was broadened into a major inquiry named Operation Antler.

The inquiries established that a number of the participants in the Service Volunteer Programme claimed to have been tricked into taking part in experiments. Some also claimed to have suffered long-term illness or injury as a result of the experiments.

The investigation covered the period from 1939 to 1989 and lasted for five years. Its thirteen members interviewed over 700 ex-servicemen or their relatives. The British Government provided the constabulary with an additional £870,000 towards the costs.

At least 20,000 servicemen participated as volunteers in testing at Porton Down, and records survive from 1942 onwards. The Second World War was the peak period for testing, and much of this concerned mustard gas, with as many as 8,000 volunteers being exposed. After 1945, testing shifted to nerve agents, and used around 3,400 volunteers (although they may not all have been exposed). In the 1960s, smaller scale experiments took place with non-lethal agents such as LSD and glycollates, and later testing focused on countermeasures such as pyridostigmine bromide which is a pre-treatment for nerve agents.

The constabulary developed 25 cases for possible prosecution, of which eight were forwarded to the Crown Prosecution Service. Subsequently, the CPS decided that there would be no prosecutions of scientists involved in the tests. The CPS decision was reviewed following the verdict of unlawful killing at the inquest in November 2004 into the death on 6 May 1953 of volunteer Ronald Maddison. In June 2006, the CPS confirmed that there would be no prosecutions.
