= Cyclosarin =

Chemical compound (nerve agent)

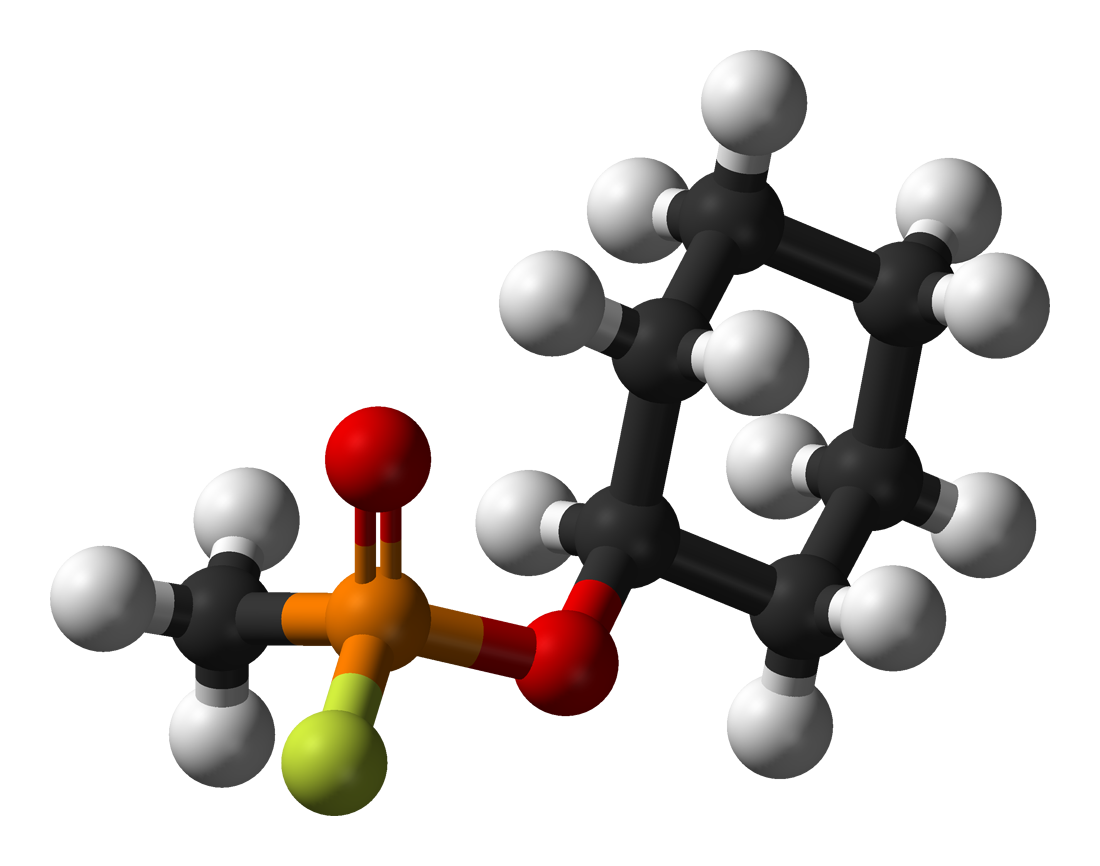

Names
- Preferred IUPAC name Cyclohexyl methylphosphonofluoridate
- Other names GF;(Fluoro-methyl-phosphoryl)oxycyclohexane

Identifiers
CAS Number	329-99-7
3D model (JSmol)	Interactive image
ChemSpider	58069
PubChem CID	64505
UNII	VM36F9N236
UN number	2810
CompTox Dashboard (EPA)	DTXSID00861875
- InChI: InChI=1S/C7H14FO2P/c1-11(8,9)10-7-5-3-2-4-6-7/h7H,2-6H2,1H3 Key: SNTRKUOVAPUGAY-UHFFFAOYSA-N; InChI=1/C7H14FO2P/c1-11(8,9)10-7-5-3-2-4-6-7/h7H,2-6H2,1H3 Key: SNTRKUOVAPUGAY-UHFFFAOYAC
- SMILES: O=P(F)(OC1CCCCC1)C

Properties
Chemical formula	C_{7}H_{14}FO_{2}P
Molar mass	180.159 g·mol^{−1}
Appearance	Colorless liquid
Density	1.1278 g/cm^{3}
Melting point	−30 °C (−22 °F; 243 K)
Boiling point	239 °C (462 °F; 512 K)
Solubility in water	Almost insoluble

Hazards
Flash point	94 °C (201 °F; 367 K)
- Except where otherwise noted, data are given for materials in their standard state (at 25 °C [77 °F], 100 kPa). verify (what is ?) Infobox references

Cyclosarin or GF (cyclohexyl methylphosphonofluoridate) is an extremely toxic substance used as a chemical weapon. It is a member of the G-series family of nerve agents, a group of chemical weapons discovered and synthesized by a German team led by Gerhard Schrader. The major nerve gases are the G agents, sarin (GB), soman (GD), tabun (GA), and the V agents such as VX. The original agent, tabun, was discovered in Germany in 1936 in the process of work on organophosphorus insecticides. Next came sarin, soman and finally, cyclosarin, a product of commercial insecticide laboratories prior to World War II.

As a chemical weapon, it is classified as a weapon of mass destruction by the United Nations. Pursuant to UN Resolution 687 its production and stockpiling was outlawed globally by the Chemical Weapons Convention (CWC) of 1993, although Egypt, Israel, North Korea and South Sudan have not ratified the CWC (thus not outlawing their own stockpiling of chemical weapons).

== Chemical characteristics ==
Like its predecessor sarin, cyclosarin is a liquid organophosphate nerve agent. Its physical characteristics are, however, quite different from those of sarin.

At room temperature, cyclosarin is a colorless liquid whose odor has been variously described as sweet and musty, or resembling peaches or shellac. Unlike sarin, cyclosarin is a persistent liquid, meaning that it has a low vapor pressure and therefore evaporates relatively slowly, at only about 1/69th the rate of sarin and 1/20th that of water.

Also unlike sarin, cyclosarin is flammable, with a flash point of 94 °C (201 °F).

== History ==
First synthesized during World War II as part of Nazi Germany's chemical weapons research on organophosphate compounds after their military potential was recognized, cyclosarin was also studied later in the United States and Great Britain in the early 1950s as part of a systematic study of potential nerve agents. It was never selected for mass production, however, due to its precursors being more expensive than those of other G-series nerve agents such as sarin (GB).

To date, Iraq is the only nation known to have manufactured significant quantities of cyclosarin for use as a chemical agent and to deploy it in battle. During the Iran–Iraq War (1980–1988), the Iraqis used sarin and cyclosarin together as a mixture. This was likely done to obtain a more persistent chemical agent as well as in response to an existing embargo placed on alcohol precursors for sarin.

== Munitions ==
=== Binary weapons ===
Like other nerve agents, cyclosarin can be shipped in binary munitions.

A cyclosarin binary weapon would most likely contain methylphosphonyl difluoride in one capsule, with the other capsule containing a mixture of cyclohexylamine and cyclohexanol.

=== GB-GF mixtures ===
Iraq fielded munitions filled with a mixture of GB (sarin) and GF (cyclosarin). Tests on mice indicated that GB-GF mixtures have a relative toxicity between GF and GB.
