= C7H16FO2P =

The molecular formula C_{7}H_{16}FO_{2}P (molar mass: 182.17 g/mol, exact mass: 182.0872 u) may refer to:

- GH (also known as EA-1211)
- Soman, or GD
