= Chlorosarin =

Chemical compound

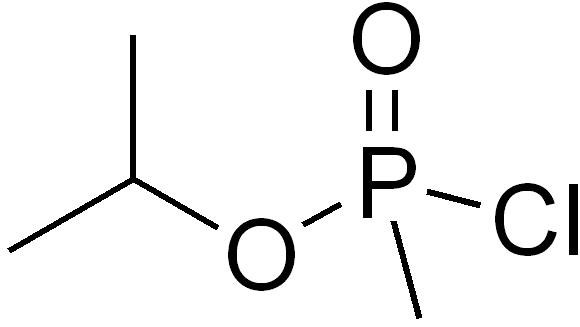

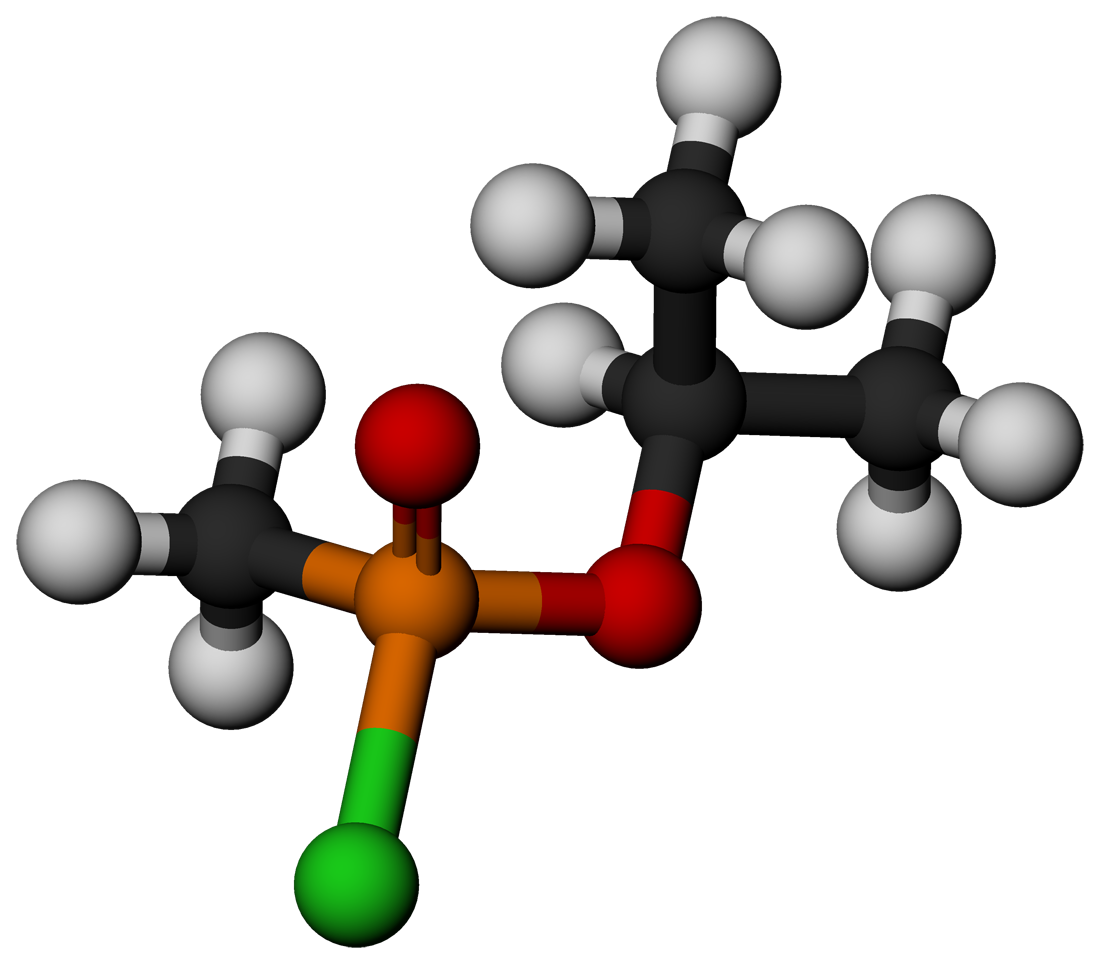

Names
- Preferred IUPAC name Propan-2-yl methylphosphonochloridate
- Other names O-Isopropyl methylphosphonochloridate Isopropyl methylphosphonic chloride

Identifiers
CAS Number	1445-76-7
3D model (JSmol)	Interactive image
ChemSpider	92259
PubChem CID	102124
UNII	0DNX22ZOWK
CompTox Dashboard (EPA)	DTXSID40862669
- InChI: InChI=1S/C4H10ClO2P/c1-4(2)7-8(3,5)6/h4H,1-3H3 Key: RHAHLPAWJVKXAZ-UHFFFAOYSA-N; InChI=1/C4H10ClO2P/c1-4(2)7-8(3,5)6/h4H,1-3H3 Key: RHAHLPAWJVKXAZ-UHFFFAOYAW
- SMILES: ClP(=O)(OC(C)C)C

Properties
Chemical formula	C_{4}H_{10}ClO_{2}P
Molar mass	156.55 g·mol^{−1}
- Except where otherwise noted, data are given for materials in their standard state (at 25 °C [77 °F], 100 kPa). verify (what is ?) Infobox references

Chlorosarin is a chemical precursor used in the final step of one method for the production of the nerve agent sarin. Also known as O-isopropyl methylphosphonochloridate and isopropyl methylphosphonic chloride, it has a molecular weight of 156.55 g/mol and a molecular formula of C_{4}H_{10}ClO_{2}P.

== Safety ==
Chlorosarin will produce effects similar to those of sarin if it is absorbed into body, but they are less severe. However, like sarin, it is highly toxic and small doses of it would be lethal. The Chemical Weapons Convention also lists chlorosarin as well as other chemicals such chlorosoman and QL as controlled substances in Schedule 1.

== Synthesis ==
Like GB, ClGB presents a varied preparation route. Overall, it is a lower cost chemical warfare agent than sarin. ClGB was one of the final intermediates of step five of the DMHP process, being known as a raw impurity and as a final precursor.

Chlorosarin can be synthesized from diisopropyl methylphosphonate (DIMP) and phosgene.
