= Ethylsarin =

Nerve agent

Names
- Preferred IUPAC name Propan-2-yl ethylphosphonofluoridate
- Other names GE, EA-1209, TL-1620, T-2109

Identifiers
CAS Number	1189-87-3
3D model (JSmol)	Interactive image
ChemSpider	59009
PubChem CID	65566
UNII	Y38A9Z75SV
CompTox Dashboard (EPA)	DTXSID60862585
- InChI: InChI=1S/C5H12FO2P/c1-4-9(6,7)8-5(2)3/h5H,4H2,1-3H3 Key: KXKAXOZWSFAJTG-UHFFFAOYSA-N
- SMILES: CCP(=O)(OC(C)C)F

Properties
Chemical formula	C_{5}H_{12}FO_{2}P
Molar mass	154.121 g·mol^{−1}
Boiling point	170 °C (338 °F; 443 K)
Vapor pressure	1.97 mmHg

Hazards
- Occupational safety and health (OHS/OSH)
Main hazards	Extremely toxic
Flash point	56.7 °C (134.1 °F; 329.8 K)
- Lethal dose or concentration (LD, LC)
LD_{50} (median dose)	690 mg/kg (mice, intraperitoneal)
- Except where otherwise noted, data are given for materials in their standard state (at 25 °C [77 °F], 100 kPa). Infobox references

Ethylsarin (GE), also known as EA-1209, TL-1620 or T-2109, is an organophosphate nerve agent of the G-series. It is the ethylphosphonofluoridate analog of sarin.
