= Chlorosoman =

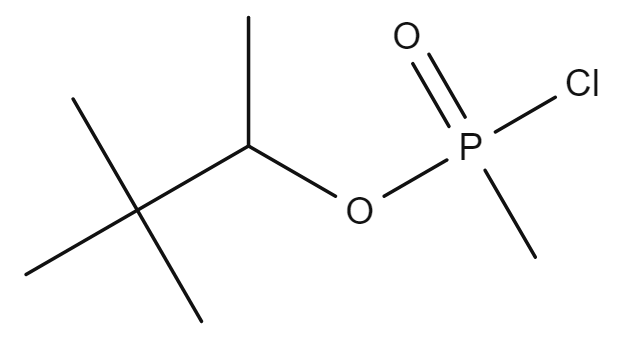

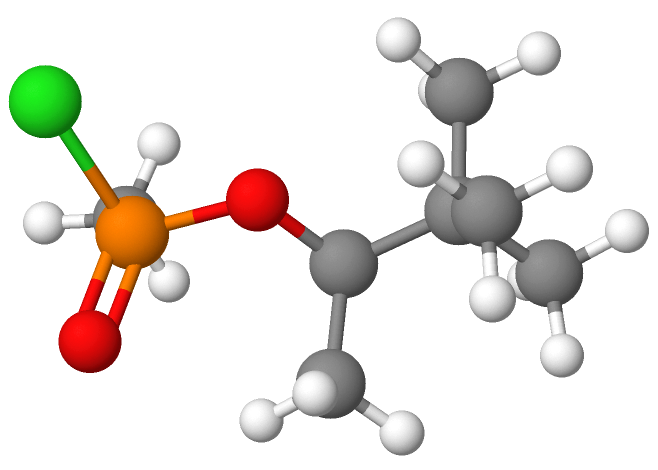

Names
- Preferred IUPAC name 3,3-Dimethylbutan-2-yl methylphosphonochloridate
- Other names Pinacolyl methylphosphonochloridate

Identifiers
CAS Number	7040-57-5
3D model (JSmol)	Interactive image
ChemSpider	128777
PubChem CID	145983
CompTox Dashboard (EPA)	DTXSID80863993
- InChI: InChI=1S/C7H16ClO2P/c1-6(7(2,3)4)10-11(5,8)9/h6H,1-5H3 Key: XVNBZVNXJMOQEX-UHFFFAOYSA-N
- SMILES: CC(C(C)(C)C)OP(=O)(C)Cl

Properties
Chemical formula	C_{7}H_{16}ClO_{2}P
Molar mass	198.63 g·mol^{−1}
Solubility in water	1,030 mg/L
Vapor pressure	0.207 mm Hg
- Except where otherwise noted, data are given for materials in their standard state (at 25 °C [77 °F], 100 kPa). Infobox references

Chlorosoman is a chlorine analog of soman. It is a highly toxic organophosphorus compound and is used as the precursor substance for soman nerve agent. Its physical properties are estimated. Soman is insoluble in water, with a boiling point of 223 °C and a melting point of -27 °C. Chlorosoman is at least 2.5 times less toxic than soman.

The chlorosoman (ClG) series of compounds is used more as a precursor to highly toxic compounds. For example, soman is a precursor to EA-2613 and EA-3209.

== Synthesis ==
ClG follows the same synthetic route as soman, with fluoridation being omitted. Chlorosoman is prepared by the Finkelstein reaction between a solution of sodium chloride in DMF and soman. A fluoride substitution is hypothetically made by the metathetic reaction between soman, anhydrous aluminum chloride, and sodium chloride in a suitable solvent, precipitating sodium hexafluoroaluminate.

6 CH_{3}P(O)FOCH_{3}CHC(CH_{3})_{3} + AlCl_{3} + 3 NaCl → 6 CH_{3}P(O)ClOCH_{3}CHC(CH_{3})_{3} + Na_{3}AlF_{6}↓
