= Alpha-D-ribose 1-methylphosphonate 5-triphosphate synthase =

Class of enzymes

Identifiers
- EC no.: 2.7.8.37

Databases
- IntEnz: IntEnz view
- BRENDA: BRENDA entry
- ExPASy: NiceZyme view
- KEGG: KEGG entry
- MetaCyc: metabolic pathway
- PRIAM: profile
- PDB structures: RCSB PDB PDBe PDBsum
Search
- PMC: articles
- PubMed: articles
- NCBI: proteins

Alpha-D-ribose 1-methylphosphonate 5-triphosphate synthase (EC 2.7.8.37) is an enzyme with systematic name ATP:methylphosphonate 5-triphosphoribosyltransferase. It catalyses the following chemical reaction:

methylphosphonic acid
ATP
α-D-ribose 1-methylphosphonate 5-triphosphate
+
adenine

ATP + methylphosphonate $\rightleftharpoons$ alpha-D-ribose 1-methylphosphonate 5-triphosphate + adenine

This enzyme characterised from the bacterium Escherichia coli produces α-D-ribose 1-methylphosphonate 5-triphosphate by reacting methylphosphonic acid with adenosine triphosphate (ATP), which gives adenine as a byproduct. This is part of a pathway that allows microorganisms to metabolise carbon-phosphorus bonds.
