= Soman =

Chemical compound (nerve agent)

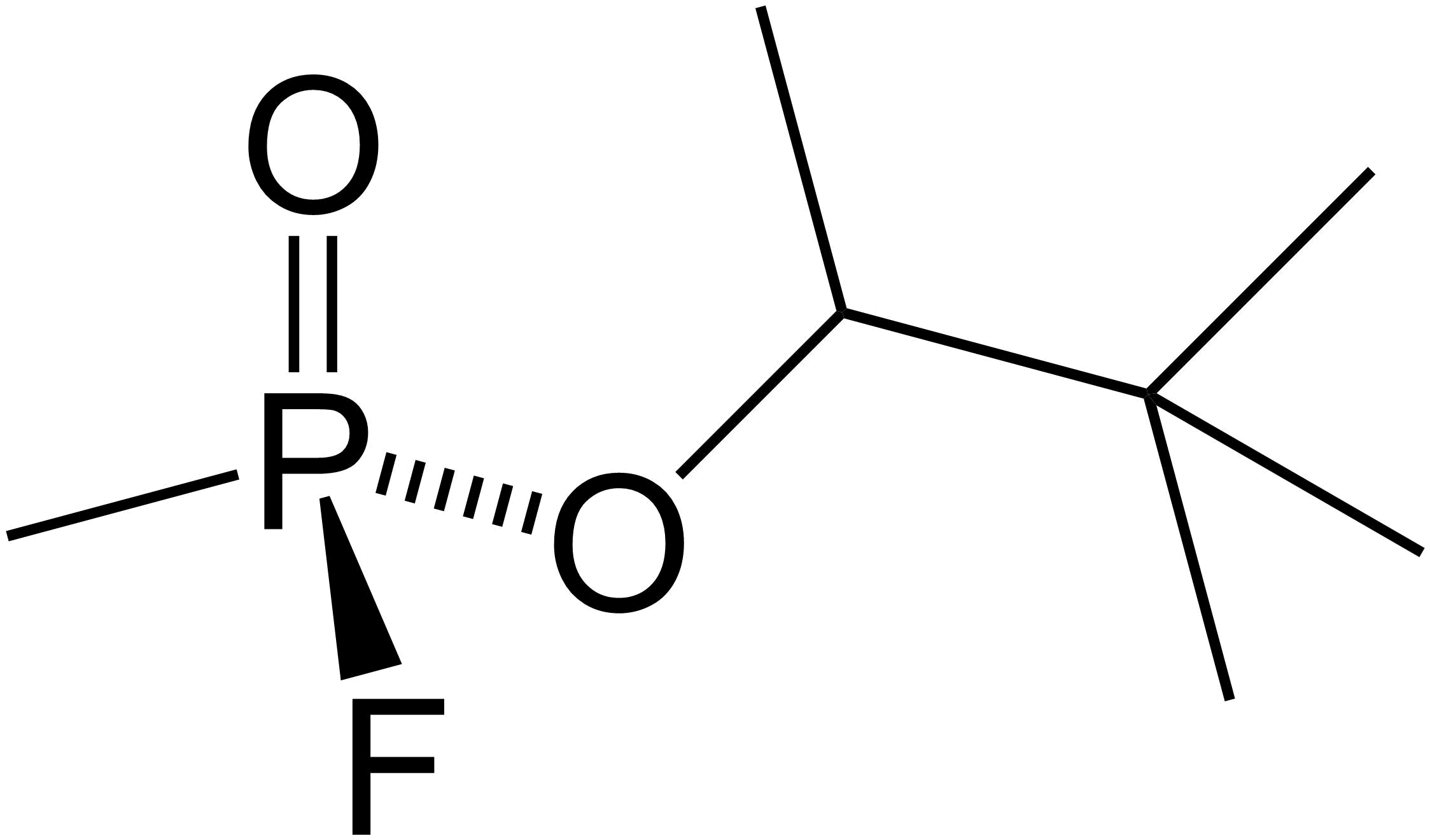

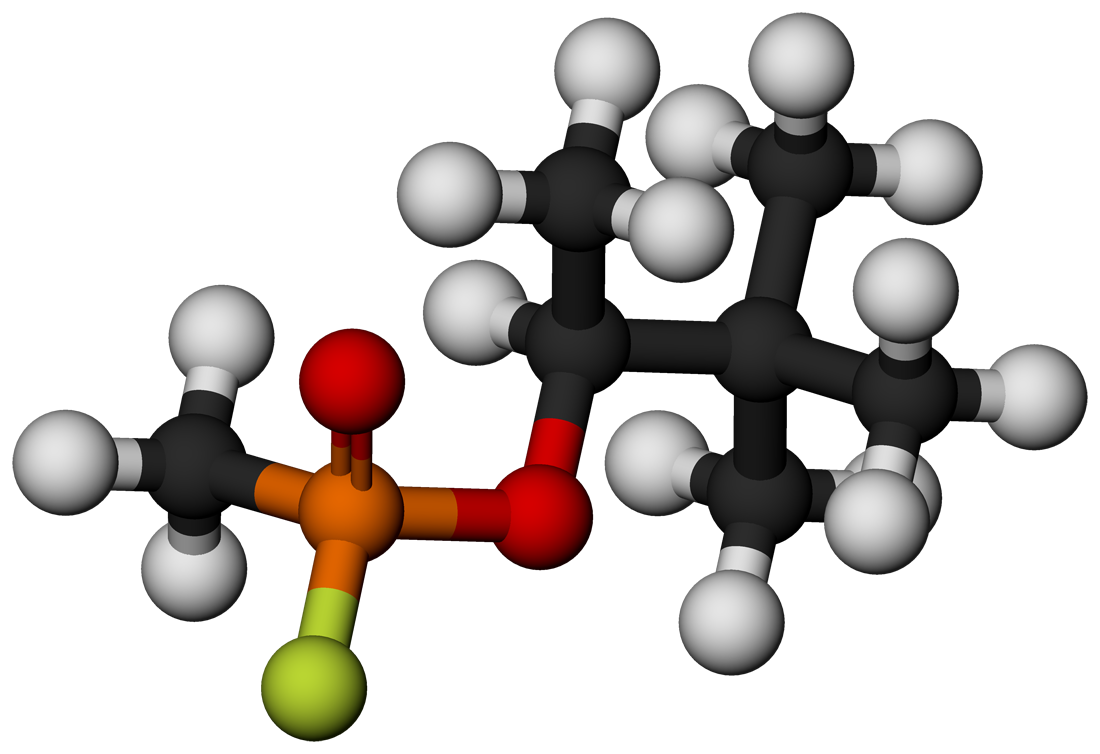

Names
- Preferred IUPAC name 3,3-Dimethylbutan-2-yl methylphosphonofluoridate
- Other names GD; Phosphonofluoridic acid, methyl-, 1, 2, 2-trimethylpropyl ester; 2-(Fluoromethylphosphoryl)oxy-3,3-dimethylbutane; Pinacolyl methylphosphonofluoridate; 1,2,2-Trimethylpropyl methylphosphonofluoridate; Methylpinacolyloxyfluorophosphine oxide; Pinacolyloxymethylphosphonyl fluoride; Pinacolyl methanefluorophosphonate; Methylfluoropinacolylphosphonate; Fluoromethylpinacolyloxyphosphine oxide; Methylpinacolyloxyphosphonyl fluoride; Pinacolyl methylfluorophosphonate; 1,2,2-Trimethylpropoxyfluoromethylphosphine oxide

Identifiers
CAS Number	96-64-0
3D model (JSmol)	Interactive image
ChEMBL	ChEMBL15910
ChemSpider	7032
PubChem CID	7305
UNII	3OF3WXB67Q
CompTox Dashboard (EPA)	DTXSID2031906
- InChI: InChI=1S/C7H16FO2P/c1-6(7(2,3)4)10-11(5,8)9/h6H,1-5H3 Key: GRXKLBBBQUKJJZ-UHFFFAOYSA-N; InChI=1/C7H16FO2P/c1-6(7(2,3)4)10-11(5,8)9/h6H,1-5H3 Key: GRXKLBBBQUKJJZ-UHFFFAOYAY
- SMILES: FP(=O)(C)OC(C)C(C)(C)C

Properties
Chemical formula	C_{7}H_{16}FO_{2}P
Molar mass	182.175 g·mol^{−1}
Appearance	When pure, colorless liquid with odor resembling rotten fruit. With impurities, amber or dark brown, with odor of camphor oil.
Density	1.022 g/cm^{3}
Melting point	−42 °C (−44 °F; 231 K)
Boiling point	198 °C (388 °F; 471 K)
Solubility in water	Moderate
Vapor pressure	0.40 mmHg (53 Pa)

Hazards
- Occupational safety and health (OHS/OSH)
Main hazards	Extremely toxic, biohazard
NFPA 704 (fire diamond)	4 1 1
- Except where otherwise noted, data are given for materials in their standard state (at 25 °C [77 °F], 100 kPa). verify (what is ?) Infobox references

Soman (or GD, EA 1210, Zoman, PFMP, A-255, systematic name: O-pinacolyl methylphosphonofluoridate) is an extremely toxic chemical substance. It is a nerve agent, interfering with normal functioning of the mammalian nervous system by inhibiting the enzyme cholinesterase. It is an inhibitor of both acetylcholinesterase and butyrylcholinesterase. As a chemical weapon, it is classified as a weapon of mass destruction by the United Nations according to UN Resolution 687. Its production is strictly controlled, and stockpiling is outlawed by the Chemical Weapons Convention of 1993 where it is classified as a Schedule 1 substance. Soman was the third of the so-called G-series nerve agents to be discovered along with GA (tabun), GB (sarin), and GF (cyclosarin).

When pure, soman is a volatile, corrosive, and colorless liquid with a faint odor like that of mothballs or rotten fruit. More commonly, it is a yellow to brown color and has a strong odor described as similar to camphor. The LCt_{50} for soman is 70 mg·min/m^{3} in humans.

GD can be thickened for use as a chemical spray using an acryloid copolymer. It can also be deployed as a binary chemical weapon; its precursor chemicals are methylphosphonyl difluoride and a mixture of pinacolyl alcohol and an amine.

== History ==
After World War I, during which mustard gas and phosgene were used as chemical warfare agents, the 1925 Geneva Protocol was signed in an attempt to ban chemical warfare. Nevertheless, research into chemical warfare agents and the use of them continued. In 1936 a new, more dangerous chemical agent was discovered when Gerhard Schrader of IG Farben in Germany isolated tabun (named GA for German Agent A by the United States), the first nerve agent, while developing new insecticides. This discovery was followed by the isolation of sarin (designated GB by the United States) in 1938, also discovered by Schrader.

During World War II, research into nerve agents continued in the United States and Germany. In summer 1944, soman, a colorless liquid with a camphor odor (designated GD by the United States), was developed by the Germans. Soman proved to be even more toxic than tabun and sarin. Nobel Laureate Richard Kuhn together with Konrad Henkel discovered soman during research into the pharmacology of tabun and sarin at the Kaiser Wilhelm Institute for Medical Research at Heidelberg. This research was commissioned by the German Army. Soman was produced in small quantities at a pilot plant at the IG Farben factory in Ludwigshafen. It was never used in World War II.

Producing or stockpiling soman was banned by the 1993 Chemical Weapons Convention. When the convention entered force, the parties declared worldwide stockpiles of 9,057 tonnes of soman. The stockpiles were destroyed by 2018.

The crystal structure of soman complexed with acetylcholinesterase was determined by Millard et al. in 1999 by X-ray crystallography: 1som. Other solved acetylcholinesterase structures with soman bound to them include 2wfz, 2wg0 and 2wg1.

== Structure and reactivity ==
The stereoisomers of soman.

Soman (C(±)P(±)-soman) has four stereoisomers, each with a different toxicity, though largely similar. The stereoisomers are C(+)P(+)-soman, C(+)P(−)-soman C(−)P(−)-soman and C(−)P(+)-soman.

Soman has a phosphonyl group with a fluoride and a (large) hydrocarbon covalently bound to it. The structure is thus similar to that of sarin, which has only a smaller hydrocarbon group attached (isopropyl). Because of the similarity between the chemical structures, the reactivity of the two compounds is almost the same. Soman and sarin will both react using the phospho oxygen group, which can bind to amino acids like serine.

== Synthesis ==
The manufacture of soman is very similar to the manufacture of sarin. The difference is that the isopropanol from the sarin processes is replaced with pinacolyl alcohol:

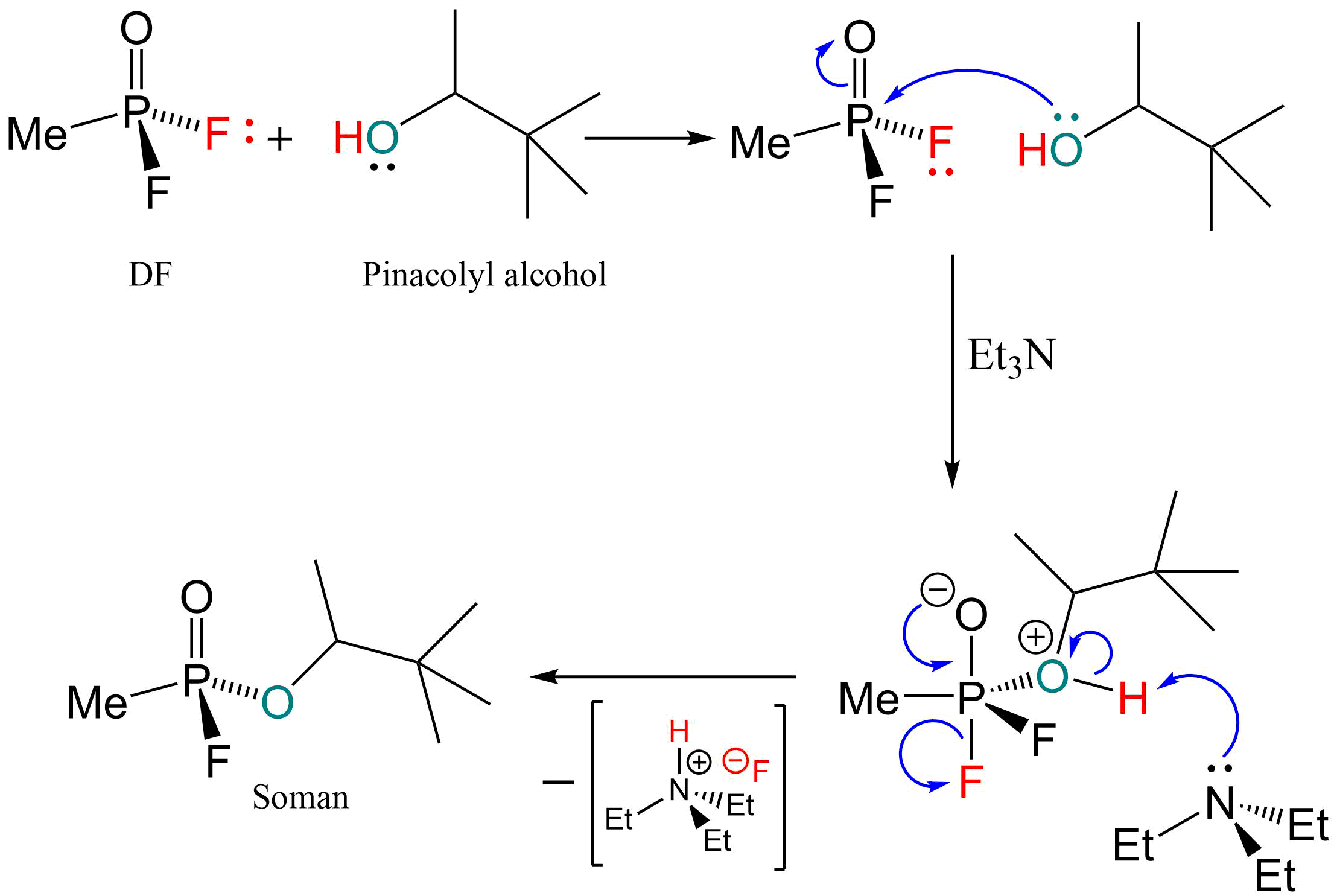
The synthesis of agent GD

Soman is synthesized by reacting pinacolyl alcohol with methylphosphonyl difluoride. The result of this reaction is the forming of soman which is described as “colorless liquid with a somewhat fruity odor.” The low vapor pressure of soman will also produce the volatile gas form of soman. Also, the acid hydrogen fluoride will form due to the elimination of fluoride and a proton. This acid is indirectly dangerous to humans. Skin contact with hydrogen fluoride will cause an immediate reaction with water which produces hydrofluoric acid.

== Mechanisms of action ==
Soman is an organophosphorus nerve agent with a mechanism of action similar to tabun. Nerve agents inhibit acetylcholine esterase (AChE) by forming an adduct with the enzyme via a serine residue on that enzyme. These adducts may be decomposed hydrolytically or, for example, by the action of some oximes and thereby regenerate the enzyme. A second reaction type, one in which the enzyme–organophosphate (OP) complex undergoes a subsequent reaction, is usually described as "aging". Once the enzyme–OP complex has aged it is no longer regenerated by the common, oxime reactivators. The rate of this process is dependent on the OP. Soman is an OP that stimulates the rate of aging most rapidly decreasing the half-life to approximately 2-6 minutes.

The only recommended oxime to prevent aging of Soman is Asoxime chloride, more commonly called HI-6. HI-6 only leads to partial reactivation of acetylcholinesterase, and this relies on immediate pre-hospital autoinjector administration.

AChE is an enzyme involved with neurotransmission. Because of the severe decrease of the half-life of this enzyme, neurotransmission is abolished in a matter of minutes.

== Metabolism ==
Once taken up in the human body, soman not only inhibits AChE, but it is also a substrate for other esterases. Reaction of soman with these esterases allows for the detoxication of the compound. No metabolic toxification reactions are known for soman.

Soman can be hydrolyzed by a so-called aryldialkylphosphatase (A-esterase), more specifically a diisopropylfluorophosphatase. This esterase, also called somanase, reacts with the anhydride bond between phosphorus and fluorine and accounts for the hydrolysis of the fluoride. Somanase also hydrolyses the methyl group of soman resulting in the formation of pinacolyl methylphosphonic acid (PMPA), which is a less potent AChE inhibitor.

Soman can also bind to other esterases, e.g., AChE, cholinesterase (ChE) and carboxylesterases (CarbE). In this binding, soman loses its fluoride. After binding to AChE or ChE soman also loses its phosphoryl group, leading to the formation of methylphosphonic acid (MPA). Binding to CarbE reduce the total concentration of soman in the blood, thus resulting in a lower toxicity. Furthermore, CarbE are involved in the detoxication by hydrolysing soman to PMPA. So CarbE account for the detoxication of soman in two ways.

The importance of the detoxication of soman after exposure was illustrated in experiments of Fonnum and Sterri (1981). They reported that only 5% of LD50 inhibited AChE in rats, resulting in acute toxic effects. This shows that metabolic reactions accounted for the detoxification of the remaining 95% of the dose.

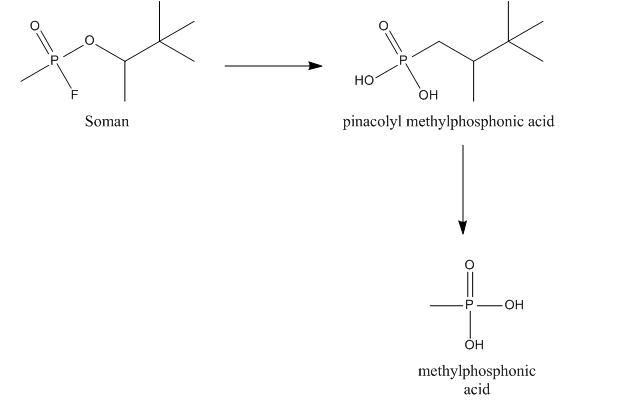
The metabolism of soman.

== Signs and symptoms ==
As soman is closely related to compounds such as sarin, indications for a soman poisoning are relatively similar. One of the first observable signs of a soman poisoning is miosis. Some, but not all of the later indications are vomiting, extreme muscle pain and peripheral nervous system problems. Those symptoms show as soon as 10 minutes after exposure and may last for many days.

In addition to the direct toxic effects on the nervous system, people exposed to soman may experience long-term effects, most of which are psychological. Subjects who were exposed to a small dose of soman suffered severe toxic effects; once treated, the subjects often developed depression, had antisocial thoughts, were withdrawn and subdued, slept restlessly and had bad dreams. These symptoms lasted six months after exposure but disappeared without lasting damage.

== Toxicity and efficacy ==
The LC_{50} of soman in air is estimated to be 70 mg min per m^{3}. Compared with the LC_{50} value for a rat, the human lethal concentration is much lower (954.3 mg min/m^{3} versus 70 mg min/m^{3}). For compounds such as soman, which may also be used as a weapon, often a fraction of the LC_{50} dose is where the first effects appear. Miosis is one of the first symptoms of soman intoxication and can be seen in doses of less than 1% of the LC_{50}.

== Effects on animals ==
Experiments have been done in which rats were exposed to soman to test if behavioral effects could be seen at low doses without generating overt symptoms. Exposure of the rats to soman in a dose of less than 3 percent of the LD_{50} caused alterations of the behavior. The active avoidance of the exposed rats was less than the avoidance of non-exposed rats (two-way shuttlebox experiment). Also the motor coordination (hurdle-stepping task), open field behavior and active as well as passive avoidance behavior were affected. One can conclude that rats that are exposed to soman performed with less success in tasks that require motor activity as well as the function of higher structures of the central nervous system (CNS) on the same time. In this, soman has a predominantly central effect.

The knowledge of the effects of low doses of soman and other choline esterase inhibitors on rats could possibly be used to explain the relatively high incidence of airplane accidents due to errors of agricultural pilots. If this knowledge could be applied to humans, one could explain this high incidence with depressed choline esterase activity due to exposure to pesticides. It is not known whether the extrapolation from rats to humans can be made.
