= GH (nerve agent) =

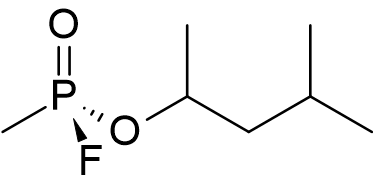

Names
- IUPAC name 4-Methyl-2-pentanyl methylphosphonofluoridate
- Other names EA-1211 1,3-Dimethylbutyl methylphosphonofluoridate

Identifiers
CAS Number	352-53-4
3D model (JSmol)	Interactive image
ChemSpider	493182
PubChem CID	567289
CompTox Dashboard (EPA)	DTXSID701188204
- InChI: InChI=1S/C7H16FO2P/c1-6(2)5-7(3)10-11(4,8)9/h6-7H,5H2,1-4H3 Key: LIGOYZROSKEIPK-UHFFFAOYSA-N
- SMILES: CC(C)CC(C)OP(=O)(C)F

Properties
Chemical formula	C_{7}H_{16}FO_{2}P
Molar mass	182.175 g·mol^{−1}
- Except where otherwise noted, data are given for materials in their standard state (at 25 °C [77 °F], 100 kPa). Infobox references

GH, also known a EA-1211, is an organophosphate nerve agent of the G-series. It is a structural isomer of soman.

== History ==
Agent GH was first investigated during World War II by Nazi Germany, where it was deemed "not as good as sarin" and subsequently discarded. Investigations continued by the chemical corps of the American and British armies.
