= Binary liquid =

Type of chemical combination

Binary liquid is a type of chemical combination, which creates a special reaction or feature as a result of mixing two liquid chemicals, that are normally inert or have no function by themselves. A number of chemical products are produced as a result of mixing two chemicals as a binary liquid, such as plastic foams and some explosives.

== See also ==
- Binary chemical weapon
- Thermophoresis
- Percus–Yevick equation
