= Gerhard Schrader =

German chemist (1903–1990)

Gerhard Schrader (25 February 1903 – 10 April 1990) was a German chemist specializing in the discovery of new insecticides, hoping to make progress in the fight against hunger in the world. Schrader is best known for his inadvertent discovery of nerve agents including sarin and tabun. Sarin is partially named after him: It was named in honor of its discoverers, Schrader, Otto Ambros, Gerhard Ritter, and Hans-Jürgen von der Linde.

Schrader was born in Bortfeld, near Wendeburg, Germany. He attended gymnasium in Braunschweig and later studied chemistry at Braunschweig University of Technology. He was later employed at the Bayer AG division of IG Farben.

From 1926 onwards, Schrader was in the employment of the large German industrial conglomerate IG Farben in the discovery of new inseciticides, focusing his efforts on the organophosphates, a class of compounds that interact with acetylcholine esterases present in nerve cells and thus inhibit nerve impulse transfer in animals, leading to death in very low doses because of their extreme toxicity. In the process, Schrader discovered several very effective insecticides, including bladan (the first fully synthetic contact insecticide based on hexaethyl tetraphosphate), and parathion (E 605), but also several compounds that were employed as nerve agents (the first of which was Tabun, discovered in 1936). During World War II, under the Nazi regime, teams led by Schrader discovered two more organophosphate nerve agents, and a fourth after the war:

- Tabun (1936)
- Sarin (1938)
- Soman (1944)
- Cyclosarin (1949)
