= Binary chemical weapon =

Contains the toxic agent in chemical precursors

Binary chemical weapons or munitions are chemical weapons which contain the toxic agent in its active state as chemical precursors that are significantly less toxic than the agent. This improves the safety of storing, transporting, and disposing of the weapon. Commonly, firing the munition removes a barrier between two precursors. These react to form the intended agent which is then aerosolized and distributed by a bursting charge.

Binary chemical weapons are chemical weapons within the scope of the Chemical Weapons Convention and therefore their production, use and stockpiling is forbidden in most countries, as at least one of the individual chemicals is likely to be a Schedule 1 chemical for which large scale production is forbidden.

== Examples ==
One example of a binary chemical weapon is the United States Army M687. In the M687, methylphosphonyl difluoride (military name: DF, a Schedule 1 chemical) and a mixture of two agents are held in chambers within the munition, separated by a partition. When the weapon is fired, acceleration causes the partition to break, and the precursors are mixed by the rotation of the munition in flight, producing sarin nerve agent.

The Soviet Union and later Russian Federation experimented with binary munitions capable of mixing and distributing two agents that would work together in worsening the weapon's effects, an example of which would be the combination of nerve agents with blister agents.

The director of a non-proliferation research program of the Middlebury Institute of International Studies at Monterey has stated that the assassination of Kim Jong-nam due to poisoning with VX was likely carried out with a binary version of the agent, since VX fumes would otherwise have killed the suspected attackers.

== In popular culture ==
- Michael Crichton's 1972 novel Binary uses a fictional binary nerve agent "ZV" as the main plot device intended to kill the President of the United States, and indirectly most of the inhabitants of San Diego.
- A miniature binary weapon is used in an assassination in the Frederick Forsyth novel The Devil's Alternative. It consists of two half-capsules, a non-resistant one containing potassium cyanide and an acid-resistant one containing hydrochloric acid. The substances mix after the halves are assembled and the seal between them is broken, and form hydrogen cyanide. The surplus acid eats through the capsule walls of the non-resistant half, and after a delay of several hours, the lethal content is released into the intestinal tract of whoever ingested it. While technically possible, the assassination tool as discussed in the novel is presumably fictional. However, there are claims that in September 2003, the SVR (Russian Foreign Intelligence Service) prepared to assassinate Boris Berezovsky with a similar device.
- The 1989 movie Batman features the Joker distributing tainted cosmetics and hygiene products, each of which contains only a precursor to the poison Smylex. When certain combinations are used, the poison is produced, causing involuntary laughter, a rictus grin, and sudden death.
- The 2002 movie xXx features a Soviet-made binary chemical weapon codenamed "Silent Night", after its supposed ability to render an area silent by killing its inhabitants. In the movie, the chemical was acquired by the terrorist group Anarchy-99, and their leader, Yorgi, plans to launch missiles containing Silent Night from an autonomous solar-powered submarine called Ahab, with the intent to sow chaos among civilized nations as they all blame each other for the attacks.
- In the 10th and 11th episodes of the 6th season of TV-series Dexter are shown preparation and application of binary weapon consisting of two containers filled with DF and isopropyl alcohol. When mixed, the two substances form sarin.

== See also ==
- Binary explosive
- Binary liquid
- Mubtakkar
- QL (chemical) (isopropyl aminoethylmethyl phosphonite)

== General and cited references ==
- Goldfarb, Alexander & Litvinenko, Marina (2007): Death of a dissident: The Poisoning of Alexander Litvinenko and the Return of the KGB. The Free Press. ISBN 1-4165-5165-4
