= Diisopropyl methylphosphonate =

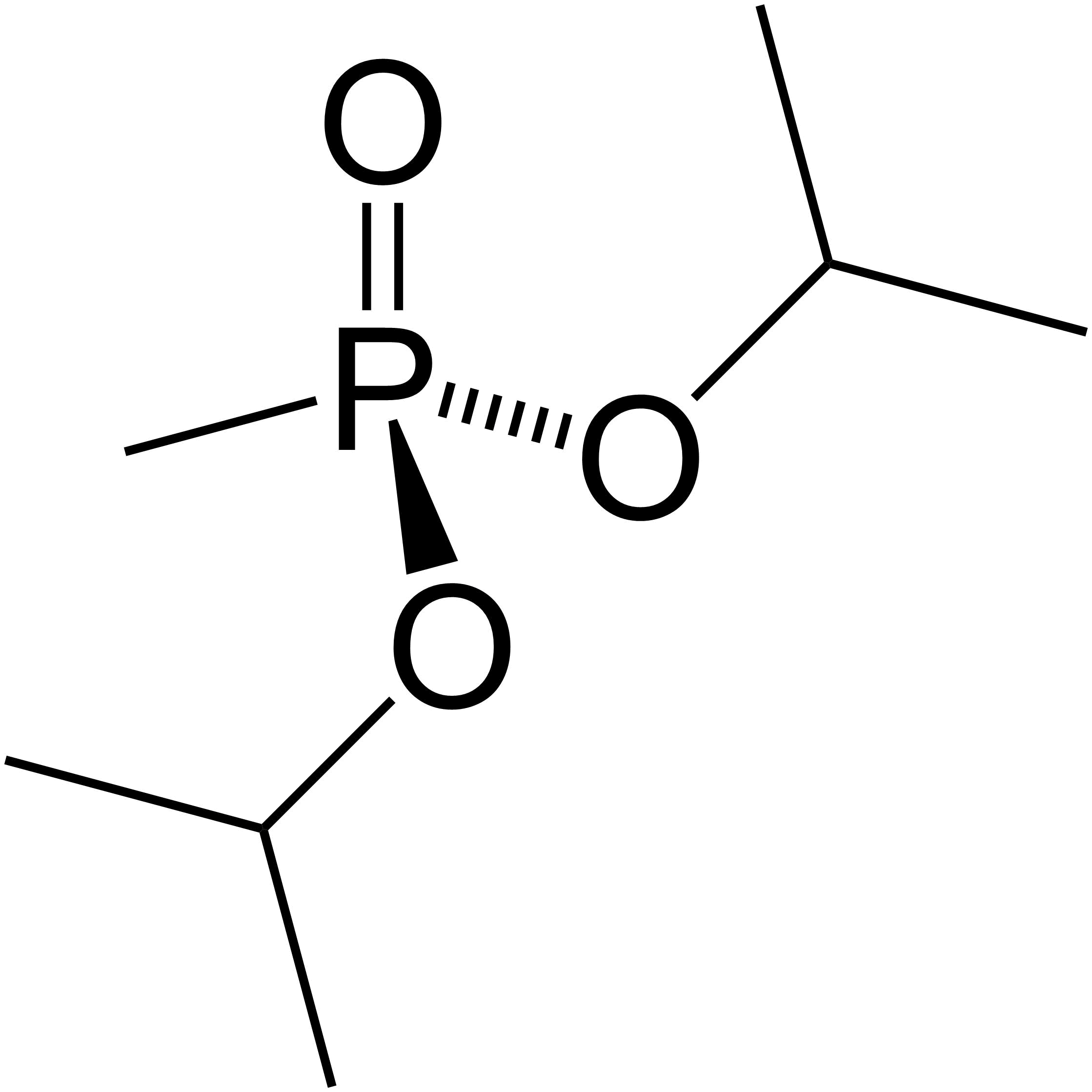
- Diisopropyl methlyphosphonate chemical structure

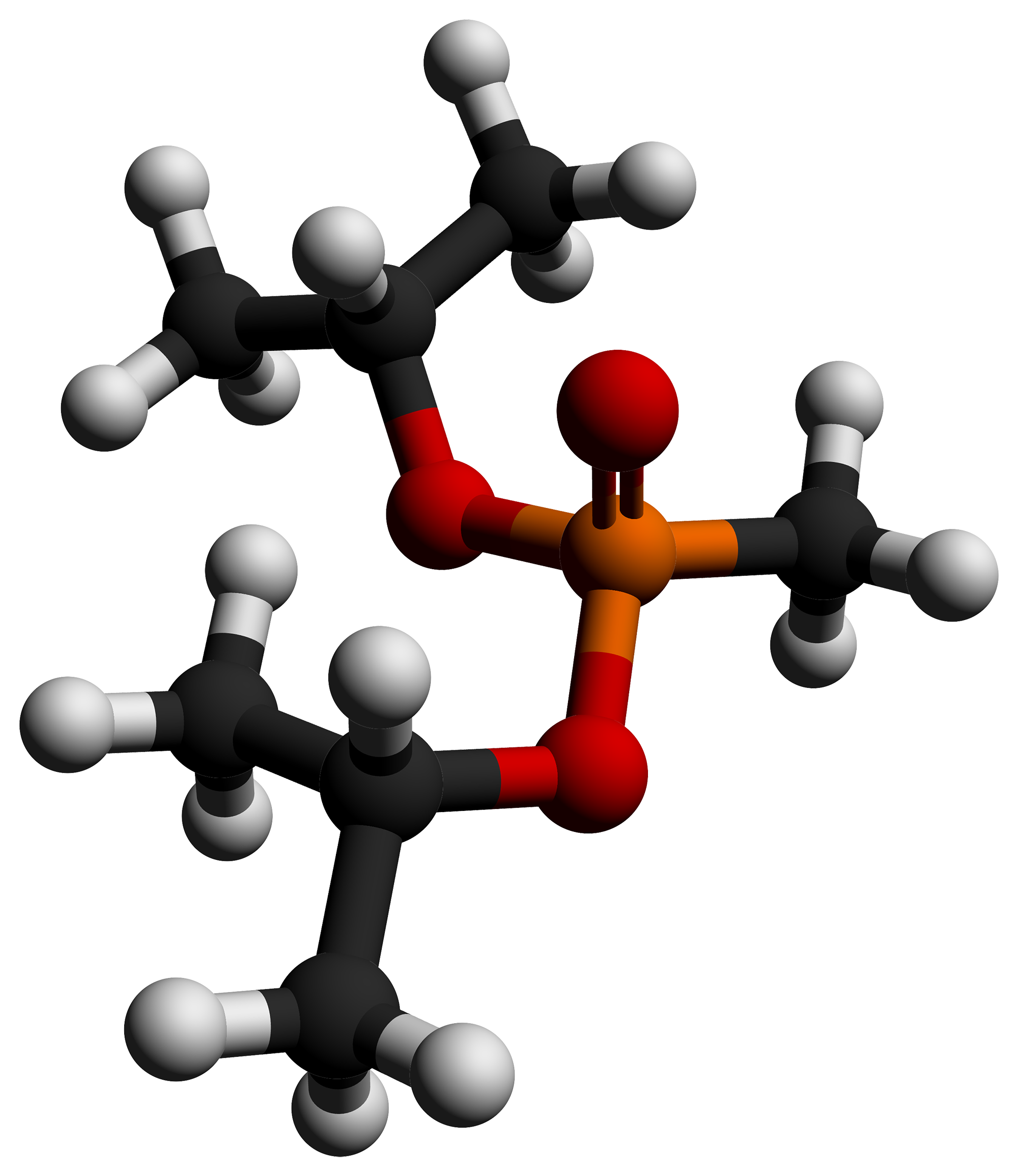

Names
- Preferred IUPAC name Di(propan-2-yl) methylphosphonate
- Other names 2-(Methyl-propan-2-yloxyphosphoryl)oxypropane

Identifiers
CAS Number	1445-75-6
3D model (JSmol)	Interactive image
Abbreviations	DIMP
ChEBI	CHEBI:77325
ChemSpider	2964
ECHA InfoCard	100.014.451
PubChem CID	3073
UNII	56V3OG5DC7
CompTox Dashboard (EPA)	DTXSID5024051
- InChI: InChI=1S/C7H17O3P/c1-6(2)9-11(5,8)10-7(3)4/h6-7H,1-5H3 Key: WOAFDHWYKSOANX-UHFFFAOYSA-N; InChI=1/C7H17O3P/c1-6(2)9-11(5,8)10-7(3)4/h6-7H,1-5H3 Key: WOAFDHWYKSOANX-UHFFFAOYAE
- SMILES: CP(OC(C)C)(OC(C)C)=O

Properties
Chemical formula	C_{7}H_{17}O_{3}P
Molar mass	180.184 g·mol^{−1}
Density	0.976 g/mL
Boiling point	215 °C (419 °F; 488 K)

Hazards
Flash point	98 °C (208 °F; 371 K)
- Except where otherwise noted, data are given for materials in their standard state (at 25 °C [77 °F], 100 kPa). Infobox references

Diisopropyl methylphosphonate (DIMP), also known as diisopropyl methane-phosphonate and phosphonic acid and methyl-bis-(1-methylethyl)ester, is a chemical by-product in the production of sarin gas when two equivalents of isopropyl alcohol react with methylphosphonyl difluoride instead of one.

DIMP is a colorless liquid that has been shown to affect the hematological (blood forming) system in animals. Its chemical formula is C_{7}H_{17}O_{3}P.

It degrades into isopropyl methylphosphonic acid.

== History ==
DIMP is a chemical by-product resulted from the manufacture of sarin (GB).

== Use ==
No commercial uses of DIMP are known to exist.

== Occurrences ==
DIMP is not known to occur naturally in the environment.

== Productions ==
=== Synthesis ===
DIMP can be prepared by a gradual addition of triisopropyl phosphite with methyl iodide, utilizing distillation technique.
