= Mubtakkar =

Mubtakkar is an Arabic word (مبتكر) with related meanings that translate into English as "invention", "initiative", or "inventive". The word was reportedly used by Al-Qaeda to describe a poison gas weapon developed and intended for use in an attack in the New York City Subway. According to author Ron Suskind, in his book The One Percent Doctrine: Deep Inside America's Pursuit of Its Enemies Since 9/11, the plan for this attack was called off about forty-five days before execution by Al-Qaeda commander Ayman al-Zawahiri.

The mubtakkar is described as a small binary chemical device that would generate large amounts of hydrogen cyanide gas, which could potentially kill hundreds in an enclosed space. The components contained in two separate containers would not be lethal to humans if individually released, so these bombs can be assembled, stored, and transported without appreciable danger. However, when the device is put into operation it releases large quantities of a lethal gas.

For further information, see Ron Suskind's The One Percent Doctrine, p. 192ff.
