= Sarin =

Chemical compound and chemical warfare nerve agent

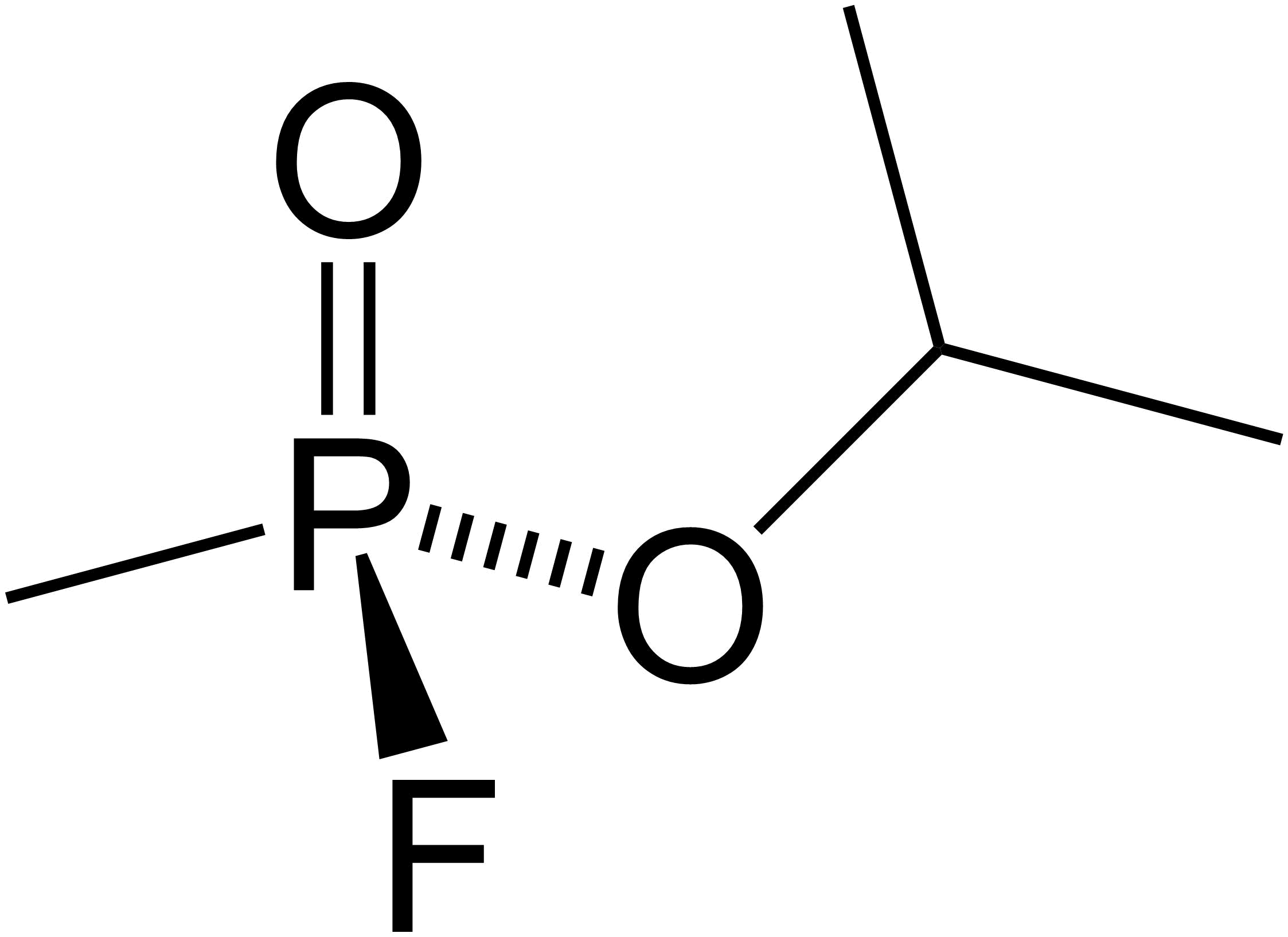

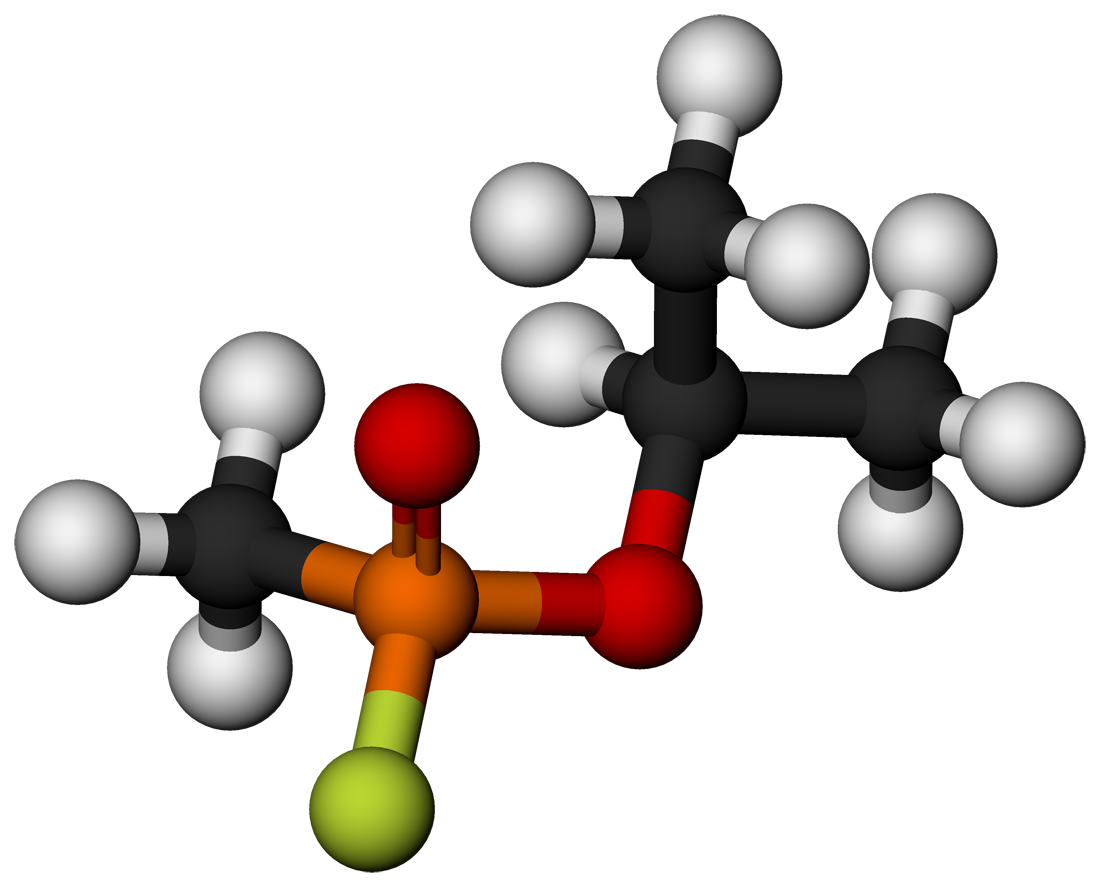
- S-Sarin

Names
Pronunciation	/ˈsɑːrɪn/
- Preferred IUPAC name Propan-2-yl methylphosphonofluoridate
- Other names (RS)-O-Isopropyl methylphosphonofluoridate; IMPF; GB; 2-(Fluoro-methylphosphoryl)oxypropane; Phosphonofluoridic acid, P-methyl-, 1-methylethyl ester EA-1208; TL-1618; T-144; Trilone 46; IMPF

Identifiers
CAS Number	107-44-8
3D model (JSmol)	Interactive image
ChEBI	CHEBI:75701
ChEMBL	ChEMBL509554
ChemSpider	7583
ECHA InfoCard	100.289.331
PubChem CID	7871
UNII	B4XG72QGFM
CompTox Dashboard (EPA)	DTXSID0042371
- InChI: InChI=1S/C4H10FO2P/c1-4(2)7-8(3,5)6/h4H,1-3H3 Key: DYAHQFWOVKZOOW-UHFFFAOYSA-N; InChI=1/C4H10FO2P/c1-4(2)7-8(3,5)6/h4H,1-3H3; InChI=1/C4H10FO2P/c1-4(2)7-8(3,5)6/h4H,1-3H3 Key: DYAHQFWOVKZOOW-UHFFFAOYAY
- SMILES: FP(=O)(OC(C)C)C

Properties
Chemical formula	C_{4}H_{10}FO_{2}P
Molar mass	140.094 g·mol^{−1}
Appearance	Clear colourless liquid, brownish if impure
Odor	Odourless in pure form. Impure sarin can smell like mustard or burned rubber.
Density	1.0887 g/cm^{3} (25 °C); 1.102 g/cm^{3} (20 °C)
Melting point	−56 °C (−69 °F; 217 K)
Boiling point	158 °C (316 °F; 431 K)
Solubility in water	Miscible
log P	0.30

Hazards
- Occupational safety and health (OHS/OSH)
Main hazards	Extremely lethal cholinergic agent.
- GHS labelling
Pictograms	(GHS06: Toxic)
NFPA 704 (fire diamond)	4 1 1
Threshold limit value (TLV)	0.00003 mg/m^{3} (TWA), 0.0001 mg/m^{3} (STEL)
- Lethal dose or concentration (LD, LC)
LD_{50} (median dose)	39 μg/kg (intravenous, rat)
- NIOSH (US health exposure limits)
IDLH (Immediate danger)	0.1 mg/m^{3}
Safety data sheet (SDS)	Lethal Nerve Agent Sarin (GB)
- Except where otherwise noted, data are given for materials in their standard state (at 25 °C [77 °F], 100 kPa). verify (what is ?) Infobox references

Sarin (NATO designation GB short for G-series, B) is an extremely toxic organophosphorus compound that has been often used as a chemical weapon due to its extreme potency as a nerve agent.

Sarin is a volatile, colorless and odorless liquid. Exposure can be lethal even at very low concentrations, and death can occur within one to ten minutes after direct inhalation of a lethal dose due to suffocation from respiratory paralysis, unless antidotes are quickly administered. Those who absorb a non-lethal dose and do not receive immediate medical treatment may still suffer permanent neurological damage.

Sarin is widely considered a weapon of mass destruction. Production and stockpiling of sarin was outlawed as of April 1997 by the Chemical Weapons Convention of 1993, and it is classified as a Schedule 1 substance.

== Health effects ==
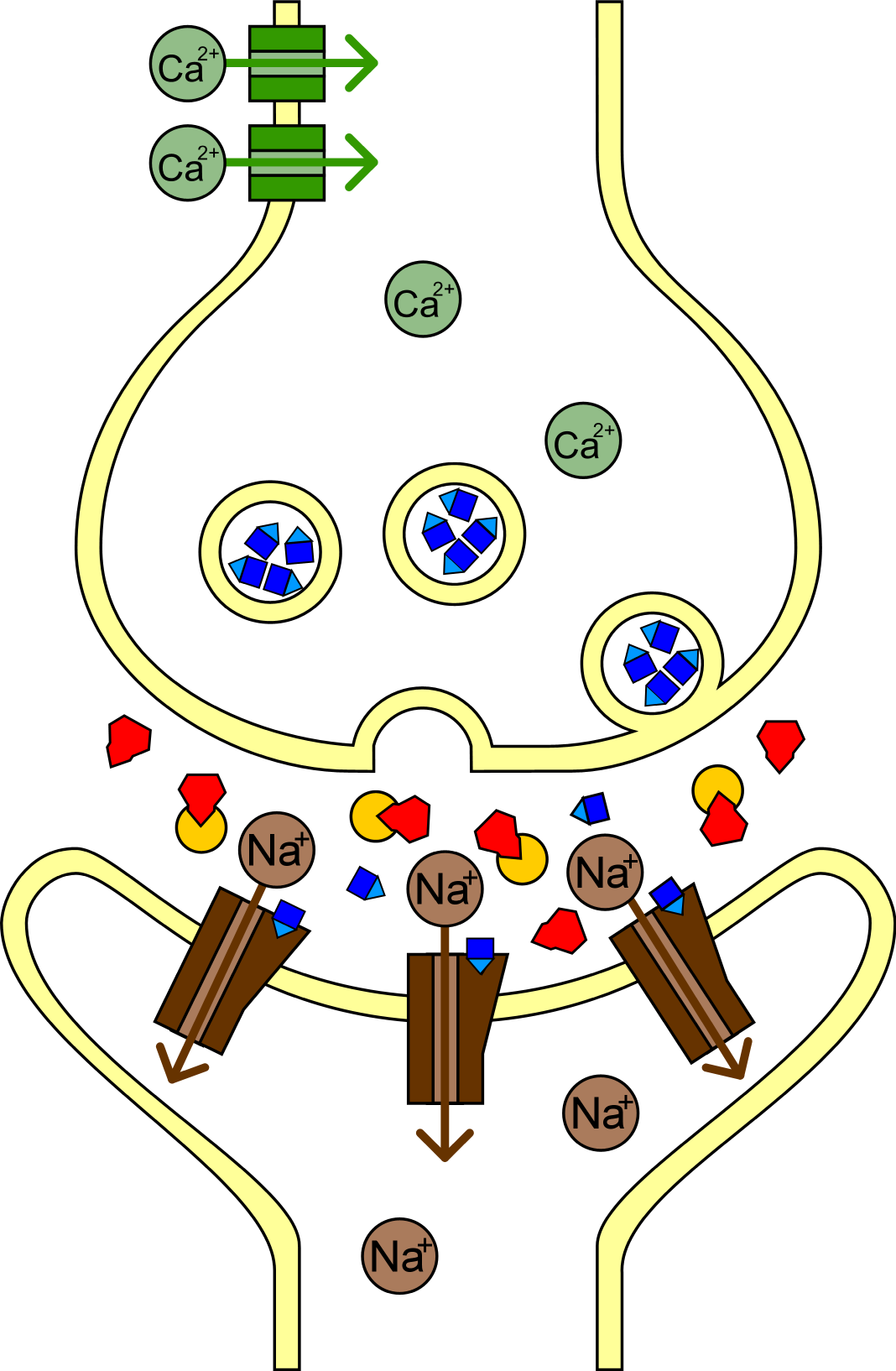
Biological effects of sarin in the neuromuscular junction. Sarin (red) inhibits the function of acetylcholinesterase (yellow), preventing degradation of acetylcholine (blue)

Like some other nerve agents that affect the neurotransmitter acetylcholine, sarin attacks the nervous system by interfering with the degradation of the neurotransmitter acetylcholine at neuromuscular junctions. Death usually occurs as a result of asphyxia due to the inability to control the muscles involved in breathing.

Initial symptoms following exposure to sarin are a runny nose, tightness in the chest, and constriction of the pupils (miotic action). Soon after, the person will have difficulty breathing and experience nausea and drooling. This progresses to losing control of bodily functions, which may cause the person to vomit, defecate, and urinate. This phase is followed by twitching and jerking. Ultimately, the person becomes comatose and suffocates in a series of convulsive spasms. Common mnemonics for the symptomatology of organophosphate poisoning, including sarin, are the "killer Bs" of bronchorrhea and bronchospasm because they are the leading cause of death, and SLUDGE – salivation, lacrimation, urination, defecation, gastrointestinal distress, and emesis (vomiting). Death may follow in one to ten minutes after direct inhalation, but may also occur after a delay ranging from hours to several weeks in cases where exposure is limited but no antidote is applied.

Sarin has a high volatility (ease with which a liquid can turn into vapour) relative to similar nerve agents, making inhalation very easy. Sarin vapors are heavier than air, so vapors can accumulate in lower terrains. It may even absorb through the skin. A person's clothing can release sarin for about 30 minutes after it has come in contact with sarin gas, which can lead to its exposure to other people.

=== Management ===
Treatment measures have been described. Treatment is typically with the antidotes atropine and pralidoxime. Atropine, an antagonist to muscarinic acetylcholine receptors from the nightshade family, is given to treat the physiological symptoms of poisoning. Since muscular response to acetylcholine is mediated through nicotinic acetylcholine receptors, atropine does not counteract the muscular symptoms. Pralidoxime can regenerate cholinesterases if administered within approximately five hours. Biperiden, a synthetic acetylcholine antagonist, has been suggested as an alternative to atropine due to its better blood–brain barrier penetration and higher efficacy.

Asoxime chloride, commonly known as HI-6, has been shown to be significantly more effective for AChE reactivation in Sarin poisoning than standard oximes such as pralidoxime (or 2-PAM) and obidoxime. Novel substituted phenoxyalkyl pyridinium oximes are being investigated as an alternative to pralidoxime.

=== Mechanism of action ===
Sarin is a potent inhibitor of acetylcholinesterase, an enzyme that degrades the neurotransmitter acetylcholine after it is released into the synaptic cleft. In vertebrates, acetylcholine is the neurotransmitter used at the neuromuscular junction, where signals are transmitted between neurons from the peripheral nervous system to muscle fibres. Normally, acetylcholine is released from the neuron to stimulate the muscle, after which it is degraded by acetylcholinesterase, allowing the muscle to relax. A build-up of acetylcholine in the synaptic cleft, due to the inhibition of acetylcholinesterase, means the neurotransmitter continues to act on the muscle fibre, so that any nerve impulses are effectively continually transmitted.

Sarin acts on acetylcholinesterase by forming a covalent bond with the particular serine residue at the active site. Fluoride is the leaving group, and the resulting organo-phosphoester is robust and biologically inactive.

Its mechanism of action resembles that of some commonly used insecticides, such as malathion. In terms of biological activity, it resembles carbamate insecticides, such as Sevin, and the medicines pyridostigmine, neostigmine, and physostigmine.

=== Diagnostic tests ===
Controlled studies in healthy men have shown that a nontoxic 0.43 mg oral dose administered in several portions over a 3-day interval caused average maximum depressions of 22 and 30%, respectively, in plasma and erythrocyte acetylcholinesterase levels. A single acute 0.5 mg dose caused mild symptoms of intoxication and an average reduction of 38% in both measures of acetylcholinesterase activity. Sarin in blood is rapidly degraded either in vivo or in vitro. Its primary inactive metabolites have in vivo serum half-lives of approximately 24 hours. The serum level of unbound isopropyl methylphosphonic acid (IMPA), a sarin hydrolysis product, ranged from 2–135 μg/L in survivors of a terrorist attack during the first four hours post-exposure. Sarin or its metabolites may be determined in blood or urine by gas or liquid chromatography, while acetylcholinesterase activity is usually measured by enzymatic methods.

A newer method called "fluoride regeneration" or "fluoride reactivation" detects the presence of nerve agents for a longer period after exposure than the methods described above. Fluoride reactivation is a technique that has been explored since at least the early 2000s. This technique obviates some of the deficiencies of older procedures. Sarin not only reacts with the water in the blood plasma through hydrolysis (forming so-called 'free metabolites'), but also reacts with various proteins to form 'protein adducts'. These protein adducts are not so easily removed from the body, and remain for a longer period of time than the free metabolites. One clear advantage of this process is that the period, post-exposure, for determination of sarin exposure is much longer, possibly five to eight weeks according to at least one study.

=== Toxicity ===
As a nerve gas, sarin in its purest form is estimated to be 26 times more deadly than cyanide. The LD_{50} of subcutaneously injected sarin in mice is 172 μg/kg.

Sarin is highly toxic, whether by contact with the skin or breathed in. The toxicity of sarin in humans is largely based on calculations from studies with animals. The lethal concentration of sarin in air is approximately 28–35 mg per cubic meter per minute for a two-minute exposure time by a healthy adult breathing normally (exchanging 15 liters of air per minute, lower 28 mg/m^{3} value is for general population). This number represents the estimated lethal concentration for 50% of exposed victims, the LCt_{50} value. The LCt_{95} or LCt_{100} value is estimated to be 40–83 mg per cubic meter for exposure time of two minutes. Calculating effects for different exposure times and concentrations requires following specific toxic load models. In general, brief exposures to higher concentrations are more lethal than comparable long time exposures to low concentrations. There are many ways to make relative comparisons between toxic substances. The list below compares sarin to some current and historic chemical warfare agents, with a direct comparison to the respiratory LCt_{50}:

- Chlorine, 19,000 mg/(min·m^{3}) – Sarin is 543 times more lethal
- Hydrogen cyanide, 2,860 mg/(min·m^{3}) – Sarin is 81 times more lethal
- Phosgene, 1,500 mg/(min·m^{3}) – Sarin is 43 times more lethal
- Sulfur mustard, 1,000 mg/(min·m^{3}) – Sarin is 28 times more lethal

== Production and structure ==
Sarin is a chiral molecule because it has four chemically distinct substituents attached to the tetrahedral phosphorus center. The S_{P} form (the (–) optical isomer) is the more active enantiomer due to its greater binding affinity to acetylcholinesterase.

It is almost always manufactured as a racemic mixture (a 1:1 mixture of its enantiomeric forms) as this involves a much simpler synthesis while providing an adequate weapon. The R_{P} form is slightly less toxic, so most syntheses do not waste resources attempting to separate it from the racemic mixture.

A number of production pathways can be used to create sarin. The final reaction typically involves attachment of the isopropoxy group to the phosphorus with an alcoholysis with isopropyl alcohol. Two variants of this final step are common. One is the reaction of methylphosphonyl difluoride with isopropyl alcohol, which produces a racemic mixture of sarin enantiomers with hydrofluoric acid as a byproduct:

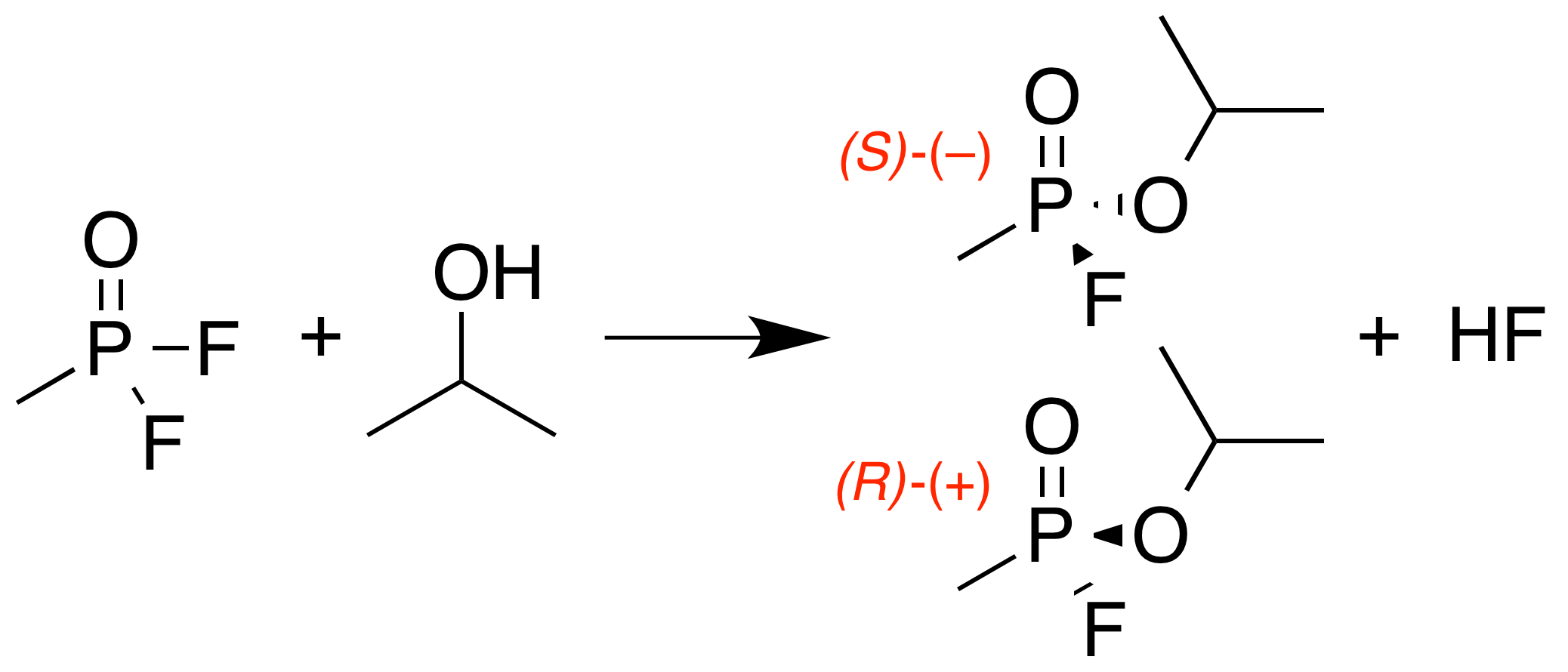

The second process, known as the "Di-Di" process, uses equimolar quantities of methylphosphonyl difluoride (Difluoro) and methylphosphonyl dichloride (Dichloro). This reaction gives sarin, hydrochloric acid and other minor byproducts. The Di-Di process was used by the United States for the production of its unitary sarin stockpile.

The scheme below shows a generic example that employs the Di-Di method as the final esterification step; in reality, the selection of reagents and reaction conditions dictate both product structure and yield. The choice of enantiomer of the mixed chloro fluoro intermediate displayed in the diagram is arbitrary, but the final substitution is selective for chloro over fluoro as the leaving group. Inert atmosphere and anhydrous conditions (Schlenk techniques) are used for synthesis of sarin and other organophosphates.

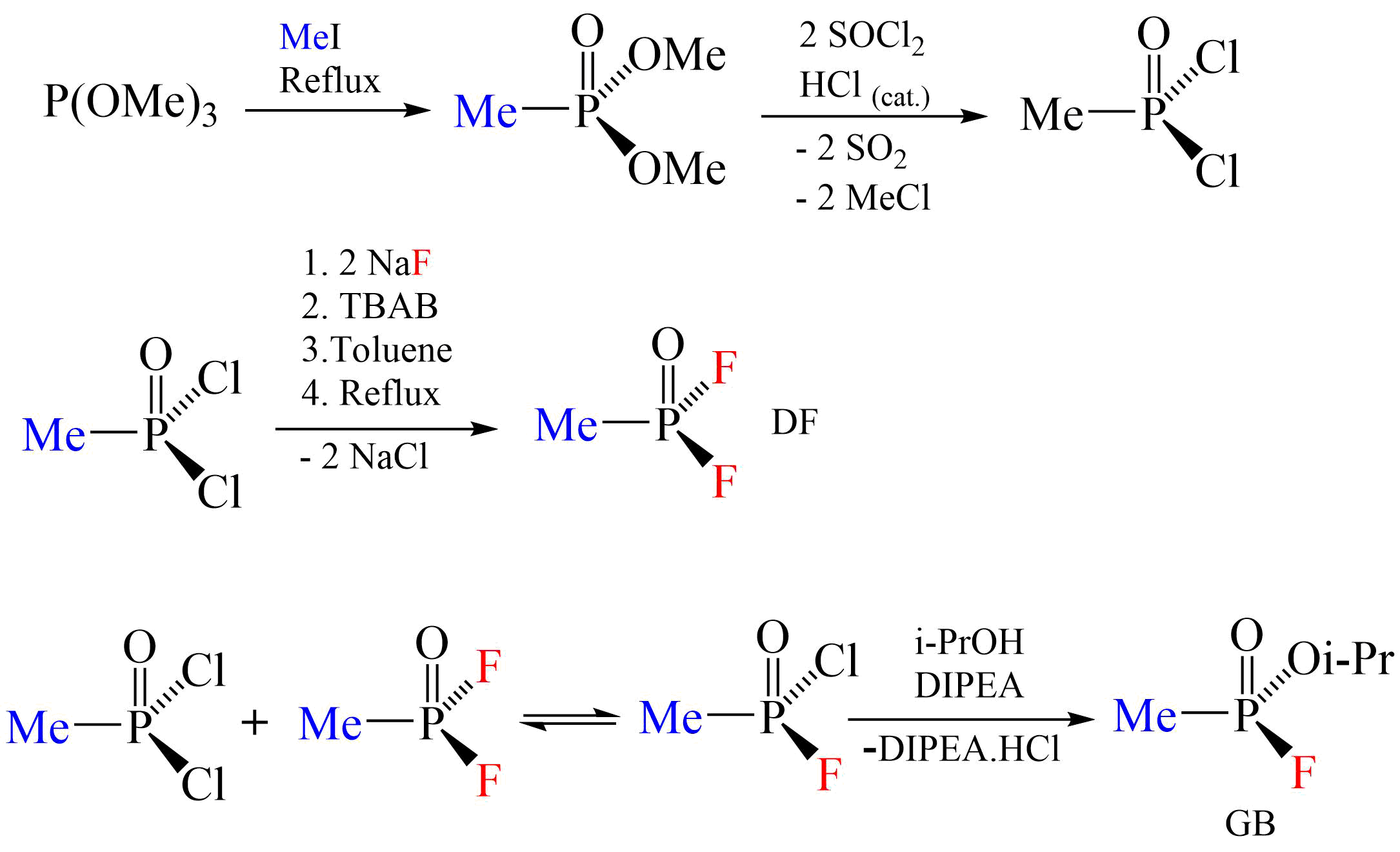
An example of "di-di" process using arbitrary reagents.

As both reactions leave considerable acid in the product, sarin produced in bulk by these methods has a short half-life without further processing, and would be corrosive to containers and damaging to weapons systems. Various methods have been tried to resolve these problems. In addition to industrial refining techniques to purify the chemical itself, various additives have been tried to combat the effects of the acid, such as:

- Tributylamine was added to US sarin produced at Rocky Mountain Arsenal.
- Triethylamine was added to UK sarin, with relatively poor success. The Aum Shinrikyo cult experimented with triethylamine as well.
- N,N-Diethylaniline was used by Aum Shinrikyo for acid reduction.
- Ammonia gas was used by Nazi Germany as a non-additive stabilizer at RVIII Raubkammer, with success. Recovered artillery munitions filled with sarin from RVIII Raubkammer, in Munster, abandoned for half a century, showed a sarin concentration of over 80%.
- N,N′-Diisopropylcarbodimide was added to sarin produced at Rocky Mountain Arsenal to combat corrosion.
- Isopropylamine was included as part of the M687 155 mm field artillery shell, which was a binary sarin weapon system developed by the US Army.

Another byproduct of these two chemical processes is diisopropyl methylphosphonate, formed when a second isopropyl alcohol reacts with the sarin itself and from disproportionation of sarin, when distilled incorrectly. The factor of its formation in esterification is that as the concentration of DF-DCl decreases, the concentration of sarin increases, the probability of DIMP formation is greater. DIMP is a natural impurity of sarin, that is almost impossible to be eliminated, mathematically, when the reaction is a 1 mol-1 mol "one-stream".

(CH_{3})_{2}CHO^{−} + CH_{3}P(O)FOCH(CH_{3})_{2} → CH_{3}P(O)(OCH(CH_{3})_{2})_{2} + F^{−}

== Degradation and shelf life ==
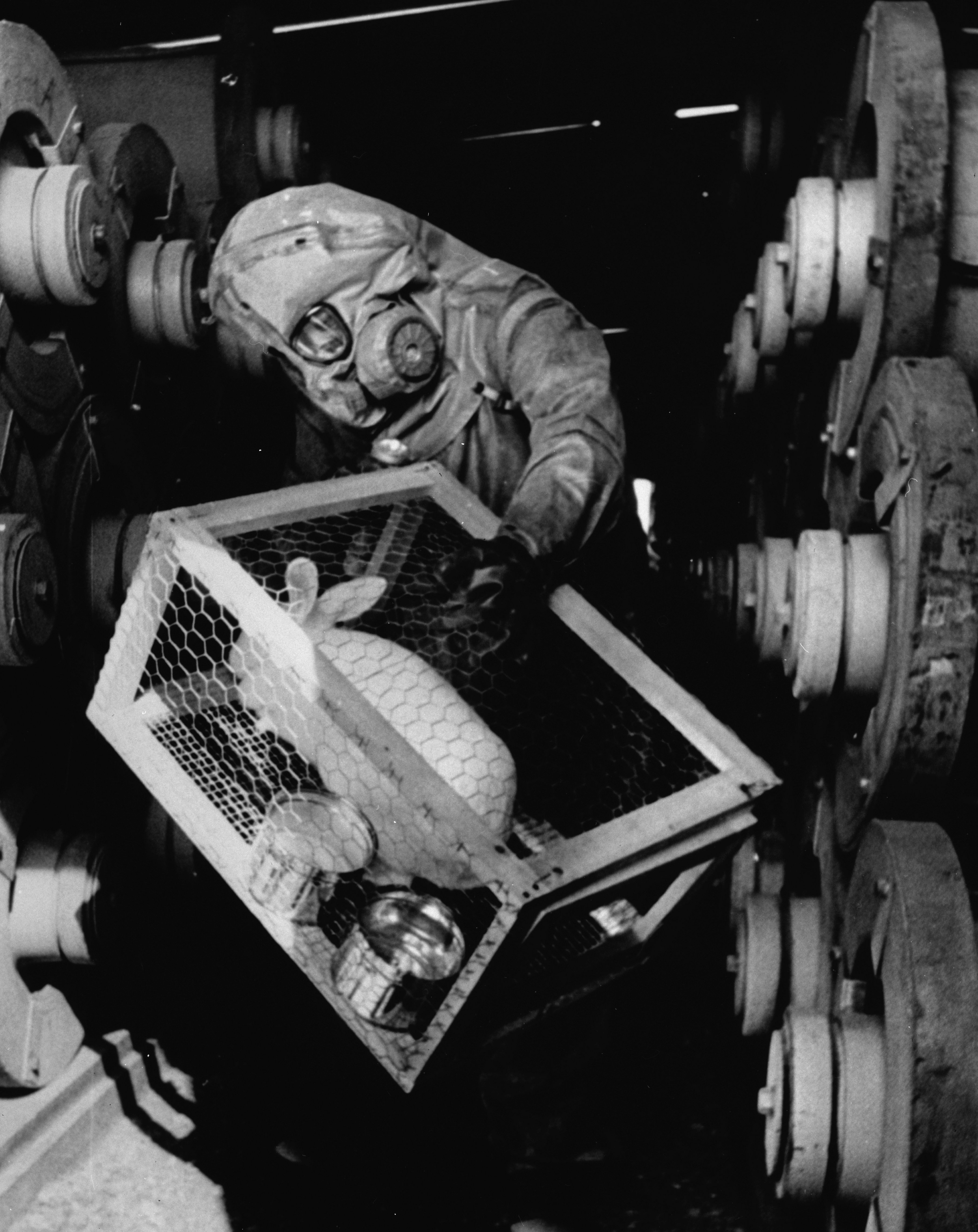
Rabbit used to check for leaks at former sarin production plant (Rocky Mountain Arsenal), 1970

Degradation of phosphoryl halides begins with hydrolysis of the bond between phosphorus and the fluorine atom. This P-F bond is easily broken by nucleophilic agents through a SN2 mechanism, such as water and hydroxide. At high pH, sarin decomposes rapidly to relatively nontoxic phosphonic acid derivatives. The initial breakdown of sarin is into isopropyl methylphosphonic acid (IMPA), a chemical that is not commonly found in nature except as a breakdown product of sarin (this is useful for detecting the recent deployment of sarin as a weapon). IMPA then degrades into methylphosphonic acid (MPA), which can also be produced by other organophosphates.

Sarin with residual acid degrades after a period of several weeks to several months. The shelf life can be shortened by impurities in precursor materials. According to the CIA, some Iraqi sarin had a shelf life of only a few weeks, owing mostly to impure precursors.

Along with nerve agents such as tabun and VX, sarin can have a short shelf life. Therefore, it is usually stored as two separate precursors that produce sarin when combined. Sarin's shelf life can be extended by increasing the purity of the precursor and intermediates and incorporating stabilizers such as tributylamine. In some formulations, tributylamine is replaced by diisopropylcarbodiimide (DIC), allowing sarin to be stored in aluminium casings. In binary chemical weapons, the two precursors are stored separately in the same shell and mixed to form the agent immediately before or when the shell is in flight. This approach has the dual benefit of solving the stability issue and increasing the safety of sarin munitions.

== History ==
Sarin was discovered in 1938 in Wuppertal-Elberfeld in Germany by scientists at IG Farben who were attempting to create stronger pesticides; it is the most toxic of the four G-Series nerve agents made by Germany. The compound, which followed the discovery of the nerve agent tabun, was named in honor of its discoverers: chemist Gerhard Schrader, chemist Otto Ambros, chemist Gerhard Ritter, and from Heereswaffenamt Hans-Jürgen von der Linde.

=== Use as a weapon ===
In mid-1939, the formula for the agent was passed to the chemical warfare section of the German Army Weapons Office, which ordered that it be brought into mass production for wartime use. Pilot plants were built, and a production facility was under construction (but was not finished) by the end of World War II. Estimates for total sarin production by Nazi Germany range from 500 kg to 10 tons.

Though sarin, tabun, and soman were incorporated into artillery shells, Germany did not use nerve agents against Allied targets. Adolf Hitler refused to initiate the use of gases such as sarin as weapons.

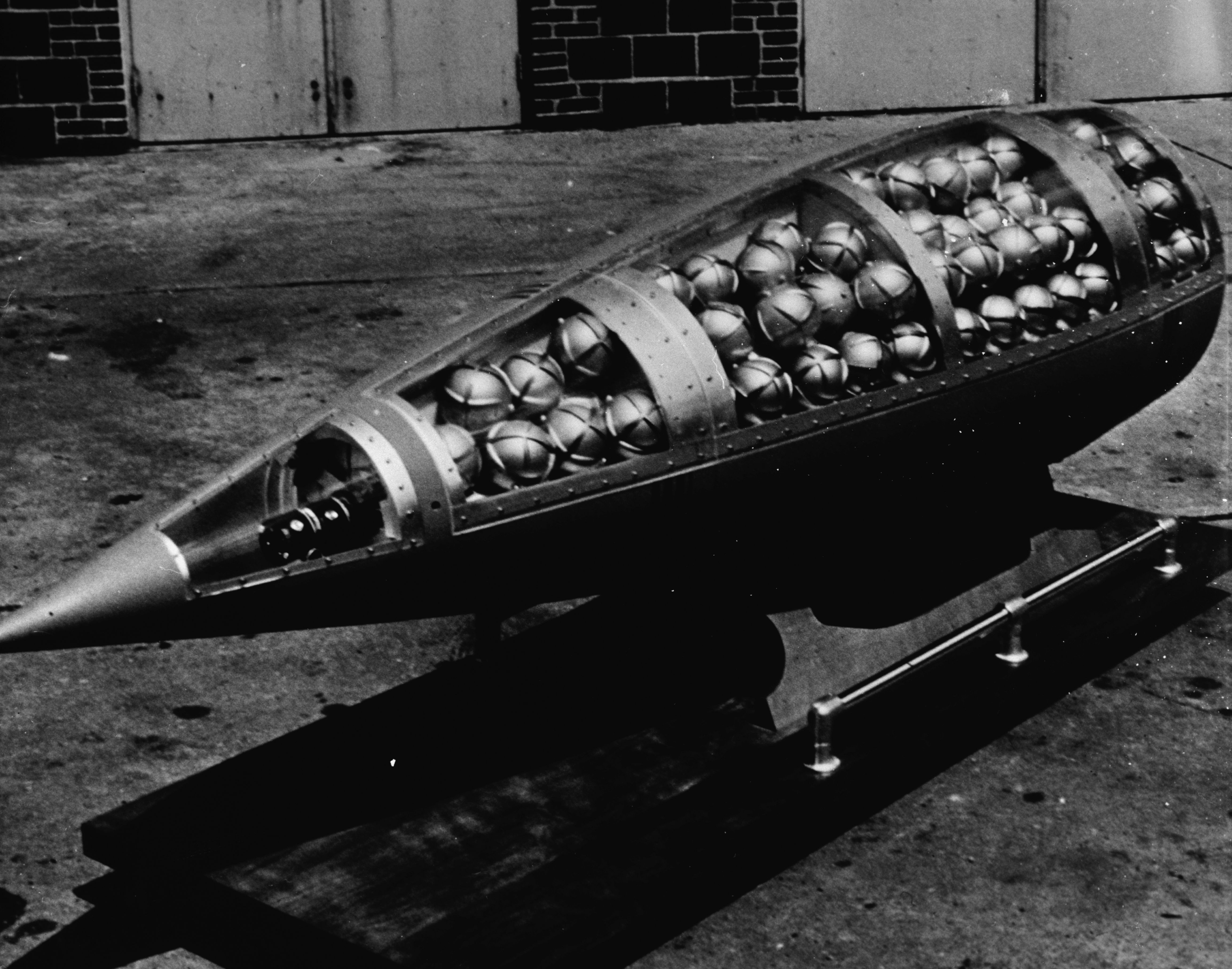
U.S. Honest John missile warhead cutaway, showing M134 Sarin bomblets (c. 1960)

Sarin gas used against animals in a weapons experiment

- 1950s (early): NATO adopted sarin as a standard chemical weapon. The USSR and the United States produced sarin for military purposes.
- 1953: 20-year-old Ronald Maddison, a Royal Air Force engineer from Consett, County Durham, died in human testing of sarin at the Porton Down chemical warfare testing facility in Wiltshire, England. Ten days after his death an inquest was held in secret which returned a verdict of misadventure. In 2004, the inquest was reopened and, after a 64-day inquest hearing, the jury ruled that Maddison had been unlawfully killed by the "application of a nerve agent in a non-therapeutic experiment".
- 1957: Regular production of sarin chemical weapons ceased in the United States, though existing stocks of bulk sarin were re-distilled until 1970.
- 1970: During Operation Tailwind, America may have deployed sarin against the Communist Pathet Lao, alongside American defectors to the Laotian Communists.
- 1976: Chile's intelligence service, DINA, assigned biochemist Eugenio Berríos to develop Sarin gas within its program Proyecto Andrea, to be used as a weapon against its opponents. One of DINA's goals was to package it in spray cans for easy use, which, according to testimony by former DINA agent Michael Townley, was one of the planned procedures in the 1976 assassination of Orlando Letelier. Berríos later testified that it was used in a number of assassinations and it was planned to be used to kill inhabitants, through poisoning the water supply of Argentine capital Buenos Aires, in case Operation Soberanía took place.
- March 1988: Halabja chemical attack; Over two days in March, the ethnic Kurdish city of Halabja in northern Iraq (population 70,000) was bombarded by Saddam Hussein's Iraqi Air Force jets with chemical bombs including sarin. An estimated 5,000 people died, almost all civilians.
- April 1988: Iraq used Sarin four times against Iranian soldiers at the end of the Iran–Iraq War, helping Iraqi forces to retake control of the al-Faw Peninsula during the Second Battle of al-Faw.
- 1993: The United Nations Chemical Weapons Convention was signed by 162 member countries, banning the production and stockpiling of many chemical weapons, including sarin. It went into effect on April 29, 1997, and called for the complete destruction of all specified stockpiles of chemical weapons by April 2007. When the convention entered force, the parties declared worldwide stockpiles of 15,047 tonnes of sarin. As of November 28, 2019, 98% of the stockpiles have been destroyed.
- 1994: Matsumoto incident; the Japanese cult Aum Shinrikyo released an impure form of sarin in Matsumoto, Nagano, killing eight people and harming over 500. The Australian sheep station Banjawarn was a testing ground.
- 1995: Tokyo subway sarin attack; the Aum Shinrikyo cult released an impure form of sarin in the Tokyo Metro. Thirteen people died, and over 6,200 people received injuries.
- 2002: Pro-Chechen militant Ibn al-Khattab may have been assassinated with sarin by the Russian government.
- May 2004: Iraqi insurgents detonated a 155 mm shell containing binary precursors for sarin near a U.S. convoy in Iraq. The shell was designed to mix the chemicals as it spun during flight. The detonated shell released only a small amount of sarin gas, either because the explosion failed to mix the binary agents properly or because the chemicals inside the shell had degraded with age. Two United States soldiers were treated after displaying the early symptoms of exposure to sarin.
- March 2013: Khan al-Assal chemical attack; Sarin was used in an attack on a town west of Aleppo city in Syria, killing 28 and wounding 124.
- August 2013: Ghouta chemical attack; Sarin was used in multiple simultaneous attacks in the Ghouta region of the Rif Dimashq Governorate of Syria during the Syrian Civil War. Varying sources gave a death toll of 322 to 1,729.
- April 2017: Khan Shaykhun chemical attack: The Syrian Air Force released sarin gas in rebel-held Idlib Province in Syria during an airstrike.
- April 2018: Victims of the Douma chemical attack in Syria reported to have symptoms consistent with exposure to sarin and other agents. On July 6, 2018, the Fact-Finding Mission (FFM) of the OPCW published their interim report. The report stated that, "The results show that no organophosphorous [sarin] nerve agents or their degradation products were detected in the environmental samples or in the plasma samples taken from alleged casualties". The chemical agent used in the attack was later identified as elemental chlorine.
- July 2023: The U.S. destroyed the last of its declared chemical weapons, a sarin nerve agent-filled M55 rocket, on July 7, 2023.

== See also ==
- Chlorosarin
- Ethylsarin
- Thiosarin
- Gulf War syndrome
