= Nerve agent =

Class of organophosphates; classified as weapons of mass destruction

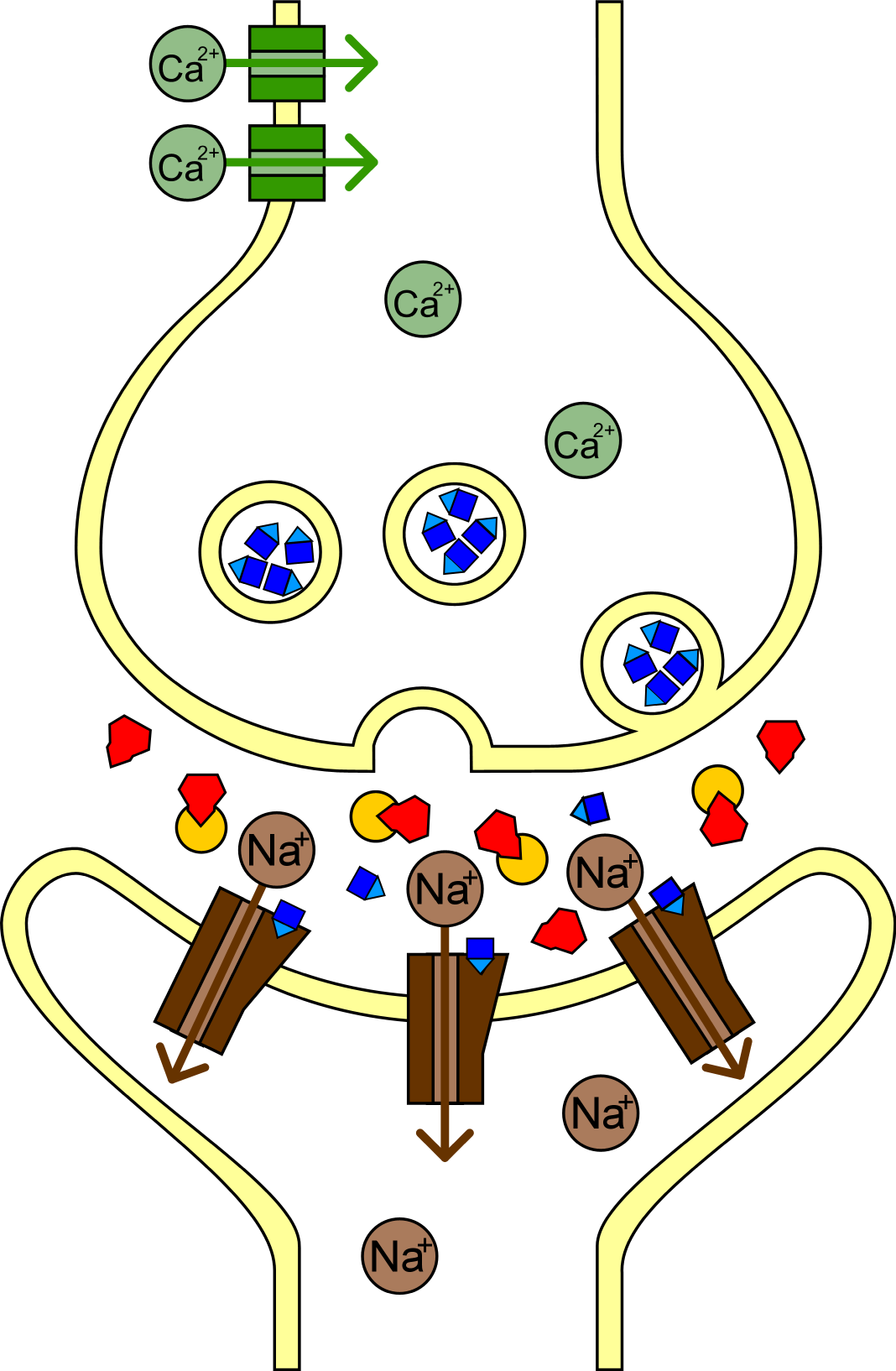
Nerve agents act in the neuromuscular junction. Sarin (red) inhibits the function of acetylcholinesterase (yellow), preventing breakdown of acetylcholine (blue). Acetylcholine buildup causes continuous nerve impulses.

Nerve agents, sometimes also called nerve gases, are a class of organic chemicals that disrupt the mechanisms by which nerves transfer messages to organs. The disruption is caused by the blocking of acetylcholinesterase (AChE), an enzyme that catalyzes the breakdown of acetylcholine, a neurotransmitter. Nerve agents are irreversible acetylcholinesterase inhibitors used as poison.

Poisoning by a nerve agent leads to constriction of pupils, profuse salivation, convulsions, and involuntary urination and defecation, with the first symptoms appearing in seconds after exposure. Death by asphyxiation or cardiac arrest may follow in minutes due to the loss of the body's control over respiratory and other muscles. Standard treatment for nerve agent poisoning is a combination of an anticholinergic to manage the symptoms, and an oxime as an antidote.

The most mass-produced nerve agents in history are VX/VR, sarin, and soman. The G-series consists of the earliest nerve agents discovered from the late 1930s, which are typically volatile and dangerous via inhalation as aerosols. The V-series, discovered after the 1950s, are far less volatile and more persistent, and threaten via skin absorption, requiring a full body suit. Both series, and some Novichok-series compounds, are organophosphate compounds, while other Novichok agents, and some carbamate nerve agents, have non-organophosphate chemistry. Some are formed by binary chemical weapon munitions, such as the US M687 artillery shell which formed sarin by mixing its chemical precursors.

The first nerve agents were discovered by IG Farben in Nazi Germany. The extreme toxicity of tabun was learned in 1936, followed by sarin in 1938 and soman in 1944. The Wehrmacht became the first military to stockpile nerve agent munitions, but they were not used for fear of Allied retaliation. France, the Soviet Union, the United Kingdom, and the United States all captured and studied German nerve munitions. During the Cold War, the Soviet and United States chemical weapons program became the first and second largest in history, stockpiling thousands of tons of nerve agents alongside mustard gas.

Ba'athist Iraq also developed nerve agents, becoming the first country to use them in warfare, killing tens of thousands of civilians and troops in the Iran–Iraq War. This began with a tabun attack in 1984 and included the Halabja massacre, which killed over 3,000 people. The Japanese doomsday cult Aum Shinrikyo was the first to use nerve agents for chemical terrorism, killing dozens in the 1994 Matsumoto sarin attack, 1995 Tokyo subway sarin attack, and assassination attempts with VX-filled syringes. Ba'athist Syria's also used sarin in the Syrian civil war, including the 2013 Ghouta attack, which killed between three hundred and seventeen hundred people.

Nerve agent development, production, and stockpiling were first comprehensively banned by the 1993 Chemical Weapons Convention, adopted by 193 states as of 2026. Despite this, nerve agents were used in the assassination of Kim Jong-nam and poisoning of Sergei and Yulia Skripal, allegedly ordered by North Korea and Russia respectively.

Nerve agents are generally colorless liquids under normal conditions; the popular term "nerve gas" is inaccurate. Agents sarin and VX are odorless; tabun has a slightly fruity odor and soman has a slight camphor odor.

== Biological effects ==
Nerve agents attack the nervous system. All such agents function the same way resulting in cholinergic crisis: they inhibit the enzyme acetylcholinesterase, which is responsible for the breakdown of acetylcholine (ACh) in the synapses between nerves that control whether muscle tissues are to relax or contract. If the agent cannot be broken down, muscles are prevented from receiving 'relax' signals and they are effectively paralyzed. It is the compounding of this paralysis throughout the body that quickly leads to more severe complications, including the heart and the muscles used for breathing. Because of this, the first symptoms usually appear within 30 seconds of exposure and death can occur via asphyxiation or cardiac arrest in a few minutes, depending upon the dose received and the agent used.

Initial symptoms following exposure to nerve agents (like Sarin) are a runny nose, tightness in the chest, and constriction of the pupils. Soon after, the victim will have difficulty breathing and will experience nausea and salivation. As the victim continues to lose control of bodily functions, involuntary salivation, lacrimation, urination, defecation, gastrointestinal pain and vomiting will be experienced. Blisters and burning of the eyes and/or lungs may also occur. This phase is followed by initially myoclonic jerks (muscle jerks) followed by status epilepticus–type epileptic seizure. Death then comes via complete respiratory depression, most likely via the excessive peripheral activity at the neuromuscular junction of the diaphragm.

The effects of nerve agents are long lasting and increase with continued exposure. Survivors of nerve agent poisoning almost invariably develop chronic neurological damage and related psychiatric effects. Possible effects that can last for years after exposure include blurred vision, tiredness, declined memory, hoarse voice, palpitations, sleeplessness, shoulder stiffness and eye strain.

=== Mechanism of action ===
When a normally functioning motor nerve is stimulated, it releases the neurotransmitter acetylcholine, which transmits the impulse to a muscle or organ. Once the impulse is sent, the enzyme acetylcholinesterase immediately breaks down the acetylcholine in order to allow the muscle or organ to relax.

Nerve agents disrupt the nervous system by inhibiting the function of the enzyme acetylcholinesterase by forming a covalent bond with its active site, where acetylcholine would normally be broken down (undergo hydrolysis). Acetylcholine thus builds up and continues to act so that any nerve impulses are continually transmitted and muscle contractions do not stop. This same action also occurs at the gland and organ levels, resulting in uncontrolled drooling, tearing of the eyes (lacrimation) and excess production of mucus from the nose (rhinorrhea).

The reaction product of the most important nerve agents, including soman, sarin, tabun and VX, with acetylcholinesterase were solved by the U.S. Army using X-ray crystallography in the 1990s. The reaction products have been confirmed subsequently using different sources of acetylcholinesterase and the closely related target enzyme, butyrylcholinesterase. The X-ray structures clarify important aspects of the reaction mechanism (e.g., stereochemical inversion) at atomic resolution and provide a key tool for antidote development.

=== Treatment ===
Standard treatment for nerve agent poisoning is a combination of an anticholinergic to manage the symptoms, and an oxime as an antidote. Anticholinergics treat the symptoms by reducing the effects of acetylcholine, while oximes displaces phosphate molecules from the active site of the cholinesterase enzymes, allowing the breakdown of acetylcholine. Military personnel are issued the combination in an autoinjector (e.g. ATNAA), for ease of use in stressful conditions.

Atropine is the standard anticholinergic drug used to manage the symptoms of nerve agent poisoning. It acts as an antagonist to muscarinic acetylcholine receptors, blocking the effects of excess acetylcholine. Some synthetic anticholinergics, such as biperiden, may counteract the central symptoms of nerve agent poisoning more effectively than atropine, since they pass the blood–brain barrier better. While these drugs will save the life of a person affected by nerve agents, that person may be incapacitated briefly or for an extended period, depending on the extent of exposure. The endpoint of atropine administration is the clearing of bronchial secretions.

Pralidoxime chloride (also known as 2-PAMCl) is the most commonly used oxime used to treat nerve agent poisoning. Rather than counteracting the initial effects of the nerve agent on the nervous system as does atropine, pralidoxime chloride reactivates the poisoned enzyme (acetylcholinesterase) by scavenging the phosphoryl group attached on the functional hydroxyl group of the enzyme, counteracting the nerve agent itself. Revival of acetylcholinesterase with pralidoxime chloride works more effectively on nicotinic receptors while blocking acetylcholine receptors with atropine is more effective on muscarinic receptors.

Anticonvulsants, such as diazepam, may be administered to manage seizures, improving long term prognosis and reducing risk of brain damage. This is not usually self-administered as its use is for actively seizing patients.

=== Long-lasting effects ===
Nerve agents cause long-lasting oxidative stress, neuroinflammation, and brain cell damage, which can result in severe neurological and psychiatric impairments. In people exposed to nerve agents, serum and erythrocyte acetylcholinesterase in the long-term are noticeably lower than normal and tend to be lower the worse the persisting symptoms are. Applying atropine and oxime as soon as possible after the poisoning helps prevent stronger development of the negative effects, but those treatments are not fully effective on their own, and complications can occur even after a successful standard treatment.

Victims of the Matsumoto sarin attack and Tokyo subway sarin attack have been successfully treated against the poisoning, but showed persistent degradation of brain function for years to come, with one victim of the Tokyo attack dying from sarin poisoning in 2020, 25 years after sarin exposure.

=== Countermeasures ===
Pyridostigmine bromide was used by the US military in the first Gulf War as a pretreatment for soman as it increased the median lethal dose. It is only effective if taken prior to exposure and in conjunction with Atropine and Pralidoxime, issued in the Mark I NAAK autoinjector, and is ineffective against other nerve agents. While it reduces fatality rates, there is an increased risk of brain damage; this can be mitigated by administration of an anticonvulsant. Evidence suggests that the use of pyridostigmine may be responsible for some of the symptoms of Gulf War syndrome.

Butyrylcholinesterase is under development by the U.S. Department of Defense as a prophylactic countermeasure against organophosphate nerve agents. It binds nerve agent in the bloodstream before the poison can exert effects in the nervous system.

Both purified acetylcholinesterase and butyrylcholinesterase have demonstrated success in animal studies as "biological scavengers" (and universal targets) to provide stoichiometric protection against the entire spectrum of organophosphate nerve agents. Butyrylcholinesterase currently is the preferred enzyme for development as a pharmaceutical drug primarily because it is a naturally circulating human plasma protein (superior pharmacokinetics) and its larger active site compared with acetylcholinesterase may permit greater flexibility for future design and improvement of butyrylcholinesterase to act as a nerve agent scavenger.

== Classes ==
There are two main classes of nerve agents. The members of the two classes share similar properties and are given both a common name (such as Sarin) and a two-character NATO identifier (such as GB).

=== G-series ===
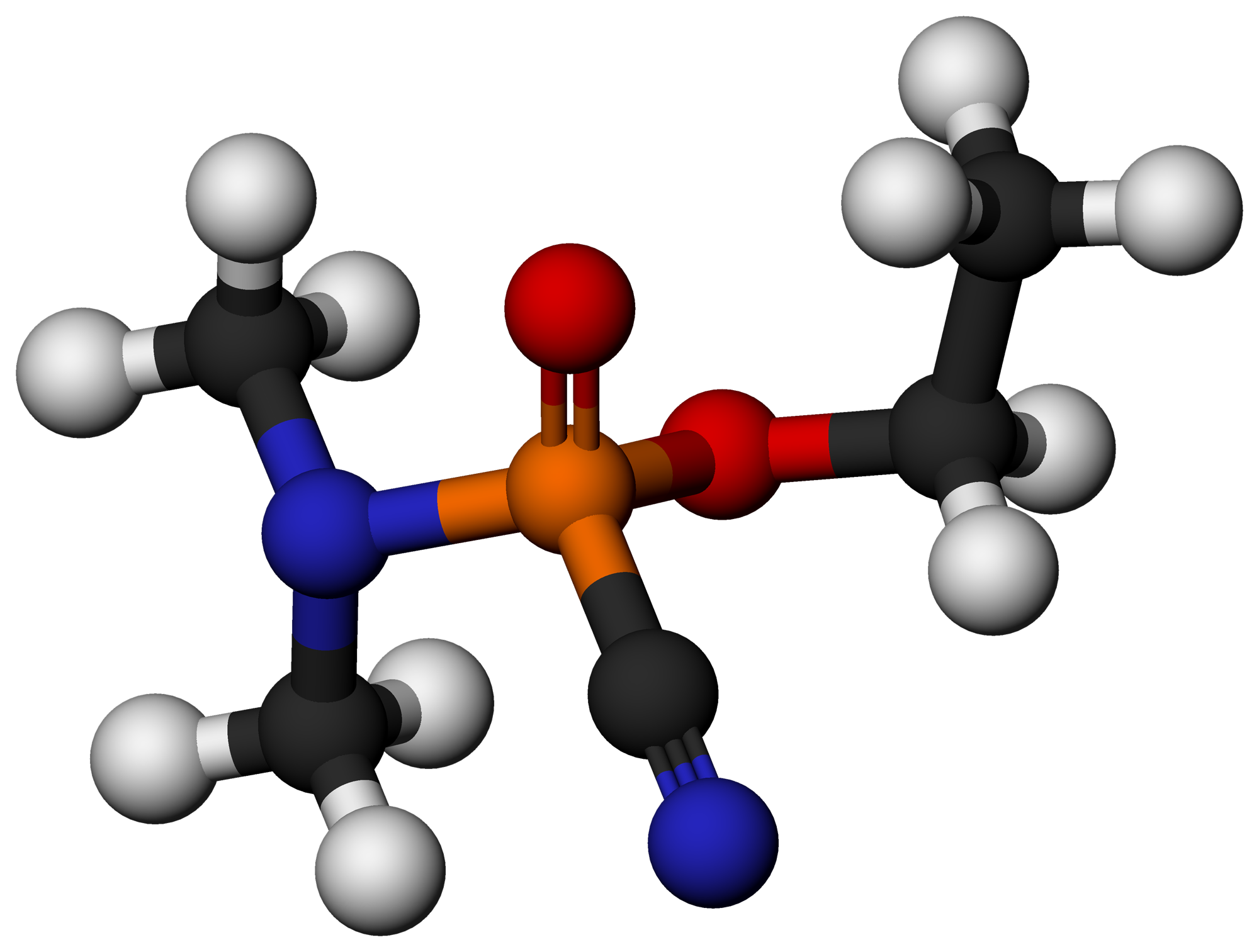
Chemical form of the nerve agent Tabun, the first ever synthesized.

The G series of nerve agents.

The G-series is thus named because German scientists first synthesized them. G series agents are known as non-persistent, meaning that they evaporate shortly after release, and do not remain active in the dispersal area for very long. All of the compounds in this class were discovered and synthesized during or prior to World War II, by scientists working at IG Farben - a company which played an instrumental role in The Holocaust.

This series is the first and oldest family of nerve agents. The first nerve agent ever synthesized was GA (Tabun) in 1936. GB (Sarin) was discovered next in 1939, followed by GD (Soman) in 1944, and finally GF (Cyclosarin) in 1949. GB was the only G agent that was fielded by the US as a munition, in rockets, aerial bombs, and artillery shells.

G agents are characterized by being almost industrially insoluble, as they are difficult to produce on a large scale at the same time in high purity and stability. The most problematic component is DF (Methylphosphonyl difluoride) and the fluoride ion, with the United States being the only country capable of producing this precursor on a large scale and in a pure and stabilized form. Another component, which has fallen into disuse, is dimethylphosphoramido dicyanidate, which is equally problematic.

Replacing the fluorine in methylphosphonofluoridates causes a sharp drop in toxicity, as does dimethylphosphoramidocyanidates. The stabilization of these compounds was focused on finding leaving groups that would replace the fluorine and cyanide ions - with the exception of phosphocholine-derived V agents -, this led to the development of some V agents, when the output group was bulky.

=== V-series ===
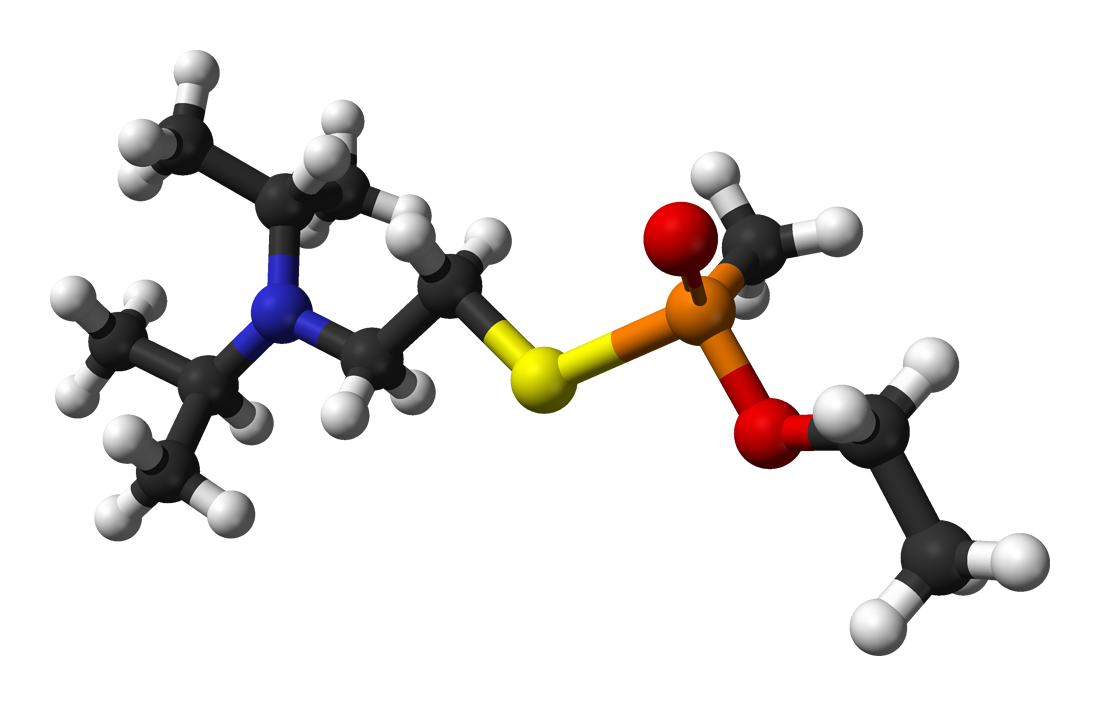
Chemical form of the nerve agent VX.

The V series of nerve agents.

The V-series is the second family of nerve agents and contains five well known members: VE, VG, VM, VR, and VX, along with several more obscure analogues.

The most studied agent in this family, VX (it is thought that the "X" in its name comes from its overlapping isopropyl radicals), was invented in the 1950s at Porton Down in Wiltshire, England. Ranajit Ghosh, a chemist at the Plant Protection Laboratories of Imperial Chemical Industries (ICI) was investigating a class of organophosphate compounds (organophosphate esters of substituted aminoethanethiols). Like Schrader, Ghosh found that they were quite effective pesticides. In 1953 and 1954, ICI conducted field trials, intending to market the material as an acaricide with the common name amiton. Development was halted, as it was too toxic for safe use. The toxicity did not escape military notice and some of the more toxic materials had been sent to Porton Down for evaluation. After the evaluation was complete, several members of this class of compounds became a new group of nerve agents, the V agents (depending on the source, the V stands for Victory, Venomous, or Viscous). The best known of these is probably VX, with VR ("Russian V-gas") coming a close second (amiton is largely forgotten as VG, with G probably coming from "G"hosh). All of the V-agents are persistent agents, meaning that these agents do not degrade or wash away easily and can therefore remain on clothes and other surfaces for long periods. In use, this allows the V-agents to be used to blanket terrain to guide or curtail the movement of enemy ground forces. The consistency of these agents is similar to oil; as a result, the contact hazard for V-agents is primarily – but not exclusively – dermal. VX was the only V-series agent that was fielded by the US as a munition, in rockets, artillery shells, airplane spray tanks, and landmines.

Analyzing the structure of thirteen V agents, the standard composition, which makes a compound enter this group, is the absence of halides. It is clear that many agricultural pesticides can be considered as V agents if they are notoriously toxic. The agent is not required to be a phosphonate and presents a dialkylaminoethyl group. The toxicity requirement is waived as the VT agent and its salts (VT-1 and VT-2) are "non-toxic". Replacing the sulfur atom with selenium increases the toxicity of the agent by orders of magnitude.

=== Novichok agents ===
The Novichok (Russian: Новичо́к, "newcomer") agents, a series of organophosphate compounds, were developed in the Soviet Union and in Russia from the mid-1960s to the 1990s. The Novichok program aimed to develop and manufacture highly deadly chemical weapons that were unknown to the West. The new agents were designed to be undetectable by standard NATO chemical-detection equipment and overcome contemporary chemical-protective equipment.

In addition to the newly developed "third generation" weapons, binary versions of several Soviet agents were developed and were designated as "Novichok" agents.

=== Carbamates ===
Contrary to some claims, not all nerve agents are organophosphates. The starting compound studied by the United States was the carbamate EA-1464, of notorious toxicity. Compounds similar in structure and effect to EA-1464 formed a large group, including compounds such as EA-3990 and EA-4056. The Family Practice Notebook claims carbamate-based nerve agents can be three times as toxic as VX. Both the United States and the Soviet Union developed carbamate-based nerve agents during the Cold War. Carbamate-based nerve agents are sometimes grouped in academic literature with Fourth Generation Novichok agents, as they were added to the CWC schedule on banned agents at the same time, despite their significant differences in chemical makeup and mechanisms of action. Carbamate-based nerve agents have been identified as Schedule 1 Nerve Agents, the highest classification possible under the CWC, reserved for agents with no identified alternate use, and those that can cause the most harm.

=== Insecticides ===
Some insecticides, including carbamates and organophosphates such as dichlorvos, carbofuran and parathion, are nerve agents. The metabolism of insects is sufficiently different from mammals that these compounds have little effect on humans and other mammals at proper doses, but there is considerable concern about the effects of long-term exposure to these chemicals by farm workers and animals alike. At high enough doses, acute toxicity and death can occur through the same mechanism as other nerve agents. Some insecticides such as demeton, dimefox and paraoxon are sufficiently toxic to humans that they have been withdrawn from agricultural use, and were at one stage investigated for potential military applications. Paraoxon was allegedly used as an assassination weapon by the apartheid South African government as part of Project Coast. Organophosphate pesticide poisoning is a major cause of disability in many developing countries and is often the preferred method of suicide.

Several pesticides were investigated as candidate chemical warfare agents, only when they demonstrated high activity in mammals. Paraoxon, mevinphos, and armine were the first agents investigated as chemical warfare agents, candidates G.

== Methods of dissemination ==
Many methods exist for spreading nerve agents such as:

- uncontrolled aerosol munitions
- smoke generation
- explosive dissemination
- atomizers, humidifiers and foggers

The method chosen will depend on the physical properties of the nerve agent(s) used, the nature of the target, and the achievable level of sophistication.

== History ==
=== Discovery ===
This first class of nerve agents, the G-series, was accidentally discovered in Germany on 23 December 1936, by a research team headed by Gerhard Schrader working for IG Farben. Since 1934, Schrader had been working in a laboratory in Leverkusen to develop new types of insecticides for IG Farben. While working toward his goal of improved insecticide, Schrader experimented with numerous compounds, eventually leading to the preparation of Tabun.

In experiments, Tabun was extremely potent against insects: as little as 5 ppm of Tabun killed all the leaf lice he used in his initial experiment. In January 1937, Schrader observed the effects of nerve agents on human beings first-hand when a drop of Tabun spilled onto a lab bench. Within minutes he and his laboratory assistant began to experience miosis (constriction of the pupils of the eyes), dizziness and severe shortness of breath. It took them three weeks to recover fully.

In 1935 the Nazi government had passed a decree that required all inventions of possible military significance to be reported to the Ministry of War, so in May 1937 Schrader sent a sample of Tabun to the chemical warfare (CW) section of the Army Weapons Office in Berlin-Spandau. Schrader was summoned to the Wehrmacht chemical lab in Berlin to give a demonstration, after which Schrader's patent application and all related research was classified as secret. Colonel Rüdiger, head of the CW section, ordered the construction of new laboratories for the further investigation of Tabun and other organophosphate compounds and Schrader soon moved to a new laboratory at Wuppertal-Elberfeld in the Ruhr valley to continue his research in secret throughout World War II. The compound was initially codenamed Le-100 and later Trilon-83.

Sarin was discovered by Schrader and his team in 1938 and named in honor of its discoverers: Gerhard Schrader, Otto Ambros, Gerhard Ritter, and Hans-Jürgen von der Linde. It was codenamed T-144 or Trilon-46. It was found to be more than ten times as potent as Tabun.

Soman was discovered by Richard Kuhn in 1944 as he worked with the existing compounds; the name is derived from either the Greek 'to sleep' or the Latin 'to bludgeon'. It was codenamed T-300.

Cyclosarin was also discovered during WWII but the details were lost and it was rediscovered in 1949.

The G-series naming system was created by the United States when it uncovered the German activities, labeling Tabun as GA (German Agent A), Sarin as GB and Soman as GD. Ethyl Sarin was tagged GE and Cyclosarin as GF.

=== During World War II ===
In 1939, a pilot plant for Tabun production was set up at Munster-Lager, on Lüneburg Heath near the German Army proving grounds at Raubkammer. In January 1940, construction began on a secret plant, code named "Hochwerk" (High factory), for the production of Tabun at Dyhernfurth an der Oder (now Brzeg Dolny in Poland), on the Oder River 40 km (25 mi) from Breslau (now Wrocław) in Silesia.

The plant was large, covering an area of 2.4 by 0.8 km (1.49 by 0.50 mi) and was completely self-contained, synthesizing all intermediates as well as the final product, Tabun. The factory even had an underground plant for filling munitions, which were then stored at Krappitz (now Krapkowice) in Upper Silesia. The plant was operated by Anorgana GmbH, a subsidiary of IG Farben, as were all other chemical weapon agent production plants in Germany at the time.

Because of the plant's deep secrecy and the difficult nature of the production process, it took from January 1940 until June 1942 for the plant to become fully operational. Many of Tabun's chemical precursors were so corrosive that reaction chambers not lined with quartz or silver soon became useless. Tabun itself was so hazardous that the final processes had to be performed while enclosed in double glass-lined chambers with a stream of pressurized air circulating between the walls.

Three thousand German nationals were employed at Hochwerk, all equipped with respirators and clothing constructed of a poly-layered rubber/cloth/rubber sandwich that was destroyed after the tenth wearing. Despite all precautions, there were over 300 accidents before production even began and at least ten workers died during the two and a half years of operation. Some incidents cited in A Higher Form of Killing: The Secret History of Chemical and Biological Warfare are as follows:

- Four pipe fitters had liquid Tabun drain onto them and died before their rubber suits could be removed.
- A worker had two liters of Tabun pour down the neck of his rubber suit. He died within two minutes.
- Seven workers were hit in the face with a stream of Tabun of such force that the liquid was forced behind their respirators. Only two survived despite resuscitation measures.

The plant produced between 10 000 and 30 000 tons of Tabun before its capture by the Soviet Army and moved, probably to Dzerzhinsk, USSR.

In 1940 the German Army Weapons Office ordered the mass production of Sarin for wartime use. A number of pilot plants were built and a high-production facility was under construction (but was not finished) by the end of World War II. Estimates for total Sarin production by Nazi Germany range from 500 kg to 10 tons.

During that time, German intelligence believed that the Allies also knew of these compounds, assuming that information about them was being suppressed because these compounds were not discussed in the Allies' scientific journals. Though Sarin, Tabun and Soman were incorporated into artillery shells, the German government ultimately decided not to use nerve agents against Allied targets. The Allies did not learn of these agents until shells filled with them were captured towards the end of the war. German forces used chemical warfare against partisans during the Battle of the Kerch Peninsula in 1942, but did not use any nerve agent.

This is detailed in Joseph Borkin's book The Crime and Punishment of IG Farben:

Speer, who was strongly opposed to the introduction of Tabun, flew Otto Ambros, I.G.'s authority on poison gas as well as synthetic rubber, to the meeting. Hitler asked Ambros, "What is the other side doing about poison gas?" Ambros explained that the enemy, because of its greater access to ethylene, probably had a greater capacity to produce mustard gas than Germany did. Hitler interrupted to explain that he was not referring to traditional poison gases: "I understand that the countries with petroleum are in a position to make more [mustard gas], but Germany has a special gas, Tabun. In this we have a monopoly in Germany." He specifically wanted to know whether the enemy had access to such a gas and what it was doing in this area. To Hitler's disappointment Ambros replied, "I have justified reasons to assume that Tabun, too, is known abroad. I know that Tabun was publicized as early as 1902, that Sarin was patented and that these substances appeared in patents. " (...)Ambros was informing Hitler of an extraordinary fact about one of Germany's most secret weapons. The essential nature of Tabun and Sarin had already been disclosed in the technical journals as far back as 1902 and I.G. had patented both products in 1937 and 1938. Ambros then warned Hitler that if Germany used Tabun, it must face the possibility that the Allies could produce this gas in much larger quantities. Upon receiving this discouraging report, Hitler abruptly left the meeting. The nerve gases would not be used, for the time being at least, although they would continue to be produced and tested.

— Joseph Borkin, The Crime and Punishment of IG Farben

=== Post–World War II ===
Since World War II, Iraq's use of mustard gas against Iranian troops and Kurds (Iran–Iraq War of 1980–1988) has been the only large-scale use of any chemical weapons. On the scale of the single Kurdish village of Halabja within its own territory, Iraqi forces did expose the populace to some kind of chemical weapons, possibly mustard gas and most likely nerve agents.

Operatives of the Aum Shinrikyo religious group made and used Sarin several times on Japanese citizens, most notably in the Tokyo subway sarin attack.

In the Gulf War, no nerve agents (nor other chemical weapons) were used, but a number of U.S. and UK personnel were exposed to them when the Khamisiyah chemical depot was destroyed. This and the widespread use of anticholinergic drugs as a protective treatment against any possible nerve gas attack have been proposed as a possible cause of Gulf War syndrome.

Sarin gas was deployed in a 2013 attack on Ghouta during the Syrian Civil War, killing several hundred people. Most governments contend that forces loyal to President Bashar al-Assad deployed the gas; however, the Syrian Government has denied responsibility.

On 13 February 2017, the nerve agent VX was used in the assassination of Kim Jong-nam, half-brother of the North Korean leader Kim Jong-un, at Kuala Lumpur International Airport in Malaysia.

On 4 March 2018, a former Russian agent (who was convicted of high treason but allowed to live in the United Kingdom via a spy swap agreement), Sergei Skripal, and his daughter, who was visiting from Moscow, were both poisoned by a Novichok nerve agent in the English city of Salisbury. They survived, and were subsequently released from hospital. In addition, a Wiltshire Police officer, Nick Bailey, was exposed to the substance. He was one of the first to respond to the incident. Twenty-one members of the public received medical treatment following exposure to the nerve agent. Despite this, only Bailey and the Skripals remained in critical condition. On 11 March 2018, Public Health England issued advice for the other people believed to have been in the Mill pub (the location where the attack is believed to have been carried out) or the nearby Zizzi Restaurant. On 12 March 2018, British Prime Minister Theresa May stated that the substance used was a Novichok nerve agent.

On 30 June 2018, two British nationals, Charlie Rowley and Dawn Sturgess, were poisoned by a Novichok nerve agent of the same kind that was used in the Skripal poisoning, which Rowley had found in a discarded perfume bottle and gifted to Sturgess. Whilst Rowley survived, Sturgess died on 8 July. Metropolitan Police believe that the poisoning was not a targeted attack, but a result of the way the nerve agent was disposed of after the poisoning in Salisbury.

=== Ocean disposal ===
In 1972, the United States Congress banned the practice of disposing chemical weapons into the ocean. Thirty-two thousand tons of nerve and mustard agents had already been dumped into the ocean waters off the United States by the U.S. Army, primarily as part of Operation CHASE. According to a 1998 report by William Brankowitz, a deputy project manager in the U.S. Army Chemical Materials Agency, the Army created at least 26 chemical weapons dump sites in the ocean off at least 11 states on both the west and east coasts. Due to poor records, they currently only know the rough whereabouts of half of them.

There is currently a lack of scientific data regarding the ecological and health effects of this dumping, but there have been a few incidents of chemical weapons washing ashore or being accidentally retrieved, for example during dredging or trawl fishing operations.

== Detection ==
=== Detection of gaseous nerve agents ===
The methods of detecting gaseous nerve agents include but are not limited to the following.

==== Laser photoacoustic spectroscopy ====
Laser photoacoustic spectroscopy (LPAS) is a method that has been used to detect nerve agents in the air. In this method, laser light is absorbed by gaseous matter. This causes a heating/cooling cycle and changes in pressure. Sensitive microphones convey sound waves that result from the pressure changes. Scientists at the U.S. Army Research Laboratory engineered an LPAS system that can detect multiple trace amounts of toxic gases in one air sample.

This technology contained three lasers modulated to different frequency, each producing a different sound wave tone. The different wavelengths of light were directed into a sensor referred to as the photoacoustic cell. Within the cell were the vapors of different nerve agents. The traces of each nerve agent had a signature effect on the "loudness" of the lasers' sound wave tones. Some overlap of nerve agents' effects did occur in the acoustic results. However, it was predicted that specificity would increase as additional lasers with unique wavelengths were added. Yet, too many lasers set to different wavelengths could result in overlap of absorption spectra. Citation LPAS technology can identify gases in parts per billion (ppb) concentrations.

The following nerve agent simulants have been identified with this multiwavelength LPAS:

- dimethyl methyl phosphonate (DMMP)
- diethyl methyl phosphonate (DEMP)
- diisopropyl methyl phosphonate (DIMP)
- dimethylpolysiloxane (DIME), triethyl phosphate (TEP)
- tributyl phosphate (TBP)
- two volatile organic compounds (VOCs)
- acetone (ACE)
- isopropanol (ISO), used to construct Sarin

Other gases and air contaminants identified with LPAS include:

- CO_{2} Carbon dioxide
- Benzene
- Formaldehyde
- Acetaldehyde
- Ammonia
- NOx Nitrogen oxide
- SO_{2} Sulphur oxide
- Ethylene Glycol
- TATP
- TNT

==== Non-dispersive infrared ====
Non-dispersive infrared techniques have been reported to be used for gaseous nerve agent detection.

==== IR absorption ====
Traditional IR absorption has been reported to detect gaseous nerve agents.

==== Fourier transform infrared spectroscopy ====
Fourier transform infrared (FTIR) spectroscopy has been reported to detect gaseous nerve agents.

== Sources ==
- Mager, Peter (1984). Multidimensional Pharmacochemistry. doi:10.1016/B978-0-124-65020-6.X5001-5. ISBN 978-0-12-465020-6.
- Sidell FR (1997). Medical aspects of chemical and biological warfare. Borden Institute, Walter Reed Army Medical Center. ISBN 978-99973-2-091-9.
