= Methylphosphonyl difluoride =

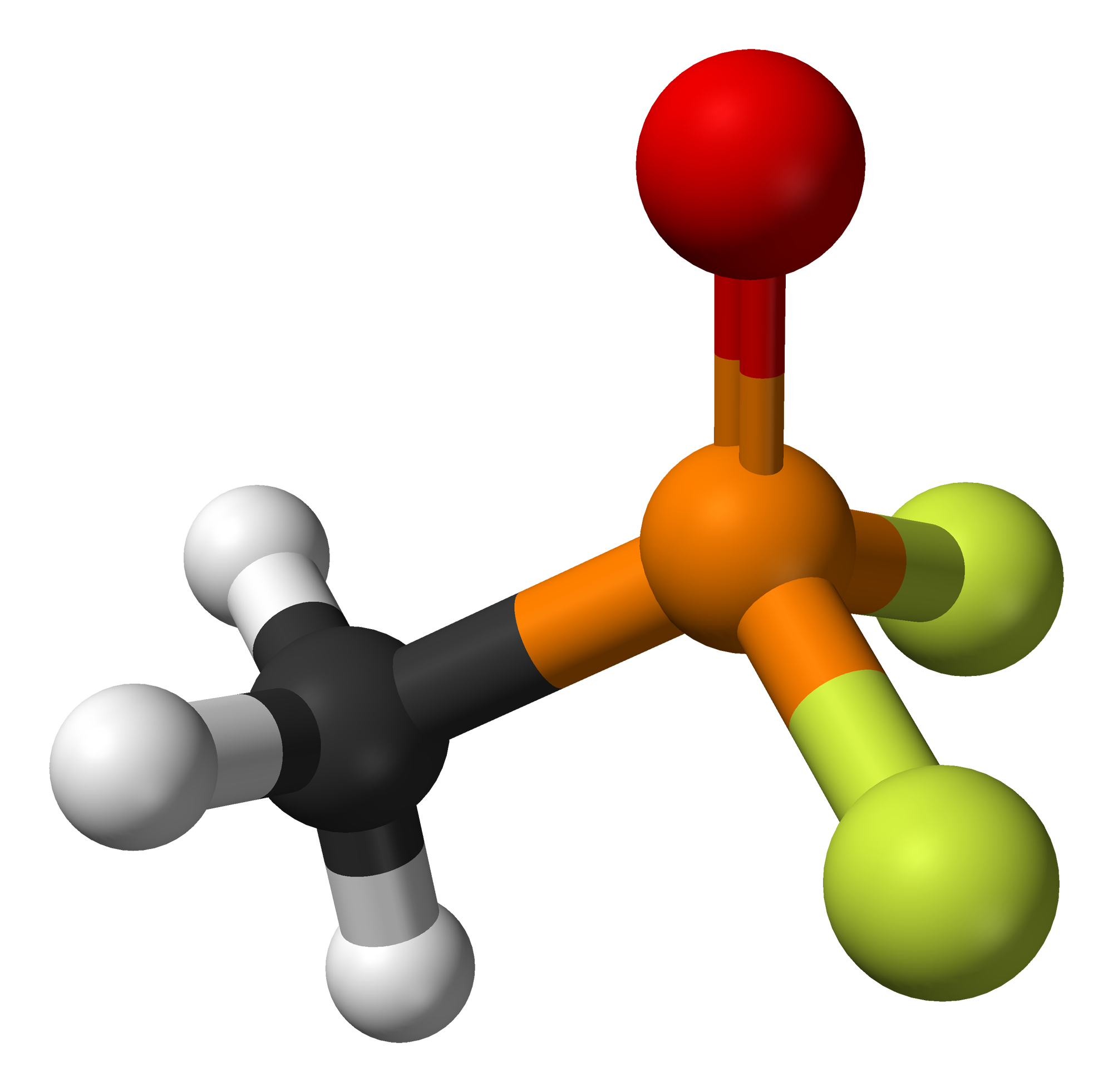

Names
- Preferred IUPAC name Methylphosphonic difluoride
- Other names Methylphosphonyl difluoride Methylphosphonoyl difluoride, EA-1251

Identifiers
CAS Number	676-99-3
3D model (JSmol)	Interactive image
Beilstein Reference	4-04-00-03508
ChemSpider	62813
MeSH	difluoride Methylphosphonic difluoride
PubChem CID	69610
UNII	Z7V517240K
CompTox Dashboard (EPA)	DTXSID5060980
- InChI: InChI=1S/CH3F2OP/c1-5(2,3)4/h1H3 Key: PQIOSYKVBBWRRI-UHFFFAOYSA-N
- SMILES: CP(F)(F)=O

Properties
Chemical formula	CH_{3}POF_{2}
Molar mass	100.00
Appearance	Colorless liquid
Odor	Pungent, acid-like
Density	1.359 g/mL (77°F)
Melting point	−37 °C; −35 °F; 236 K
Boiling point	100 °C; 212 °F; 373 K
Solubility in water	Decomposes
Vapor pressure	36 mmHg (77°F)

Hazards
- Occupational safety and health (OHS/OSH)
Main hazards	Corrosive, toxic
- Except where otherwise noted, data are given for materials in their standard state (at 25 °C [77 °F], 100 kPa). Infobox references

Methylphosphonyl difluoride (DF), also known as EA-1251 or difluoro, is a chemical weapon precursor. Its chemical formula is CH_{3}POF_{2}. It is a Schedule 1 substance under the Chemical Weapons Convention. It is used for production of sarin and soman as a component of binary chemical weapons; an example is the M687 artillery shell, where it was used together with a mixture of isopropyl alcohol and isopropyl amine, producing sarin.

== Preparation ==
Methylphosphonyl difluoride can be prepared by reacting methylphosphonyl dichloride with hydrogen fluoride (HF) or sodium fluoride (NaF).

== Safety ==
Methylphosphonyl difluoride is both reactive and corrosive. It is absorbed through skin and causes burns and mild nerve agent symptoms. It reacts with water, producing HF fumes and methylphosphonic acid as a result. It is also capable of corroding glass.

== Significance in international relations ==
In 2013–2014, the stockpile of chemicals covered by the CWC was removed from Syria and destroyed. Of the stockpile, 581 tons (over 96%) of the stockpile was DF. It was destroyed by the U.S. Army on the MV Cape Ray by hydrolysis.
