= Methylphosphonic acid =

Identifiers
CAS Number	993-13-5
3D model (JSmol)	Interactive image
ChEBI	CHEBI:45129
ChemSpider	13220
ECHA InfoCard	100.012.370
EC Number	213-607-2
KEGG	C20396
MeSH	C032627
PubChem CID	13818
UNII	329W4YM10Z
CompTox Dashboard (EPA)	DTXSID5047748
- InChI: InChI=1S/CH5O3P/c1-5(2,3)4/h1H3,(H2,2,3,4) Key: YACKEPLHDIMKIO-UHFFFAOYSA-N; InChI=1/CH5O3P/c1-5(2,3)4/h1H3,(H2,2,3,4) Key: YACKEPLHDIMKIO-UHFFFAOYAB
- SMILES: CP(=O)(O)O

Properties
Chemical formula	CH_{5}O_{3}P
Molar mass	96.02
Appearance	White Solid
Melting point	105 to 107 °C (221 to 225 °F; 378 to 380 K)
- Except where otherwise noted, data are given for materials in their standard state (at 25 °C [77 °F], 100 kPa). Infobox references

Methylphosphonic acid is an organophosphorus compound with the chemical formula CH_{3}P(O)(OH)_{2}. The phosphorus center is tetrahedral and is bonded to a methyl group, two OH groups and an oxygen. Methylphosphonic acid is a white, non-volatile solid that is poorly soluble in organic solvent but soluble in water and common alcohols.

== Preparation ==
Methylphosphonic acid can be prepared from triethylphosphite by first using a Michaelis-Arbuzov reaction to generate the phosphorus(V) centre:

CH_{3}Cl + P(OC_{2}H_{5})_{3} → CH_{3}PO(OC_{2}H_{5})_{2} + C_{2}H_{5}Cl

The resulting dialkylphosphonate is then treated with chlorotrimethylsilane before hydrolysis of the siloxyphosphonate to generate the desired product.

CH_{3}PO(OC_{2}H_{5})_{2} + 2 Me_{3}SiCl → CH_{3}PO(OSiMe_{3})_{2} + 2 C_{2}H_{5}Cl

CH_{3}PO(OSiMe_{3})_{2} + 2H_{2}O → CH_{3}PO(OH)_{2} + 2 HOSiMe_{3}

The reaction pathway proceeds via the siloxyphosphonate intermediate due to the difficulty in directly hydrolysing dialkylphosphonates. Katritzky and co-workers published a one-pot synthesis of methylphosphonic acid in 1989.

== See also ==
- Sarin
