= Chemical warfare =

Using poison gas or other toxins in war

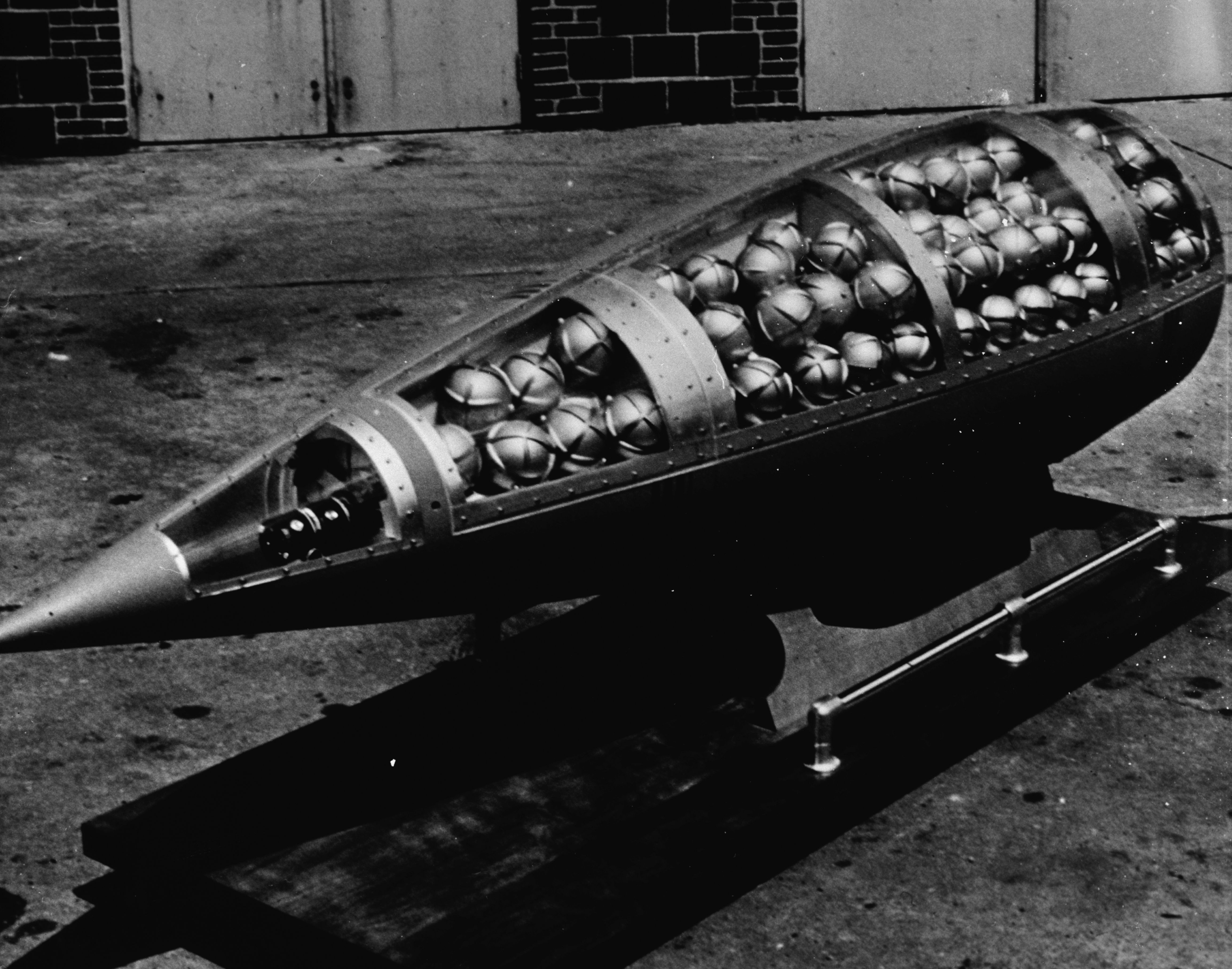
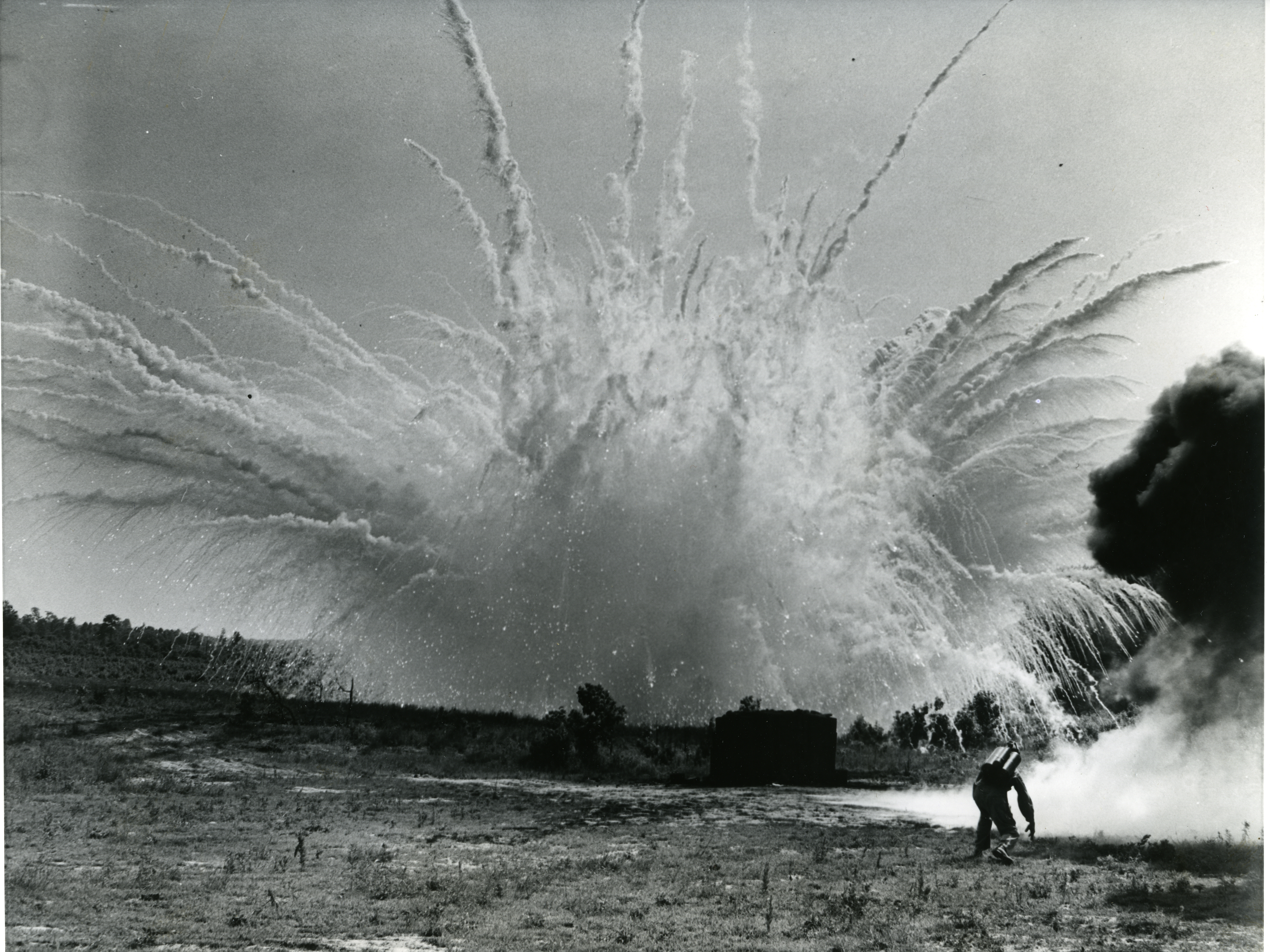
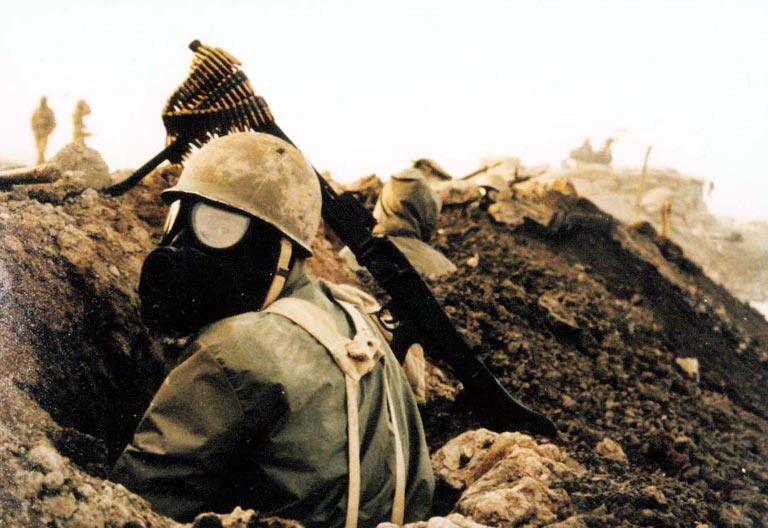
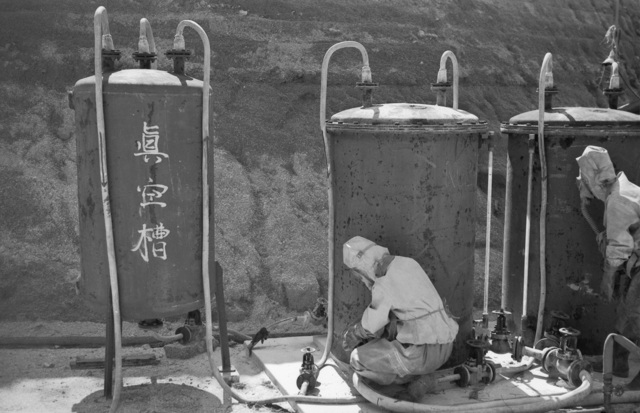
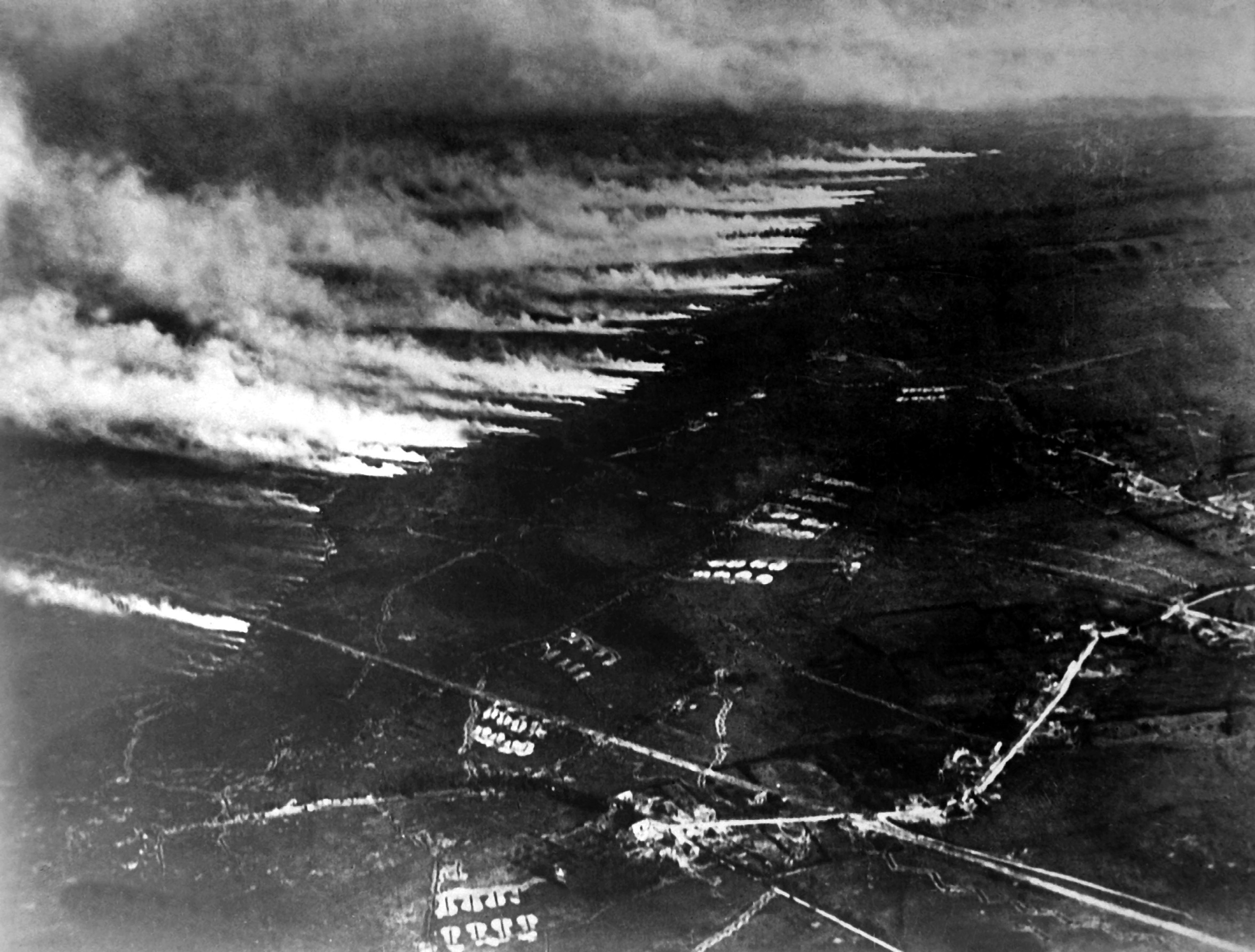
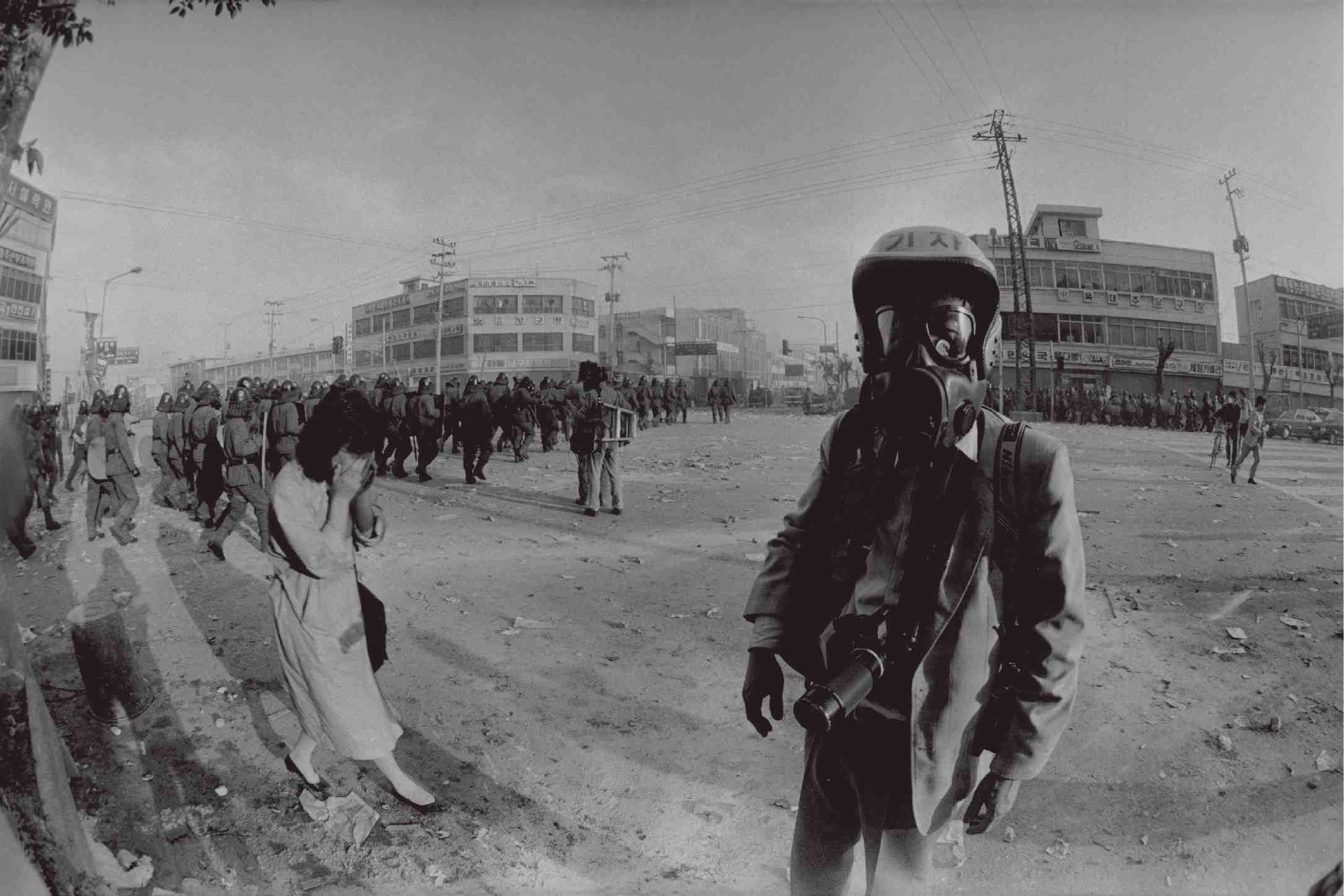
From top, left to right
- Sarin bomblets for use on the Honest John rocket
- White phosphorus explosion during training at Edgewood Arsenal
- Iranian soldier wearing gas mask during the Iran–Iraq War
- Postwar disposal of mustard gas produced by Japan on Ōkunoshima during World War II
- French gas attack in Flanders, World War I
- Tear gas used in Incheon during the June Democratic Struggle

Chemical warfare (CW) involves using the toxic properties of chemical substances as weapons. This type of warfare is distinct from nuclear warfare, biological warfare and radiological warfare, which together make up CBRN, the military acronym for chemical, biological, radiological, and nuclear (warfare or weapons), all of which are considered "weapons of mass destruction" (WMDs), a term that contrasts with conventional weapons.

The use of chemical weapons in international armed conflicts is prohibited under international humanitarian law by the 1925 Geneva Protocol and the Hague Conventions of 1899 and 1907. The 1993 Chemical Weapons Convention prohibits signatories from acquiring, stockpiling and using chemical weapons in all circumstances except for very limited purposes (research, medical, pharmaceutical or protective).

== Definition ==
Chemical warfare is different from the use of conventional weapons or nuclear weapons because the destructive effects of chemical weapons are not primarily due to any explosive force. The offensive use of living organisms (such as anthrax) is considered biological warfare rather than chemical warfare; however, the use of nonliving toxic products produced by living organisms (e.g. toxins such as botulinum toxin, ricin, and saxitoxin) is considered chemical warfare under the provisions of the Chemical Weapons Convention (CWC). Under this convention, any toxic chemical, regardless of its origin, is considered a chemical weapon unless it is used for purposes that are not prohibited (an important legal definition known as the General Purpose Criterion).

About 70 different chemicals have been used or were stockpiled as chemical warfare agents during the 20th century. The entire class, known as Lethal Unitary Chemical Agents and Munitions, has been scheduled for elimination by the CWC.

Under the convention, chemicals that are toxic enough to be used as chemical weapons, or that may be used to manufacture such chemicals, are divided into three groups according to their purpose and treatment:

- Schedule 1 – Have few, if any, legitimate uses. These may only be produced or used for research, medical, pharmaceutical or protective purposes (i.e. testing of chemical weapons sensors and protective clothing). Examples include nerve agents, ricin, lewisite and mustard gas. Any production over 100 grams (3.5 oz) must be reported to the Organisation for the Prohibition of Chemical Weapons (OPCW) and a country can have a stockpile of no more than one tonne of these chemicals.
- Schedule 2 – Have no large-scale industrial uses, but may have legitimate small-scale uses. Examples include dimethyl methylphosphonate, a precursor to sarin also used as a flame retardant, and thiodiglycol, a precursor chemical used in the manufacture of mustard gas but also widely used as a solvent in inks.
- Schedule 3 – Have legitimate large-scale industrial uses. Examples include phosgene and chloropicrin. Both have been used as chemical weapons but phosgene is an important precursor in the manufacture of plastics, and chloropicrin is used as a fumigant. The OPCW must be notified of, and may inspect, any plant producing more than 30 tons per year.

Chemical weapons are divided into three categories:

- Category 1 – based on Schedule 1 substances
- Category 2 – based on non-Schedule 1 substances
- Category 3 – devices and equipment designed to use chemical weapons, without the substances themselves

== History ==
Simple chemical weapons were used sporadically throughout antiquity and into the Industrial Age. It was not until the 19th century that the modern conception of chemical warfare emerged, as various scientists and nations proposed the use of asphyxiating or poisonous gases.

John Singer Sargent's iconic World War I painting: Gassed, showing blind casualties on a battlefield after a mustard gas attack

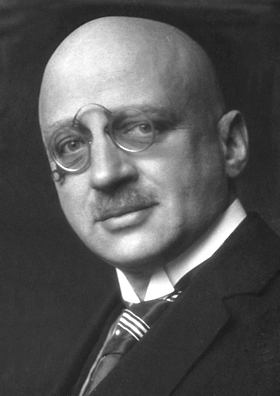
Fritz Haber is considered the "father of chemical warfare" for his years of pioneering work developing and weaponizing chlorine and other poisonous gases during World War I.

Multiple international treaties were passed banning chemical weapons based upon the alarm of nations and scientists. This however did not prevent the extensive use of chemical weapons in World War I. Chlorine gas, among other chemicals, was used by both the Allied and Central powers to try to break the stalemate of trench warfare. In most cases the gases used did not kill, but instead incapacitated or caused permanent or temporary injuries. Historians have reached a wide range of estimates on gas casualties, ranging from 500k to 1.3 million casualties directly caused by chemical warfare agents during the course of the war, of which 2-4% died. A minimum of around 1300 civilians were injured due to the use of the weapons, and at least around 4000 were injured during weapon production. Gas casualties were a small fraction of the overall human impact of the war, but the horrifying effects of such weapons gave them a strong psychological impact.

The interwar years saw the occasional use of chemical weapons during the Second Italo-Ethiopian War by the Italians, while the Japanese made use of chloroacetophenone to suppress a native rebellion in Formosa in 1930, and later made use of mustard gas, lewisite, and irritant agents during the Second Sino-Japanese War. The Chinese, often lacking protective gear such as gas masks, were usually forced to retreat against CW attacks.

=== World War II ===
Although significant effort went into the development and stockpiling of chemical weapons in World War II, they saw no battlefield use in the European Theatre. Nazi Germany dedicated much research to the development of nerve agents, but never used them even during the final defense of the fatherland. It has been suggested that Adolf Hitler's own experience with poison gas during WWI and fears that the Allies would retaliate with their own chemical weapons were the main reasons chemical weapons were never used by Nazi Germany. According to military historian Ian V. Hogg, the Germans were reluctant to use nerve agents since they couldn't find any defense or antidote for them. They also feared that the ban on scientific journals about organophosphates in Britain meant that the Allies also discovered nerve agents. In reality, they were unaware of the G-series until an ammunition dump captured in April 1945 was examined, while the ban on scientific publications was meant to prevent Axis nations from learning about advances on the development of insecticides and herbicides to boost food production; nonetheless, the Allies made comprehensive plans for defensive and retaliatory use of chemical weapons, and stockpiled large quantities.

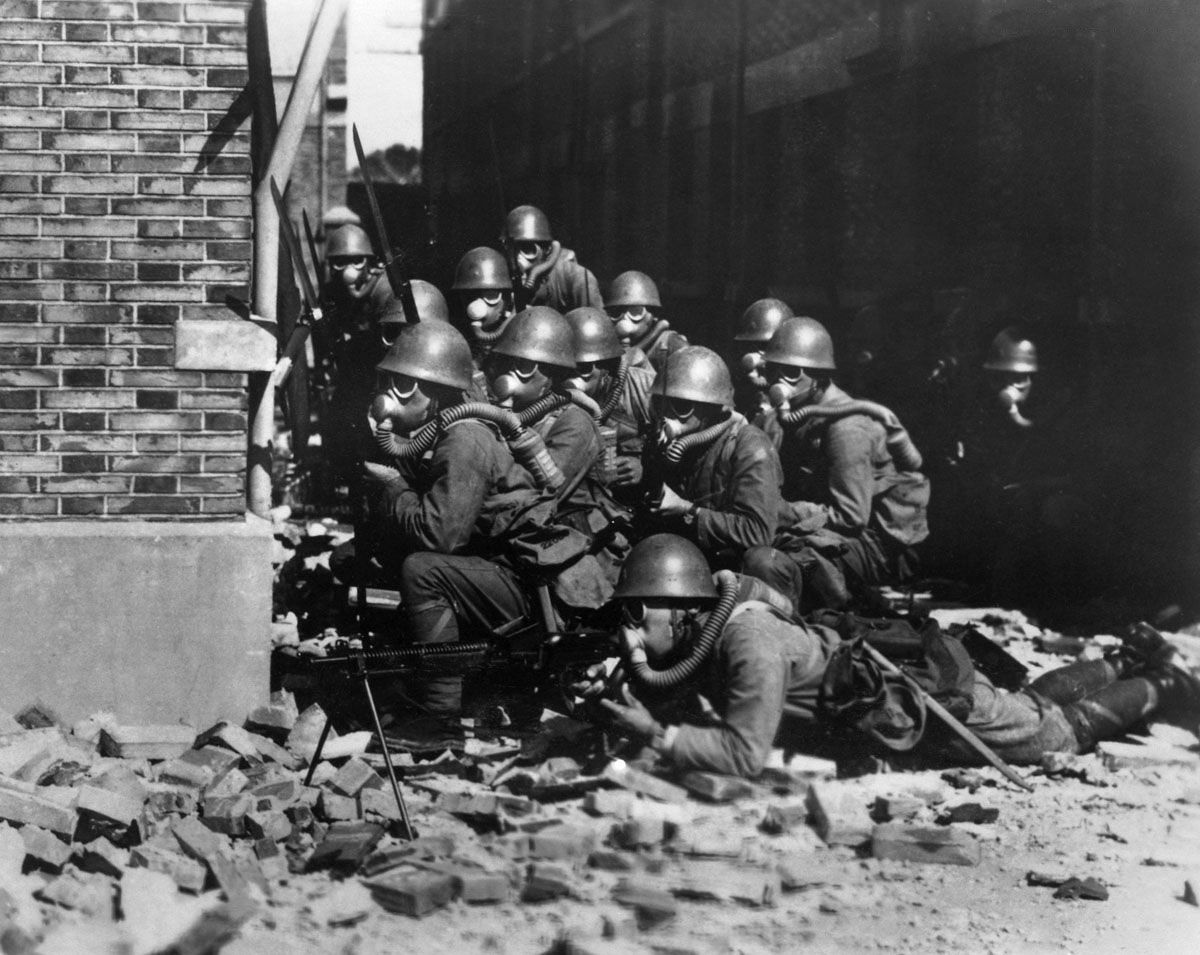
Japanese Special Naval Landing Forces with gas masks and rubber gloves during a chemical attack near Zhabei in the Battle of Shanghai

The Imperial Japanese Army, as part of the Axis, used chemical weapons in China and Burma until 1943. After President Roosevelt threatened the Japanese with retaliation in kind in 1942, they were forced to limit their usage in the Pacific Theatre. Chemical weapons were frequently used against both the Kuomintang and People's Liberation Army troops in China, while Unit 731 carried experiments with CW agents on prisoners of war in 1940 and 1943. By 1944, the Japanese gradually ceased production of chemical munitions in favor of conventional high-explosive and incendiary shells, while keeping a large enough stockpile for retaliatory use.

However, Nazi Germany extensively used poison gas against civilians, particularly Jews, in the Holocaust. Vast quantities of Zyklon B and carbon monoxide gas were used in the systematic extermination of some three million victims. This remains the deadliest use of poison gas in history.

=== Post-War ===
French forces frequently used chemical weapons, such as CN2D and sarin, against Algerian rebels during the Algerian War of Independence. The attacks killed and wounded thousands of Algerian civilians in 5,000 to 10,000 separate operations.

Small amounts of chemical agents were employed by Egyptian forces during the North Yemen civil war between 1963 and 1967, resulting hundreds of casualties. In one of the largest chemical attacks, the United States dropped over 90,000 tons of chemical agents, mostly Rainbow Herbicides but tear gas as well during the Vietnam War.

During the Iran–Iraq War, some 100,000 Iranian troops were casualties of Iraqi chemical weapons. Iraq also used mustard gas and nerve agents against the Kurdish population killing more than 5,000 people and injuring many in the 1988 Halabja chemical attack.

The Cuban intervention in Angola saw limited use of organophosphates.

On 22 September 1991, during the battle of Šibenik, Federal Yugoslav authorities accused Croatian forces of employing non-lethal chemical agents to storm the naval base in the city's harbour.

Terrorist groups have also used chemical weapons, notably in Japan in the 1990s, illustrated by the 1994 Matsumoto incident and the 1995 Tokyo subway sarin attack.

=== 21st century ===
==== Syria ====
The Ba'athist regime in Syria used sarin, chlorine, and mustard gas in numerous deadly chemical attacks against civilian populations during the Syrian civil war.

==== Russia ====
During the Russian invasion of Ukraine, Russia has been reported to deploy CS gas through K-51 grenades dropped by unmanned drones. On 13 December 2024, the Ukrainian military stated that over 4,800 incidents involving chemical weapons against Ukrainian forces have been recorded since the war began, which resulted in over 2,000 Ukrainian soldiers having been hospitalized, and 3 deaths. The use of gas was often hidden by heavy Russian "intense artillery, rocket, and bomb attacks”, forcing Ukrainian soldiers out of their positions. They saw less use of chemical gas in cold weather, as it reduced the effectiveness of the K-51 gas grenades. A 2024 US aid package to Ukraine included "nuclear, chemical and radiological protective equipment".

==== Sudan ====
Amnesty International published a report in September 2016 titled Scorched Earth, Poisoned Air, which documented at least 30 suspected chemical weapons attacks by the Sudanese Armed forces (SAF)in the Jebel Marra region of Darfur between January and September 2016. According to the report, an estimated 200–250 people, many of them children, were killed as a result of exposure to chemical agents.

Following the outbreak of armed conflict between the SAF and the Rapid Support Forces (RSF) in April 2023, further allegations emerged concerning the use of industrial chemicals as weapons. In May 2025, the United States Department of State determined that the SAF had used chemical weapons during 2024. This determination resulted in the imposition of sanctions under the Chemical and Biological Weapons Control and Warfare Elimination Act, including measures targeting SAF leadership such as Abdel Fattah al-Burhan.

In 2026, statements made at the Organisation for the Prohibition of Chemical Weapons (OPCW) maintained that Sudan remained in non‑compliance with the Chemical Weapons Convention, announcing sanctions and calling for immediate international inspections of suspected chemical‑weapons sites. In July 2026, Urwa al-Sadiq, the assistant head of the National Umma Party, accused the SAF-aligned authorities under General al-Burhan of implementing a policy of denial and "procedural maneuvering" to delay inspections, while systematically cordoning off and cleaning up affected zones—including Khartoum Hospital, the Sudan National Broadcasting Corporation facilities, and the al-Jaili refinery—to conceal physical evidence of chemical weapons usage.

== Technology ==
Chemical warfare technology timeline
Year	Agents	Dissemination	Protection	Detection
1914	Chlorine; Chloropicrin; Phosgene; Sulfur mustard	Wind dispersal	Gas masks, urine-soaked gauze	Smell
1918	Lewisite	Chemical shells	Gas mask Rosin oil clothing	Smell of geraniums
1920s		Projectiles with central bursters	CC-2 clothing
1930s	G-series nerve agents	Aircraft bombs		Blister agent detectors Color change paper
1940s		Missile warheads Spray tanks	Protective ointment (mustard); Collective protection Gas mask w/ whetlerite
1950s
1960s	V-series nerve agents	Aerodynamic	Gas mask w/ water supply	Nerve gas alarm
1970s
1980s		Binary munitions	Improved gas masks (protection, fit, comfort)	Laser detection
1990s	Novichok nerve agents

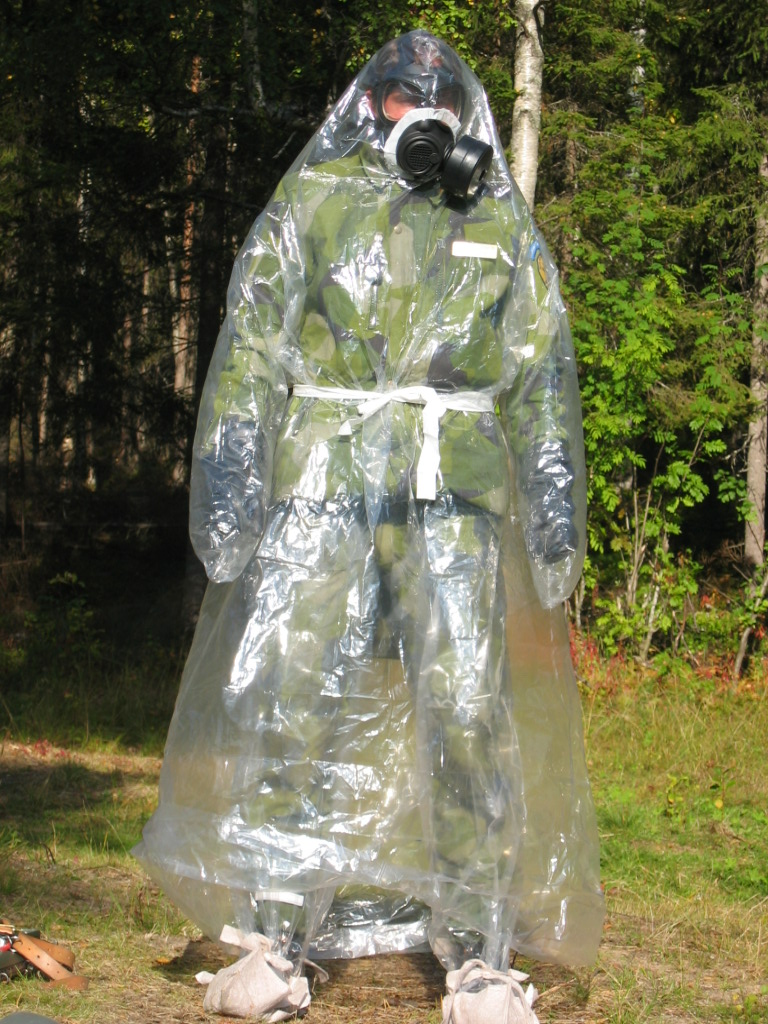
A Swedish Army soldier wearing a chemical agent protective suit (C-vätskeskydd) and protection mask (skyddsmask 90)

Although crude chemical warfare has been employed in many parts of the world for thousands of years, "modern" chemical warfare began during World War I – see Chemical weapons in World War I.

Initially, only well-known commercially available chemicals and their variants were used. These included chlorine and phosgene gas. The methods used to disperse these agents during battle were relatively unrefined and inefficient. Even so, casualties could be heavy, due to the mainly static troop positions which were characteristic features of trench warfare.

Germany, the first side to employ chemical warfare on the battlefield, simply opened canisters of chlorine upwind of the opposing side and let the prevailing winds do the dissemination. Soon after, the French modified artillery munitions to contain phosgene – a much more effective method that became the principal means of delivery.

Since the development of modern chemical warfare in World War I, nations have pursued research and development on chemical weapons that falls into four major categories: new and more deadly agents; more efficient methods of delivering agents to the target (dissemination); more reliable means of defense against chemical weapons; and more sensitive and accurate means of detecting chemical agents.

=== Chemical warfare agents ===
The chemical used in warfare is called a chemical warfare agent (CWA). About 70 different chemicals have been used or stockpiled as chemical warfare agents during the 20th and 21st centuries. These agents may be in liquid, gas or solid form. Liquid agents that evaporate quickly are said to be volatile or have a high vapor pressure. Many chemical agents are volatile organic compounds so they can be dispersed over a large region quickly.

The earliest target of chemical warfare agent research was not toxicity, but development of agents that can affect a target through the skin and clothing, rendering protective gas masks useless. In July 1917, the Germans employed sulfur mustard. Mustard agents easily penetrate leather and fabric to inflict painful burns on the skin.

Chemical warfare agents are divided into lethal and incapacitating categories. A substance is classified as incapacitating if less than 1/100 of the lethal dose causes incapacitation, e.g., through nausea or visual problems. The distinction between lethal and incapacitating substances is not fixed, but relies on a statistical average called the LD_{50}.

==== Persistency ====
Chemical warfare agents can be classified according to their persistency, a measure of the length of time that a chemical agent remains effective after dissemination. Chemical agents are classified as persistent or nonpersistent.

Agents classified as nonpersistent lose effectiveness after only a few minutes or hours or even only a few seconds. Purely gaseous agents such as chlorine are nonpersistent, as are highly volatile agents such as sarin. Tactically, nonpersistent agents are very useful against targets that are to be taken over and controlled very quickly.

Apart from the agent used, the delivery mode is very important. To achieve a nonpersistent deployment, the agent is dispersed into very small droplets comparable with the mist produced by an aerosol can. In this form not only the gaseous part of the agent (around 50%) but also the fine aerosol can be inhaled or absorbed through pores in the skin.

Modern doctrine requires very high concentrations almost instantly in order to be effective (one breath should contain a lethal dose of the agent). To achieve this, the primary weapons used would be rocket artillery or bombs and large ballistic missiles with cluster warheads. The contamination in the target area is only low or not existent and after four hours sarin or similar agents are not detectable anymore.

By contrast, persistent agents tend to remain in the environment for as long as several weeks, complicating decontamination. Defense against persistent agents requires shielding for extended periods of time. Nonvolatile liquid agents, such as blister agents and the oily VX nerve agent, do not easily evaporate into a gas, and therefore present primarily a contact hazard.

The droplet size used for persistent delivery goes up to 1 mm increasing the falling speed and therefore about 80% of the deployed agent reaches the ground, resulting in heavy contamination. Deployment of persistent agents is intended to constrain enemy operations by denying access to contaminated areas.

Possible targets include enemy flank positions (averting possible counterattacks), artillery regiments, command posts or supply lines. Because it is not necessary to deliver large quantities of the agent in a short period of time, a wide variety of weapons systems can be used.

A special form of persistent agents are thickened agents. These comprise a common agent mixed with thickeners to provide gelatinous, sticky agents. Primary targets for this kind of use include airfields, due to the increased persistency and difficulty of decontaminating affected areas.

==== Classes ====
Chemical weapons are agents that come in four categories: choking, blister, blood and nerve. The agents are organized into several categories according to the manner in which they affect the human body. The names and number of categories varies slightly from source to source, but in general, types of chemical warfare agents are as follows:

Classes of chemical weapon agents
Class of agent	Agent Names	Mode of Action	Signs and Symptoms	Rate of action	Persistency
Nerve	Cyclosarin (GF); Sarin (GB); Soman (GD); Tabun (GA); VX; VR; Some insecticides; Novichok agents	Inactivates enzyme acetylcholinesterase, preventing the breakdown of the neurotransmitter acetylcholine in the victim's synapses and causing both muscarinic and nicotinic effects	Miosis (pinpoint pupils); Blurred/dim vision; Headache; Nausea, vomiting, diarrhea; Copious secretions/sweating; Muscle twitching/fasciculations; Dyspnea; Seizures; Loss of consciousness	Vapors: seconds to minutes; Skin: 2 to 18 hours	VX is persistent and a contact hazard; other agents are non-persistent and present mostly inhalation hazards.
Asphyxiant/Blood	Most Arsines; Cyanogen chloride; Hydrogen cyanide	Arsine: Causes intravascular hemolysis that may lead to renal failure.; Cyanogen chloride/hydrogen cyanide: Cyanide directly prevents cells from using oxygen. The cells then use anaerobic respiration, creating excess lactic acid and metabolic acidosis.	Possible cherry-red skin; Possible cyanosis; Confusion; Nausea; Patients may gasp for air; Seizures prior to death; Metabolic acidosis	Immediate onset	Non-persistent and an inhalation hazard.
Vesicant/Blister	Sulfur mustard (HD, H); Nitrogen mustard (HN-1, HN-2, HN-3); Lewisite (L); Phosgene oxime (CX)	Agents are acid-forming compounds that damages skin and respiratory system, resulting burns and respiratory problems.	Severe skin, eye and mucosal pain and irritation; Skin erythema with large fluid blisters that heal slowly and may become infected; Tearing, conjunctivitis, corneal damage; Mild respiratory distress to marked airway damage	Mustards: Vapors: 4 to 6 hours, eyes and lungs affected more rapidly; Skin: 2 to 48 hours; Lewisite: Immediate	Persistent and a contact hazard.
Choking/Pulmonary	Chlorine; Hydrogen chloride; Nitrogen oxides; Phosgene	Similar mechanism to blister agents in that the compounds are acids or acid-forming, but action is more pronounced in respiratory system, flooding it and resulting in suffocation; survivors often suffer chronic breathing problems.	Airway irritation; Eye and skin irritation; Dyspnea, cough; Sore throat; Chest tightness; Wheezing; Bronchospasm	Immediate to 3 hours	Non-persistent and an inhalation hazard.
Lachrymatory agent	Tear gas; Pepper spray	Causes severe stinging of the eyes and temporary blindness.	Powerful eye irritation	Immediate	Non-persistent and an inhalation hazard.
Incapacitating	Agent 15 (BZ)	Causes atropine-like inhibition of acetylcholine in subject. Causes peripheral nervous system effects that are the opposite of those seen in nerve agent poisoning.	May appear as mass drug intoxication with erratic behaviors, shared realistic and distinct hallucinations, disrobing and confusion; Hyperthermia; Ataxia (lack of coordination); Mydriasis (dilated pupils); Dry mouth and skin	Inhaled: 30 minutes to 20 hours; Skin: Up to 36 hours after skin exposure to BZ. Duration is typically 72 to 96 hours.	Extremely persistent in soil and water and on most surfaces; contact hazard.
Cytotoxic proteins	Non-living biological proteins, such as: Ricin; Abrin	Inhibit protein synthesis	Latent period of 4-8 hours, followed by flu-like signs and symptoms; Progress within 18-24 hours to: Inhalation: nausea, cough, dyspnea, pulmonary edema; Ingestion: Gastrointestinal hemorrhage with emesis and bloody diarrhea; eventual liver and kidney failure.	4–24 hours; see symptoms. Exposure by inhalation or injection causes more pronounced signs and symptoms than exposure by ingestion	Slight; agents degrade quickly in environment

There are other chemicals used militarily that are not scheduled by the CWC, and thus are not controlled under the CWC treaties. These include:

- Defoliants and herbicides that destroy vegetation, but are not immediately toxic or poisonous to human beings. Their use is classified as herbicidal warfare. Some batches of Agent Orange, for instance, used by the British during the Malayan Emergency and the United States during the Vietnam War, contained dioxins as manufacturing impurities. Dioxins, rather than Agent Orange itself, have long-term cancer effects and for causing genetic damage leading to serious birth defects.
- Incendiary or explosive chemicals (such as napalm, extensively used by the United States during the Korean War and the Vietnam War, or dynamite) because their destructive effects are primarily due to fire or explosive force, and not direct chemical action. Their use is classified as conventional warfare.
- Viruses, bacteria, or other organisms. Their use is classified as biological warfare. Toxins produced by living organisms are considered chemical weapons, although the boundary is blurry. Toxins are covered by the Biological Weapons Convention.

==== Designations ====
Most chemical weapons are assigned a one- to three-letter "NATO weapon designation" in addition to, or in place of, a common name. Binary munitions, in which precursors for chemical warfare agents are automatically mixed in shell to produce the agent just prior to its use, are indicated by a "-2" following the agent's designation (for example, GB-2 and VX-2).

Some examples are given below:

Blood agents:	Vesicants:
Cyanogen chloride: CK; Hydrogen cyanide: AC	Lewisite: L; Sulfur mustard: H, HD, HS, HT
Pulmonary agents:	Incapacitating agents:
Phosgene: CG	Quinuclidinyl benzilate: BZ
Lachrymatory agents:	Nerve agents:
Pepper spray: OC; Tear gas: CN, CS, CR	Sarin: GB; VE, VG, VM, VX

=== Delivery ===
The most important factor in the effectiveness of chemical weapons is the efficiency of its delivery, or dissemination, to a target. The most common techniques include munitions (such as bombs, projectiles, warheads) that allow dissemination at a distance and spray tanks which disseminate from low-flying aircraft. Developments in the techniques of filling and storage of munitions have also been important.

Although there have been many advances in chemical weapon delivery since World War I, it is still difficult to achieve effective dispersion. The dissemination is highly dependent on atmospheric conditions because many chemical agents act in gaseous form. Thus, weather observations and forecasting are essential to optimize weapon delivery and reduce the risk of injuring friendly forces.

==== Dispersion ====
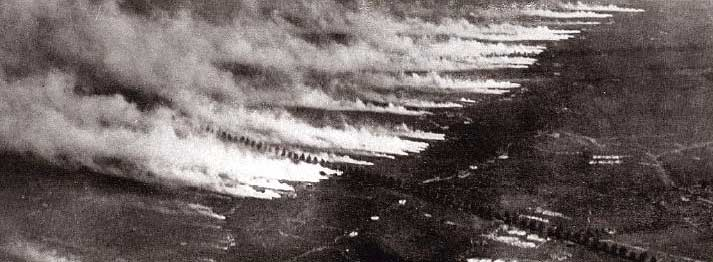
Dispersion of chlorine in World War I

Dispersion is placing the chemical agent upon or adjacent to a target immediately before dissemination, so that the material is most efficiently used. Dispersion is the simplest technique of delivering an agent to its target. The most common techniques are munitions, bombs, projectiles, spray tanks and warheads.

World War I saw the earliest implementation of this technique. The actual first chemical ammunition was the French 26 mm cartouche suffocante rifle grenade, fired from a flare carbine. It contained 35 g (1.2 oz) of the tear-producer ethyl bromoacetate, and was used in autumn 1914 – with little effect on the Germans.

The German military contrarily tried to increase the effect of 10.5 cm (4.1 in) shrapnel shells by adding an irritant – dianisidine chlorosulfonate. Its use against the British at Neuve Chapelle in October 1914 went unnoticed by them. Hans Tappen, a chemist in the Heavy Artillery Department of the War Ministry, suggested to his brother, the Chief of the Operations Branch at German General Headquarters, the use of the tear-gases benzyl bromide or xylyl bromide.

Shells were tested successfully at the Wahn artillery range near Cologne on January 9, 1915, and an order was placed for 15 cm (5.9 in) howitzer shells, designated 'T-shells' after Tappen. A shortage of shells limited the first use against the Russians at the Battle of Bolimów on January 31, 1915; the liquid failed to vaporize in the cold weather, and again the experiment went unnoticed by the Allies.

The first effective use were when the German forces at the Second Battle of Ypres simply opened cylinders of chlorine and allowed the wind to carry the gas across enemy lines. While simple, this technique had numerous disadvantages. Moving large numbers of heavy gas cylinders to the front-line positions from where the gas would be released was a lengthy and difficult logistical task.

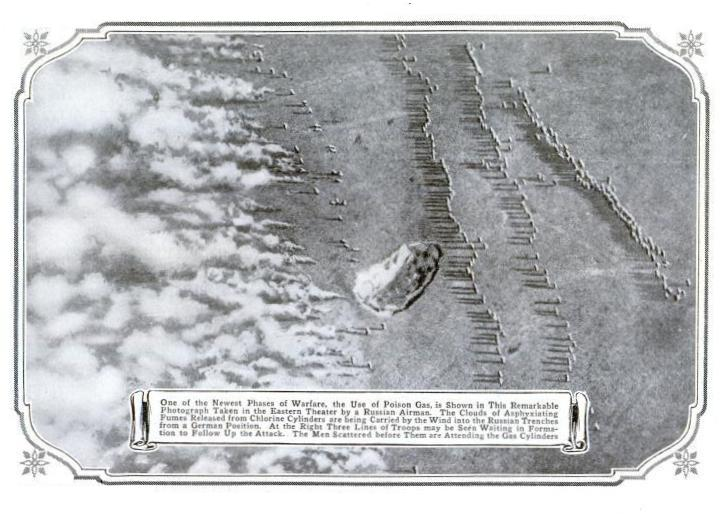
Aerial photograph of a German gas attack on Russian forces c. 1916

Stockpiles of cylinders had to be stored at the front line, posing a great risk if hit by artillery shells. Gas delivery depended greatly on wind speed and direction. If the wind was fickle, as at the Battle of Loos, the gas could blow back, causing friendly casualties.

Gas clouds gave plenty of warning, allowing the enemy time to protect themselves, though many soldiers found the sight of a creeping gas cloud unnerving. This made the gas doubly effective, as, in addition to damaging the enemy physically, it also had a psychological effect on the intended victims.

Another disadvantage was that gas clouds had limited penetration, capable only of affecting the front-line trenches before dissipating. Although it produced limited results in World War I, this technique shows how simple chemical weapon dissemination can be.

Shortly after this "open canister" dissemination, French forces developed a technique for delivery of phosgene in a non-explosive artillery shell. This technique overcame many of the risks of dealing with gas in cylinders. First, gas shells were independent of the wind and increased the effective range of gas, making any target within reach of guns vulnerable. Second, gas shells could be delivered without warning, especially the clear, nearly odorless phosgene—there are numerous accounts of gas shells, landing with a "plop" rather than exploding, being initially dismissed as dud high explosive or shrapnel shells, giving the gas time to work before the soldiers were alerted and took precautions.

The major drawback of artillery delivery was the difficulty of achieving a killing concentration. Each shell had a small gas payload and an area would have to be subjected to saturation bombardment to produce a cloud to match cylinder delivery. A British solution to the problem was the Livens Projector. This was effectively a large-bore mortar, dug into the ground that used the gas cylinders themselves as projectiles – firing a 14 kg (31 lb) cylinder up to 1,500 m (5,000 ft). This combined the gas volume of cylinders with the range of artillery.

Over the years, there were some refinements in this technique. In the 1950s and early 1960s, chemical artillery rockets and cluster bombs contained a multitude of submunitions, so that a large number of small clouds of the chemical agent would form directly on the target.

==== Thermal dissemination ====
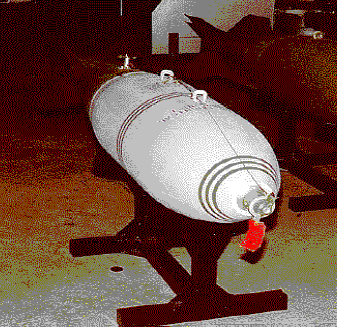
An American-made MC-1 gas bomb

Thermal dissemination is the use of explosives or pyrotechnics to deliver chemical agents. This technique, developed in the 1920s, was a major improvement over earlier dispersal techniques, in that it allowed significant quantities of an agent to be disseminated over a considerable distance. Thermal dissemination remains the principal method of disseminating chemical agents today.

Most thermal dissemination devices consist of a bomb or projectile shell that contains a chemical agent and a central "burster" charge; when the burster detonates, the agent is expelled laterally.

Thermal dissemination devices, though common, are not particularly efficient. First, a percentage of the agent is lost by incineration in the initial blast and by being forced onto the ground. Second, the sizes of the particles vary greatly because explosive dissemination produces a mixture of liquid droplets of variable and difficult to control sizes.

The efficacy of thermal detonation is greatly limited by the flammability of some agents. For flammable aerosols, the cloud is sometimes totally or partially ignited by the disseminating explosion in a phenomenon called flashing. Explosively disseminated VX will ignite roughly one third of the time. Despite a great deal of study, flashing is still not fully understood, and a solution to the problem would be a major technological advance.

Despite the limitations of central bursters, most nations use this method in the early stages of chemical weapon development, in part because standard munitions can be adapted to carry the agents.

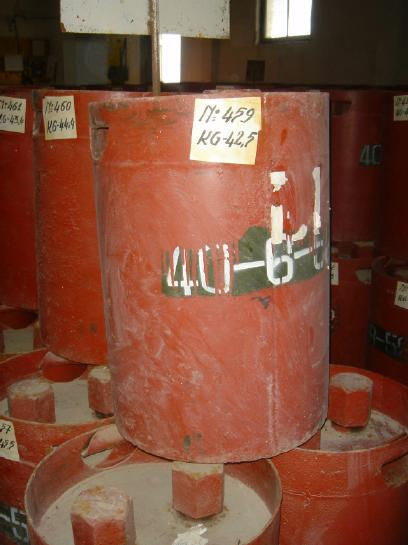
Soviet chemical weapons canisters from a stockpile in Albania

==== Aerodynamic dissemination ====
Aerodynamic dissemination is the non-explosive delivery of a chemical agent from an aircraft, allowing aerodynamic stress to disseminate the agent. This technique is the most recent major development in chemical agent dissemination, originating in the mid-1960s.

This technique eliminates many of the limitations of thermal dissemination by eliminating the flashing effect and theoretically allowing precise control of particle size. In actuality, the altitude of dissemination, wind direction and velocity, and the direction and velocity of the aircraft greatly influence particle size. There are other drawbacks as well; ideal deployment requires precise knowledge of aerodynamics and fluid dynamics, and because the agent must usually be dispersed within the boundary layer (less than 60–90 m or 200–300 ft above the ground), it puts pilots at risk.

Significant research is still being applied toward this technique. For example, by modifying the properties of the liquid, its breakup when subjected to aerodynamic stress can be controlled and an idealized particle distribution achieved, even at supersonic speed. Additionally, advances in fluid dynamics, computer modeling, and weather forecasting allow an ideal direction, speed, and altitude to be calculated, such that warfare agent of a predetermined particle size can predictably and reliably hit a target.

=== Protection against chemical warfare ===
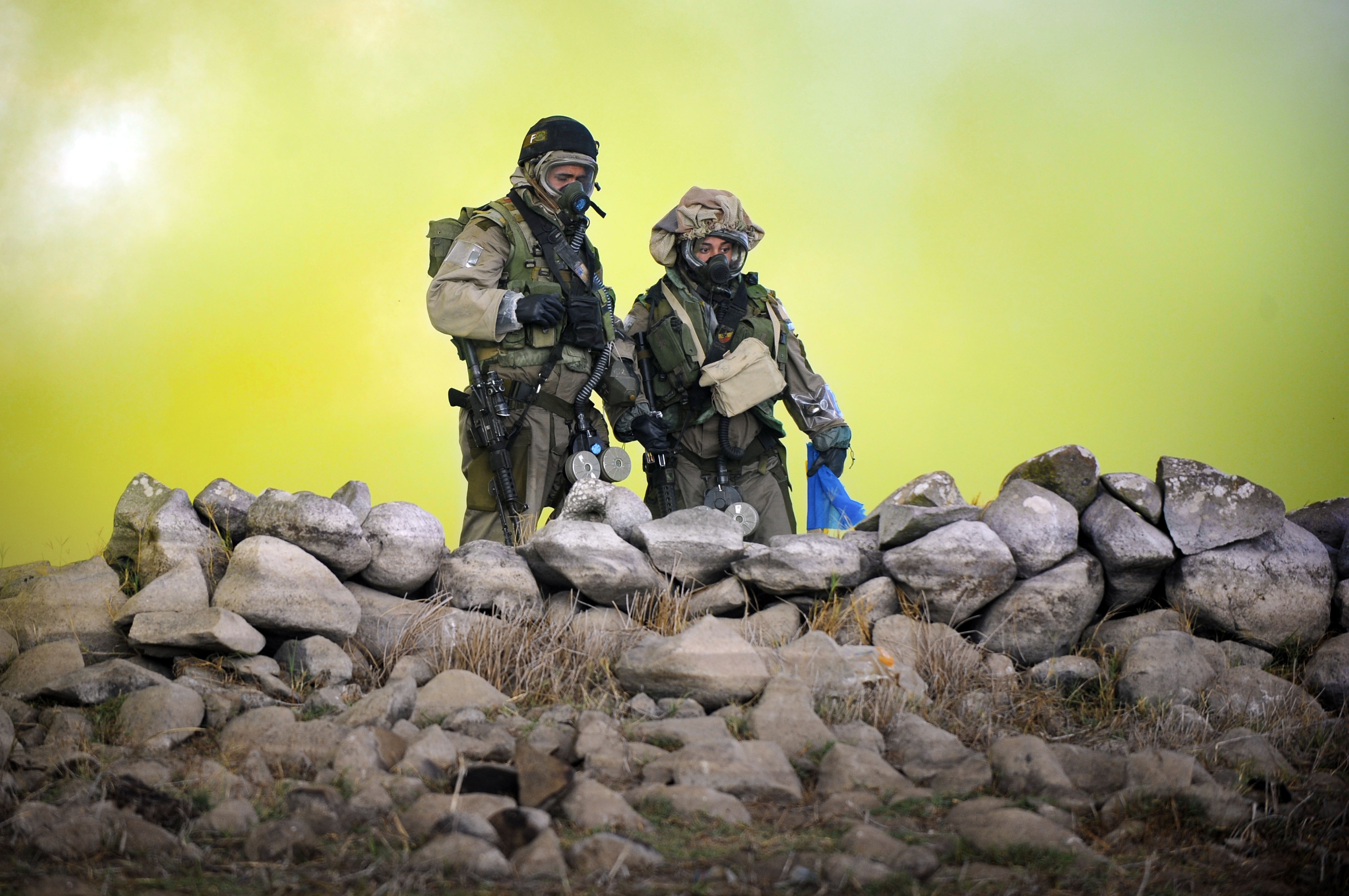
Israel Defense Forces "Yanshuf" battalion soldiers at chemical warfare defense exercise

Ideal protection begins with nonproliferation treaties such as the CWC, and detecting, very early, the signatures of someone building a chemical weapons capability. These include a wide range of intelligence disciplines, such as economic analysis of exports of dual-use chemicals and equipment, human intelligence (HUMINT) such as diplomatic, refugee, and agent reports; photography from satellites, aircraft and drones (IMINT); examination of captured equipment (TECHINT); communications intercepts (COMINT); and detection of chemical manufacturing and chemical agents themselves (MASINT).

If all the preventive measures fail and there is a clear and present danger, then there is a need for detection of chemical attacks, collective protection, and decontamination. Since industrial accidents can cause dangerous chemical releases (e.g., the Bhopal disaster), these activities are things that civilian, as well as military, organizations must be prepared to carry out. In civilian situations in developed countries, these are duties of HAZMAT organizations, which most commonly are part of fire departments.

Detection has been referred to above, as a technical MASINT discipline; specific military procedures, which are usually the model for civilian procedures, depend on the equipment, expertise, and personnel available. When chemical agents are detected, an alarm needs to sound, with specific warnings over emergency broadcasts and the like. There may be a warning to expect an attack.

If, for example, the captain of a US Navy ship believes there is a serious threat of chemical, biological, or radiological attack, the crew may be ordered to set Circle William, which means closing all openings to outside air, running breathing air through filters, and possibly starting a system that continually washes down the exterior surfaces. Civilian authorities dealing with an attack or a toxic chemical accident will invoke the Incident Command System, or local equivalent, to coordinate defensive measures.

Individual protection starts with a gas mask and, depending on the nature of the threat, through various levels of protective clothing up to a complete chemical-resistant suit with a self-contained air supply. The US military defines various levels of MOPP (mission-oriented protective posture) from mask to full chemical resistant suits; Hazmat suits are the civilian equivalent, but go farther to include a fully independent air supply, rather than the filters of a gas mask.

Collective protection allows continued functioning of groups of people in buildings or shelters, the latter which may be fixed, mobile, or improvised. With ordinary buildings, this may be as basic as plastic sheeting and tape, although if the protection needs to be continued for any appreciable length of time, there will need to be an air supply, typically an enhanced gas mask.

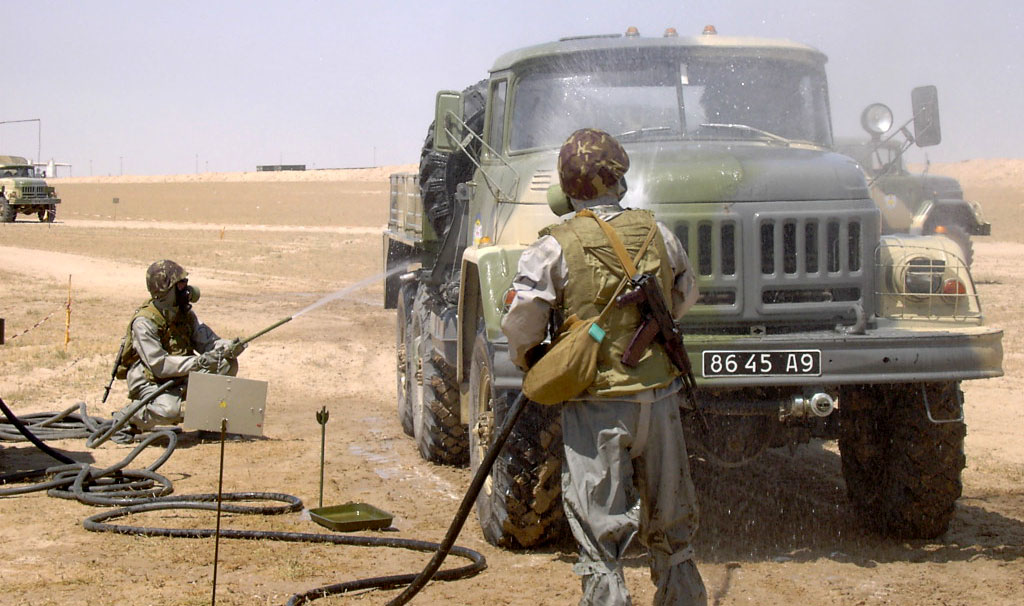
Members of the Ukrainian Army's 19th Nuclear, Biological and Chemical Battalion practice decontamination drill, at Camp Arifjan, Kuwait

==== Decontamination ====
Decontamination varies with the particular chemical agent used. Some nonpersistent agents, including most pulmonary agents (chlorine, phosgene, and so on), blood gases, and nonpersistent nerve gases (e.g., GB), will dissipate from open areas, although powerful exhaust fans may be needed to clear out buildings where they have accumulated.

In some cases, it might be necessary to neutralize them chemically, as with ammonia as a neutralizer for hydrogen cyanide or chlorine. Riot control agents such as CS will dissipate in an open area, but things contaminated with CS powder need to be aired out, washed by people wearing protective gear, or safely discarded.

Mass decontamination is a less common requirement for people than equipment, since people may be immediately affected and treatment is the action required. It is a requirement when people have been contaminated with persistent agents. Treatment and decontamination may need to be simultaneous, with the medical personnel protecting themselves so they can function.

There may need to be immediate intervention to prevent death, such as injection of atropine for nerve agents. Decontamination is especially important for people contaminated with persistent agents; many of the fatalities after the explosion of a WWII US ammunition ship carrying sulfur mustard, in the harbor of Bari, Italy, after a German bombing on December 2, 1943, came when rescue workers, not knowing of the contamination, bundled cold, wet seamen in tight-fitting blankets.

For decontaminating equipment and buildings exposed to persistent agents, such as blister agents, VX or other agents made persistent by mixing with a thickener, special equipment and materials might be needed. Some type of neutralizing agent will be needed; e.g. in the form of a spraying device with neutralizing agents such as Chlorine, Fichlor, strong alkaline solutions or enzymes. In other cases, a specific chemical decontaminant will be required.

== Sociopolitical climate ==
There are many instances of the use of chemical weapons in battles documented in Greek and Roman historical texts; the earliest example was the deliberate poisoning of Kirrha's water supply with hellebore in the First Sacred War, Greece, about 590 BC.

One of the earliest reactions to the use of chemical agents was from Rome. Struggling to defend themselves from the Roman legions, Germanic tribes poisoned the wells of their enemies, with Roman jurists having been recorded as declaring "armis bella non venenis geri", meaning "war is fought with weapons, not with poisons." Yet the Romans themselves resorted to poisoning wells of besieged cities in Anatolia in the 2nd century BC.

Before 1915 the use of poisonous chemicals in battle was typically the result of local initiative, and not the result of an active government chemical weapons program. There are many reports of the isolated use of chemical agents in individual battles or sieges, but there was no true tradition of their use outside of incendiaries and smoke. Despite this tendency, there have been several attempts to initiate large-scale implementation of poison gas in several wars, but with the notable exception of World War I, the responsible authorities generally rejected the proposals for ethical reasons or fears of retaliation.

For example, in 1854 Lyon Playfair (later 1st Baron Playfair), GCB, PC, FRS (1818–1898), a British chemist, proposed using a cacodyl cyanide-filled artillery shell against enemy ships during the Crimean War. The British Ordnance Department rejected the proposal as "as bad a mode of warfare as poisoning the wells of the enemy."

=== Efforts to eradicate chemical weapons ===
Countries with known or possible chemical weapons, as of 2021
Nation	CW Possession	Signed CWC	Ratified CWC
Albania	Eliminated, 2007	January 14, 1993	May 11, 1994
China	Probable	January 13, 1993	April 4, 1997
Egypt	Probable	No	No
India	Eliminated, 2009	January 14, 1993	September 3, 1996
Iran	Possible	January 13, 1993	November 3, 1997
Iraq	Eliminated, 2018	January 13, 2009	February 12, 2009
Israel	Probable	January 13, 1993	No
Japan	Probable	January 13, 1993	September 15, 1995
Libya	Eliminated, 2014	No	January 6, 2004 (acceded)
Myanmar (Burma)	Possible	January 14, 1993	July 8, 2015
North Korea	Known	No	No
Pakistan	Probable	January 13, 1993	November 27, 1997
Russia	Eliminated, 2017	January 13, 1993	November 5, 1997
Serbia and Montenegro	Probable	No	April 20, 2000 (acceded)
Sudan	Possible	No	May 24, 1999 (acceded)
Syria	Known	No	September 14, 2013 (acceded)
Taiwan	Possible	n/a	n/a
United States	Eliminated, 2023	January 13, 1993	April 25, 1997
Vietnam	Possible	January 13, 1993	September 30, 1998

- August 27, 1874: The Brussels Declaration Concerning the Laws and Customs of War is signed, specifically forbidding the "employment of poison or poisoned weapons", although the treaty was not adopted by any nation whatsoever and it never went into effect.
- September 4, 1900: The First Hague Convention, which includes a declaration banning the "use of projectiles the object of which is the diffusion of asphyxiating or deleterious gases," enters into force.
- January 26, 1910: The Second Hague Convention enters into force, prohibiting the use of "poison or poisoned weapons" in warfare.
- February 6, 1922: After World War I, the Washington Arms Conference Treaty prohibited the use of asphyxiating, poisonous or other gases. It was signed by the United States, Britain, Japan, France, and Italy, but France objected to other provisions in the treaty and it never went into effect.
- February 8, 1928: The Geneva Protocol enters into force, prohibiting the use of "asphyxiating, poisonous or other gases, and of all analogous liquids, materials or devices" and "bacteriological methods of warfare".

=== Chemical weapon proliferation ===
Despite numerous efforts to reduce or eliminate them, some nations continue to research and/or stockpile chemical warfare agents.

In 1997, future US Vice President Dick Cheney opposed the signing ratification of a treaty banning the use of chemical weapons. In a letter dated April 8, 1997, then Halliburton-CEO Cheney told Sen. Jesse Helms, the chairman of the Senate Foreign Relations Committee, that it would be a mistake for America to join the convention. "Those nations most likely to comply with the Chemical Weapons Convention are not likely to ever constitute a military threat to the United States. The governments we should be concerned about are likely to cheat on the CWC, even if they do participate," reads the letter, published by the Federation of American Scientists.

The CWC was ratified by the Senate that same month. In the following years, Albania, Libya, Russia, the United States, and India declared over 71,000 metric tons of chemical weapon stockpiles, and destroyed a third of them. Under the terms of the agreement, the United States and Russia agreed to eliminate the rest of their supplies of chemical weapons by 2012, but ended up taking far longer to do so as shown in the previous and following section of this article.

== Chemical weapons destruction ==
=== India ===
In June 1997, India declared that it had a stockpile of 1044 tons of sulphur mustard in its possession. India's declaration of its stockpile came after its entry into the Chemical Weapons Convention, that created the Organisation for the Prohibition of Chemical Weapons, and on January 14, 1993, India became one of the original signatories to the Chemical Weapons Convention. By 2005, from among six nations that had declared their possession of chemical weapons, India was the only country to meet its deadline for chemical weapons destruction and for inspection of its facilities by the Organisation for the Prohibition of Chemical Weapons. By 2006, India had destroyed more than 75 percent of its chemical weapons and material stockpile and was granted an extension to complete a 100 percent destruction of its stocks by April 2009. On May 14, 2009, India informed the United Nations that it has completely destroyed its stockpile of chemical weapons.

=== Iraq ===
The Director-General of the Organisation for the Prohibition of Chemical Weapons, Ambassador Rogelio Pfirter, welcomed Iraq's decision to join the OPCW as a significant step to strengthening global and regional efforts to prevent the spread and use of chemical weapons. The OPCW announced "The government of Iraq has deposited its instrument of accession to the Chemical Weapons Convention with the Secretary General of the United Nations and within 30 days, on 12 February 2009, will become the 186th State Party to the Convention". Iraq has also declared stockpiles of chemical weapons, and because of their 2011 accession is the only State Party exempted from the destruction time-line.

=== Japan ===
During the Second Sino-Japanese War (1937–1945) Japan stored chemical weapons on the territory of mainland China. The weapon stock mostly containing sulfur mustard-lewisite mixture. The weapons are classified as abandoned chemical weapons under the Chemical Weapons Convention, and from September 2010 Japan has started their destruction in Nanjing using mobile destruction facilities in order to do so.

=== Russia ===
Russia signed into the Chemical Weapons Convention on January 13, 1993, and ratified it on November 5, 1995. Declaring an arsenal of 39,967 tons of chemical weapons in 1997, by far the largest arsenal, consisting of blister agents: Lewisite, Sulfur mustard, Lewisite-mustard mix, and nerve agents: Sarin, Soman, and VX. Russia met its treaty obligations by destroying 1 percent of its chemical agents by the 2002 deadline set out by the Chemical Weapons Convention, but requested an extension on the deadlines of 2004 and 2007 due to technical, financial, and environmental challenges of chemical disposal. Since, Russia has received help from other countries such as Canada which donated C$100,000, plus a further C$100,000 already donated, to the Russian Chemical Weapons Destruction Program. This money will be used to complete work at Shchuch'ye and support the construction of a chemical weapons destruction facility at Kizner (Russia), where the destruction of nearly 5,700 tons of nerve agent, stored in approximately 2 million artillery shells and munitions, will be undertaken. Canadian funds are also being used for the operation of a Green Cross Public Outreach Office, to keep the civilian population informed on the progress made in chemical weapons destruction activities.

As of July 2011, Russia has destroyed 48 percent (18,241 tons) of its stockpile at destruction facilities located in Gorny (Saratov Oblast) and Kambarka (Udmurt Republic) – where operations have finished – and Schuch'ye (Kurgan Oblast), Maradykovsky (Kirov Oblast), Leonidovka (Penza Oblast) whilst installations are under construction in Pochep (Bryansk Oblast) and Kizner (Udmurt Republic). As August 2013, 76 percent (30,500 tons) were destroyed, and Russia leaves the Cooperative Threat Reduction (CTR) Program, which partially funded chemical weapons destruction.

In September 2017, OPCW announced that Russia had destroyed its entire chemical weapons stockpile.

=== United States ===
On November 25, 1969, President Richard Nixon unilaterally renounced the offensive use of biological and toxic weapons, but the U.S. continued to maintain an offensive chemical weapons program.

From May 1964 to the early 1970s the U.S. participated in Operation CHASE, a United States Department of Defense program that aimed to dispose of chemical weapons by sinking ships laden with the weapons in the deep Atlantic. After the Marine Protection, Research, and Sanctuaries Act of 1972, Operation Chase was scrapped and safer disposal methods for chemical weapons were researched, with the U.S. destroying several thousand tons of sulfur mustard by incineration at the Rocky Mountain Arsenal, and nearly 4,200 tons of nerve agent by chemical neutralisation at Tooele Army Depot.

The U.S. began stockpile reductions in the 1980s with the removal of outdated munitions and destroying its entire stock of 3-Quinuclidinyl benzilate (BZ or Agent 15) at the beginning of 1988. In June 1990 the Johnston Atoll Chemical Agent Disposal System began destruction of chemical agents stored on the Johnston Atoll in the Pacific, seven years before the Chemical Weapons Treaty came into effect. In 1986 President Ronald Reagan made an agreement with German Chancellor Helmut Kohl to remove the U.S. stockpile of chemical weapons from Germany. In 1990, as part of Operation Steel Box, two ships were loaded with over 100,000 shells containing Sarin and VX were taken from the U.S. Army weapons storage depots such as Miesau and then-classified FSTS (Forward Storage / Transportation Sites) and transported from Bremerhaven, Germany to Johnston Atoll in the Pacific, a 46-day nonstop journey.

In the 1980s, Congress, at the urging of the Reagan administration, provided funding for the manufacture of binary chemical weapons (sarin artillery shells) from 1987 until 1990, but this was halted after the U.S. and the Soviet Union entered into a bilateral agreement in June 1990. In the 1990 agreement, the U.S. and Soviet Union agreed to begin destroying their chemical weapons stockpiles before 1993 and to reduce them to no more than 5,000 agent tons each by the end of 2002. The agreement also provided for exchanges of data and inspections of sites to verify destruction. Following the collapse of the Soviet Union, the U.S.'s Nunn–Lugar Cooperative Threat Reduction program helped eliminate some of the chemical, biological and nuclear stockpiles of the former Soviet Union.

The United Nations Conference on Disarmament in Geneva in 1980 led to the development of the Chemical Weapons Convention (CWC), a multilateral treaty that prohibited the development, production, stockpiling, and use of chemical weapons, and required the elimination of existing stockpiles. The treaty expressly prohibited state parties from making reservations (unilateral caveats). During the Reagan administration and the George H. W. Bush administration, the U.S. participated in the negotiations toward the CWC. The CWC was concluded on September 3, 1992, and opened for signature on January 13, 1993. The U.S. became one of 87 original state parties to the CWC. President Bill Clinton submitted it to the U.S. Senate for ratification on November 23, 1993. Ratification was blocked in the Senate for years, largely as a result of opposition from Senator Jesse Helms, the chairman of the Senate Foreign Relations Committee. On April 24, 1997, the Senate gave its consent to ratification of the CWC by a 74–26 vote (satisfying the required two-thirds majority). The U.S. deposited its instrument of ratification at the United Nations on April 25, 1997, a few days before the CWC entered into force. The U.S. ratification allowed the U.S. to participate in the Organisation for the Prohibition of Chemical Weapons, the organization based in The Hague that oversees implementation of the CWC.

Upon U.S. ratification of the CWC, the U.S. declared a total of 29,918 tons of chemical weapons, and committed to destroying all of the U.S.'s chemical weapons and bulk agent. The U.S. was one of eight states to declare a stockpile of chemical weapons and to commit to their safe elimination. The U.S. committed in the CWC to destroy its entire chemical arsenal within 10 years of the entry into force (i.e., by April 29, 2007), However, at a 2012 conference, the parties to the CWC parties agreed to extend the U.S. deadline to 2023. By 2012, stockpiles had been eliminated at seven of the U.S.'s nine chemical weapons depots and 89.75% of the 1997 stockpile was destroyed. The depots were the Aberdeen Chemical Agent Disposal Facility, Anniston Chemical Disposal Facility, Johnston Atoll, Newport Chemical Agent Disposal Facility, Pine Bluff Chemical Disposal Facility, Tooele Chemical Disposal Facility, Umatilla Chemical Disposal Facility, and Deseret Chemical Depot. The U.S. closed each site after the completion of stockpile destruction. In 2019, the U.S. began to eliminate its chemical-weapon stockpile at the last of the nine U.S. chemical weapons storage facilities: the Blue Grass Army Depot in Kentucky. By May 2021, the U.S. destroyed all of its Category 2 and Category 3 chemical weapons and 96.52% of its Category 1 chemical weapons. The U.S. is scheduled to complete the elimination of all its chemical weapons by the September 2023 deadline. In July 2023 OPCW confirmed the last chemical munition of the U.S., and that the last chemical weapon from the stockpiles declared by all States Parties to the Chemical Weapons Convention was verified as destroyed.

The U.S. has maintained a "calculated ambiguity" policy that warns potential adversaries that a chemical or biological attack against the U.S. or its allies will prompt an "overwhelming and devastating" response. The policy deliberately leaves open the question of whether the U.S. would respond to a chemical attempt with nuclear retaliation. Commentators have noted that this policy gives policymakers more flexibility, at the possible cost of decreased strategic unpreparedness.

== Anti-agriculture ==
=== Herbicidal warfare ===
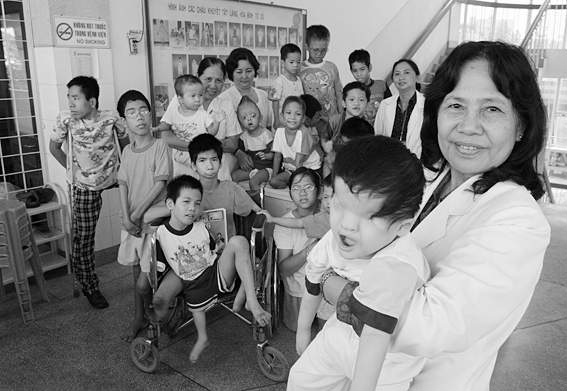
Disabled children in Vietnam, most of them impacted by Agent Orange, 2004

Although herbicidal warfare use chemical substances, its main purpose is to disrupt agricultural food production and/or to destroy plants which provide cover or concealment to the enemy.

The use of herbicides by the U.S. military during the Vietnam War has left tangible, long-term impacts upon the Vietnamese people and U.S. veterans of the war. The government of Vietnam says that around 24% of the forests of Southern Vietnam were defoliated and up to four million people in Vietnam were exposed to Agent Orange. They state that as many as three million people have developed illness because of Agent Orange while the Red Cross of Vietnam estimates that up to one million people were disabled or have health problems associated with Agent Orange. The United States government has described these figures as unreliable. During the war, the U.S. fought the North Vietnamese and their allies in Laos and Cambodia, dropping large quantities of Agent Orange in each of those countries. According on one estimate, the U.S. dropped 475,500 US gallons (1,800,000 L) of Agent Orange in Laos and 40,900 US gallons (155,000 L) in Cambodia. Because Laos and Cambodia were officially neutral during the Vietnam War, the U.S. attempted to keep secret its military involvement in these countries. The U.S. has stated that Agent Orange was not widely used and therefore hasn't offered assistance to affected Cambodians or Laotians, and limits benefits American veterans and CIA personnel who were stationed there.

=== Anti-livestock ===
During the Mau Mau Uprising in 1952, the poisonous latex of the African milk bush was used to kill cattle.

== See also ==
- 1990 Chemical Weapons Accord
- Ali Hassan al-Majid
- Area denial weapon
- Chemical weapon designation
- Chemical weapons and the United Kingdom
- Gas chamber
- List of CBRN warfare forces
- List of chemical warfare agents
- List of highly toxic gases
- List of psychoactive drugs used by militaries
- Ronald Maddison
- Psychochemical weapon
- Saint Julien Memorial
- Sardasht, West Azerbaijan, a town attacked with chemical weapons during the Iran–Iraq War
- Stink bomb
- United States Army Medical Research Institute of Chemical Defense
