= Schedule 2 =

Schedule 2 may refer to:

- Second Schedule of the Constitution of India, about the rights of government officials
- Schedule 2 - CD within the UK Misuse of Drugs Act 1971
- Schedule II Controlled Substances within the US Controlled Substances Act
  - List of Schedule II drugs (US)
- Schedule II Controlled Drugs and Substances within the Canadian Controlled Drugs and Substances Act
- Schedule II Psychotropic Substances within the Thai Psychotropic Substances Act
- Schedule II Narcotic Drugs and Psychotropic Substances within the Estonian Narcotic Drugs and Psychotropic Substances Act
- Schedule II Psychotropic Substances within the U.N. Convention on Psychotropic Substances
- Schedule II within the UN Single Convention on Narcotic Drugs
- Schedule II Banks within the Canada Bank Act
- Schedule 2 Substances within the Chemical Weapons Convention

== See also ==
- Schedule 1 (disambiguation)
- Schedule 3 (disambiguation)
- Schedule 4 (disambiguation)
- Schedule 5 (disambiguation)
