= Schedule 1 =

Schedule 1 may refer to:

- List of Schedule 1 substances (CWC)
- First Schedule of the Constitution of India, defining the states and union territories of India
- Schedule 1 - CD Lic within the UK Misuse of Drugs Act 1971
- Schedule I Controlled Substances within the US Controlled Substances Act
- Schedule I Controlled Drugs and Substances within the Canadian Controlled Drugs and Substances Act
- Schedule I Psychotropic Substances within the Thai Psychotropic Substances Act
- Schedule I Narcotic Drugs and Psychotropic Substances within the Estonian Narcotic Drugs and Psychotropic Substances Act
- Schedule I of the Indian Narcotic Drugs and Psychotropic Substances Act, listing psychotropic substances
- Schedule I Psychotropic Substances within the U.N. Convention on Psychotropic Substances
- Schedule I within the UN Single Convention on Narcotic Drugs
- Schedule I Banks within the Canada Bank Act
- Schedule 1 to the National Health Service (General Medical Services Contracts) (Prescription of Drugs etc.) Regulations 2004, the NHS treatments blacklist
- Schedule I, a 2025 video game centering on drug trafficking

== See also ==
- Schedule 2 (disambiguation)
- Schedule 3 (disambiguation)
- Schedule 4 (disambiguation)
- Schedule 5 (disambiguation)
