= Schedule 3 =

Schedule 3/Schedule III may refer to:

- Third Schedule of the Constitution of India, relating to oaths and affirmations
- Schedule 3 - CD No Reg within the UK Misuse of Drugs Act 1971
- Schedule III Controlled Substances within the US Controlled Substances Act
- Schedule III Controlled Drugs and Substances within the Canadian Controlled Drugs and Substances Act
- Schedule III Psychotropic Substances within the Thai Psychotropic Substances Act
- Schedule III Psychotropic Substances within the U.N. Convention on Psychotropic Substances
- Schedule III within the UN Single Convention on Narcotic Drugs
- Schedule III Banks within the Canada Bank Act
- Schedule 3 compounds within the Chemical Weapons Convention

== See also ==
- Schedule 1 (disambiguation)
- Schedule 2 (disambiguation)
- Schedule 4 (disambiguation)
- Schedule 5 (disambiguation)
