= Schedule 4 =

Schedule 4 or Schedule IV may refer to:

- Fourth Schedule to the Constitution of India, providing for the number of Rajya Sabha (upper house of the Indian parliament) seats to each state
- Schedule 4 within the UK Misuse of Drugs Act 1971
- Schedule IV Controlled Substances within the US Controlled Substances Act (List)
- Schedule IV Controlled Drugs and Substances within the Canadian Controlled Drugs and Substances Act
- Schedule IV Psychotropic Substances within the Thai Psychotropic Substances Act
- Schedule IV Narcotic Drugs and Psychotropic Substances within the Estonian Narcotic Drugs and Psychotropic Substances Act
- Schedule IV Psychotropic Substances within the U.N. Convention on Psychotropic Substances
- Schedule IV within the UN Single Convention on Narcotic Drugs
- Schedule 4 of the Crown Minerals Act 1991 in New Zealand
- Schedule 4 Prescription Only Medicines within the Australia Poisons Standard

== See also ==
- Schedule 1 (disambiguation)
- Schedule 2 (disambiguation)
- Schedule 3 (disambiguation)
- Schedule 5 (disambiguation)
