= C3H9O3P =

The molecular formula C_{3}H_{9}O_{3}P (molar mass: 124.076 g/mol, exact mass: 124.0289 u) may refer to:

- Dimethyl methylphosphonate
- Trimethyl phosphite
