= NDPS =

The initialism NDPS may stand for:

- Narcotic Drugs and Psychotropic Substances Act (disambiguation) - law in various jurisdictions
- Novell Distributed Print Services, a component of Novell NetWare
- NEW DIGAMBER PUBLIC SCHOOL-a school
- Notre Dame Public School-a school
