= Schedules of substances annexed to the Chemical Weapons Convention =

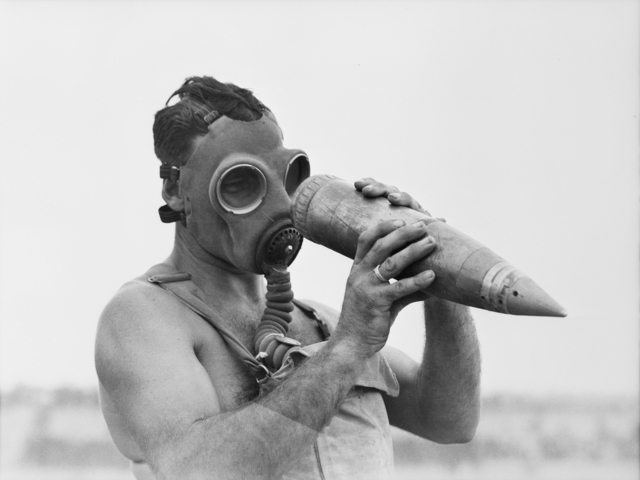
Gas shell

The schedules of substances annexed to the Chemical Weapons Convention (CWC) list toxic substances and their precursors which can be used for the production of chemical weapons, the use of which is permitted by State Parties to the Chemical Weapons Convention only to a limited extent under the supervision of the Organisation for the Prohibition of Chemical Weapons (OPCW). State Parties are required to provide the OPCW with an annual summary of the production and use in their territory of substances listed in these Schedules, in accordance with the Convention.

== Background ==
The Chemical Weapons Convention (CWC) provides for a worldwide prohibition of the development, production, proliferation and use of chemical weapons, prohibition of their stockpiling, and destruction of existing chemical weapons that a Member State has in its possession or has abandoned elsewhere. The Annex on Chemicals to the CWC lists toxic substances that can be used to make chemical weapons and are under supervision by the OPCW.

== The lists ==
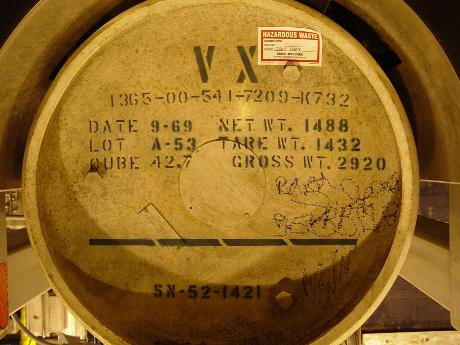
Container with VX

The Annex on Chemicals contains three lists of substances whose use is prohibited or restricted under the Convention. Part A of the Annex contains guidelines for inclusion in the lists; Part B contains the lists themselves. The lists are compiled according to decreasing probability that the substance is intended for military use. The Lists themselves are divided into part A with toxic substances that can be used directly as chemical weapons and part B containing their precursors (chemicals with which those substances can be made). The Lists are subject to the following criteria, among others:

- Schedule 1 contains substances most clearly related to a chemical weapon. They have been specially developed for or have already been used as chemical weapons and there is a high risk that these substances or their precursors will be used for that purpose. These chemicals have little or no use for peaceful purposes in commercial or industrial activities. Examples are VX, sarin, mustard gas and the biological toxins ricin and saxitoxin.

Schedule 1 substances shall not be produced, acquired, retained or used at all by State Parties outside their territories, except in limited quantities for research, medical or protection purposes.

- Schedule 2 contains substances that pose a significant risk for use as a chemical weapon, or as a precursor of a substance from List 1 or List 2, part A. These substances also have a limited use in not large quantities for other purposes than a chemical weapon. In large quantities, there is a good chance that they are intended for use as a chemical weapon. Examples are amiton and BZ.
- Schedule 3 contains substances that pose a risk for use as a chemical weapon or as a precursor thereof. However, these substances are also used in large quantities for purposes other than for a chemical weapon (dual-use). Examples are phosgene and hydrogen cyanide.

== Annual declarations ==
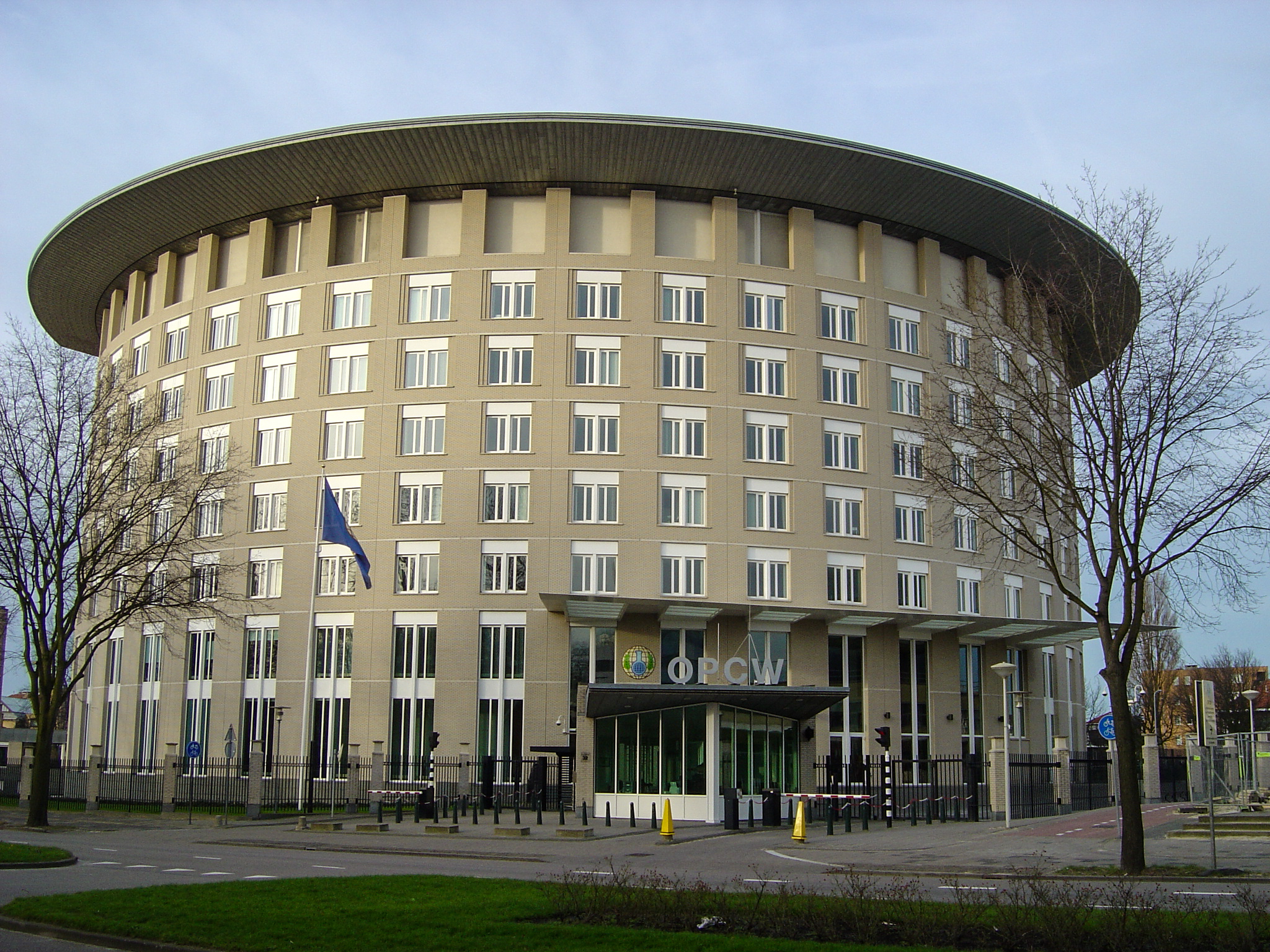
Headquarters of the OPCW in The Hague

The State Parties to the Convention are required to provide the monitoring Organisation for the Prohibition of Chemical Weapons (OPCW) annually with an overview of the production of substances covered by the Convention. Any (intended) production of Schedule 1 chemicals or transfers thereof to other Contracting States must be declared. Schedules 2 and 3 chemicals produced on their territory must also be reported in the annual statement insofar as the quantity thereof has exceeded a certain threshold value. With a few exceptions, only annually produced quantities above 100 kg of List 2 substances from Part A or 1000 kg of a precursor from Part B must be reported to the OPCW by the Contracting States. A limit of 1 kg applies to the substance BZ in List 2. For substances in List 3, a threshold value of 30 tonnes applies.
