= Psychotropic Substances Act =

"Psychotropic Substances Act" may refer to several national laws designed to fulfill treaty obligations under the Convention on Psychotropic Substances:

- Psychotropic Substances Act (United States)
- Psychotropic Substances Act (Thailand)

== See also ==
- Narcotic Drugs and Psychotropic Substances Act (disambiguation)
- Psychotropic substances
