= Narcotic Drugs and Psychotropic Substances Act =

"Narcotic Drugs and Psychotropic Substances Act" is the title of several national laws designed to implement the Single Convention on Narcotic Drugs and Convention on Psychotropic Substances, including:

- Narcotic Drugs and Psychotropic Substances Act (Estonia)
- Narcotic Drugs and Psychotropic Substances Act (India)
- Narcotic Drugs and Psychotropic Substances Act (Sudan)

== See also ==
- Psychotropic Substances Act (disambiguation)
