= Methylphosphonyl dichloride =

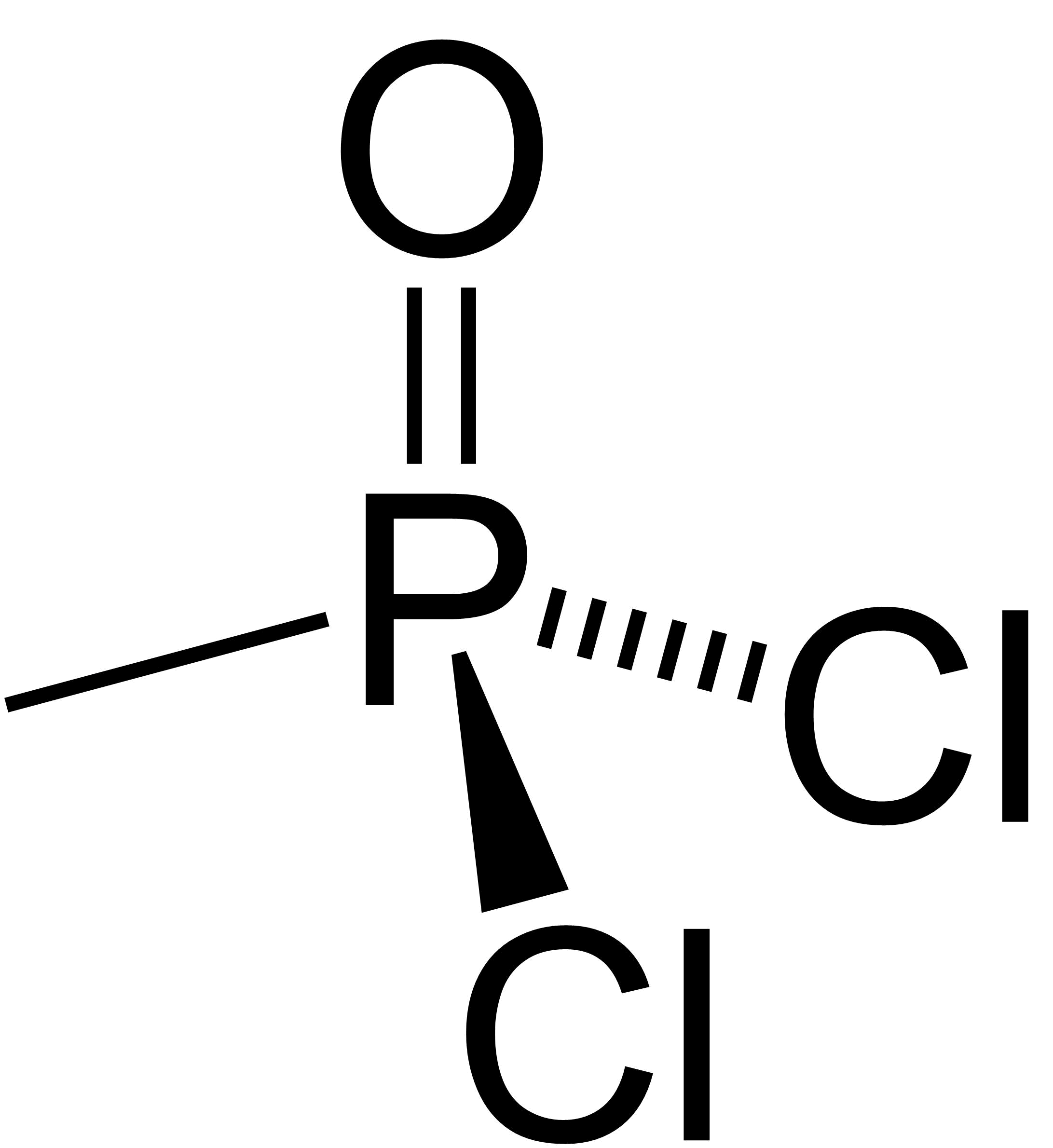

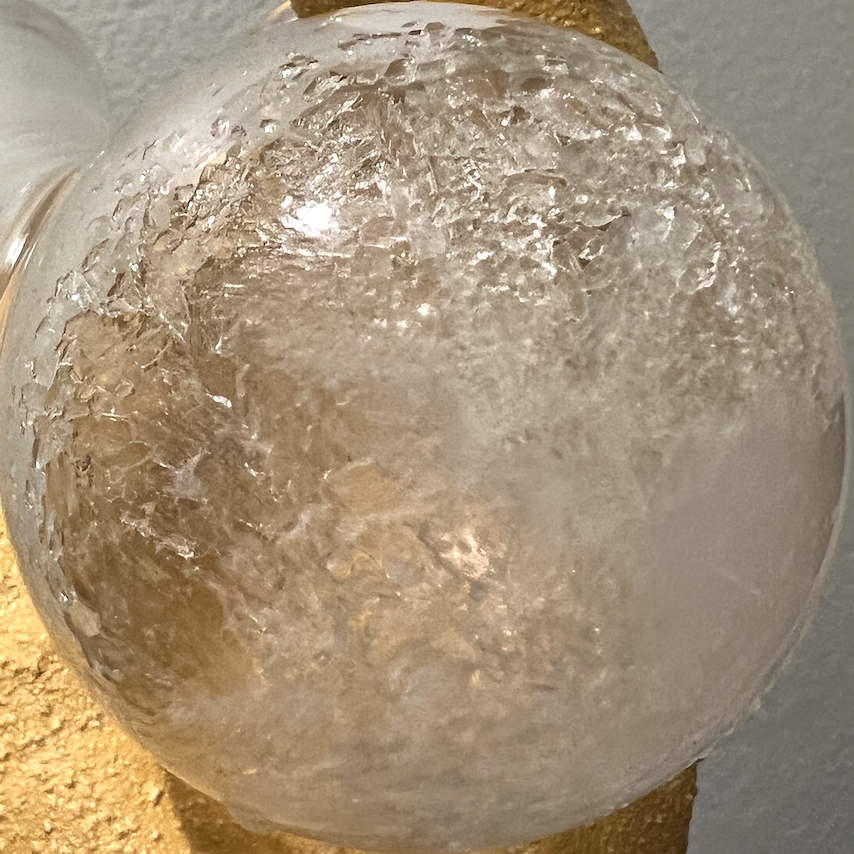

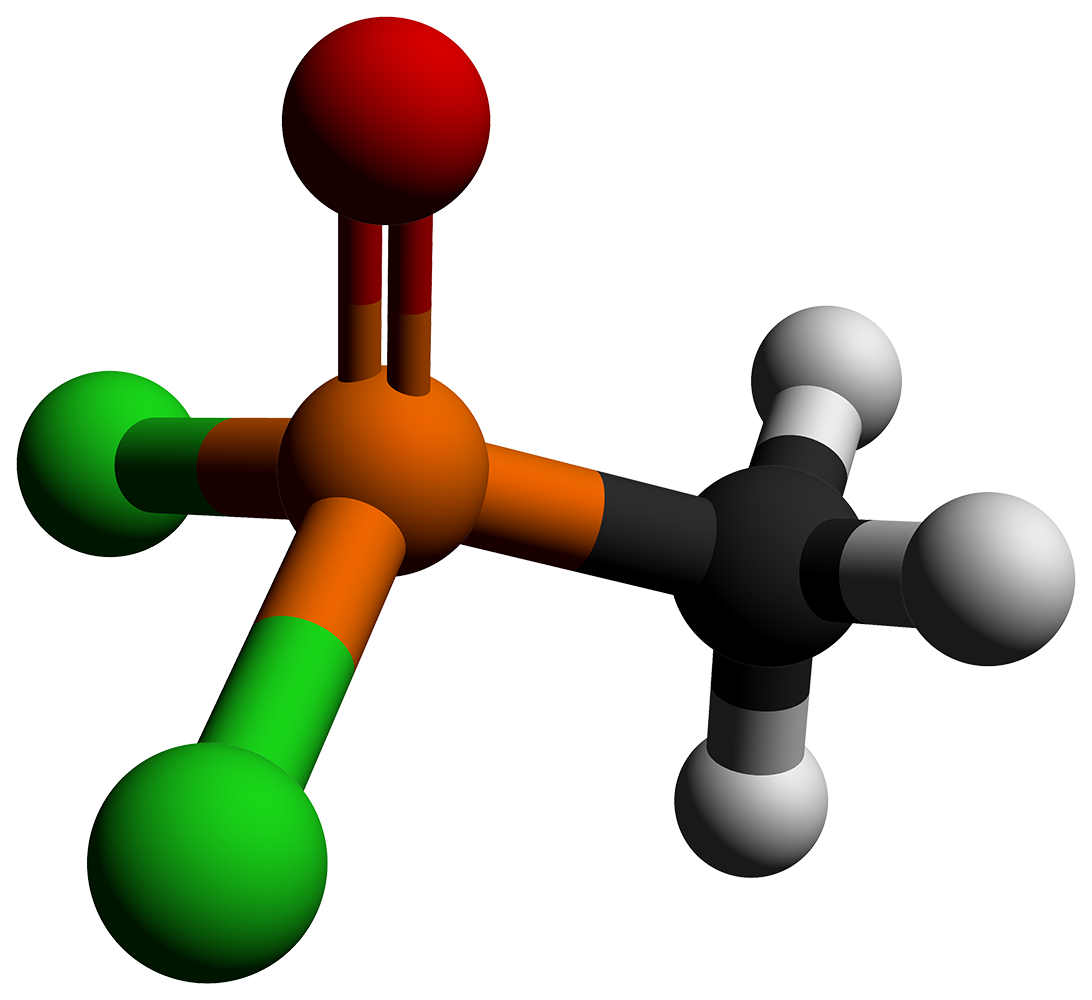

Names
- Preferred IUPAC name Methylphosphonic dichloride
- Other names Methanephosphonic dichloride Methanephosphonic acid dichloride Methylphosphonyl dichloride Dichloro

Identifiers
CAS Number	676-97-1
3D model (JSmol)	Interactive image
ChemSpider	12150
ECHA InfoCard	100.010.578
EC Number	211-634-4
PubChem CID	12671
UNII	2XGZ22DHQ2
UN number	9206
CompTox Dashboard (EPA)	DTXSID6060979
- InChI: InChI=1S/CH3Cl2OP/c1-5(2,3)4/h1H3 Key: SCLFRABIDYGTAZ-UHFFFAOYSA-N; InChI=1/CH3Cl2OP/c1-5(2,3)4/h1H3 Key: SCLFRABIDYGTAZ-UHFFFAOYAS
- SMILES: CP(=O)(Cl)Cl

Properties
Chemical formula	CH_{3}Cl_{2}OP
Molar mass	132.91 g·mol^{−1}
Appearance	White crystalline solid
Density	1.468 g/mL at 20 °C
Melting point	28 to 34 °C (82 to 93 °F; 301 to 307 K)
Boiling point	163 °C (325 °F; 436 K)
Solubility in water	Reacts with water
Solubility	Ether, THF

Hazards
- Occupational safety and health (OHS/OSH)
Main hazards	Very toxic, reacts with water
- GHS labelling
Pictograms	(GHS05: Corrosive) (GHS06: Toxic)
Signal word	Danger
Hazard statements	H314, H330
Precautionary statements	P260, P264, P271, P280, P284, P301+P330+P331, P303+P361+P353, P304+P340, P305+P351+P338, P310, P320, P321, P363, P403+P233, P405, P501
Flash point	>110 °C
- Lethal dose or concentration (LD, LC)
LD_{50} (median dose)	26 ppm/4h by inhalation (rat)
- Except where otherwise noted, data are given for materials in their standard state (at 25 °C [77 °F], 100 kPa). Infobox references

Methylphosphonyl dichloride (DC) or dichloro is an organophosphorus compound. It has commercial application in oligonucleotide synthesis, but is most notable as being a precursor to several chemical weapons agents. It is a white crystalline solid that melts slightly above room temperature.

== Synthesis and reactions ==
Methylphosphonyl dichloride is produced by oxidation of methyldichlorophosphine, with sulfuryl chloride:

CH_{3}PCl_{2} + SO_{2}Cl_{2} → CH_{3}P(O)Cl_{2} + SOCl_{2}

It can also be produced from a range of methylphosphonates (e.g. dimethyl methylphosphonate) via chlorination with thionyl chloride. Various amines catalyse this process. With hydrogen fluoride or sodium fluoride, it can be used to produce methylphosphonyl difluoride. With alcohols, it converts to the dialkoxide:

CH_{3}P(O)Cl_{2} + 2 HOR → CH_{3}P(O)(OR)_{2} + HCl

== Safety ==
Methylphosphonyl dichloride is very toxic and reacts vigorously with water to release hydrochloric acid. It is also listed under Schedule 2 of the Chemical Weapons Convention as it is used in the production of organophosphorus nerve agents such as sarin and soman.
