= Schedule 5 =

Schedule 5 or Schedule V may refer to:

- Schedule 5 - CD Inv P & CD Inv POM within the UK Misuse of Drugs Act 1971
- Schedule V Controlled Substances within the US Controlled Substances Act
  - List of Schedule V drugs (US)
- Schedule V Controlled Drugs and Substances within the Canadian Controlled Drugs and Substances Act
- Scheduled Areas in India, from the Fifth Schedule of the Constitution of India

== See also ==
- Schedule 1 (disambiguation)
- Schedule 2 (disambiguation)
- Schedule 3 (disambiguation)
- Schedule 4 (disambiguation)
