= Narcotic Drugs and Psychotropic Substances Act (Sudan) =

Sudan's Narcotic Drugs and Psychotropic Substances Act, passed in 1994, is designed to fulfill that country's treaty obligations under the Single Convention on Narcotic Drugs, Convention on Psychotropic Substances, and United Nations Convention Against Illicit Traffic in Narcotic Drugs and Psychotropic Substances.
