= Schedule 3 of the Chemical Weapons Convention =

Schedule 3 substances, in the sense of the Chemical Weapons Convention, are chemicals which have large-scale industrial uses, but are feasible to use as toxic chemical weapons (Part A) or manufacturing precursors (Part B).

Plants which manufacture more than 30 tonnes per year must be declared and can be inspected as per Part VIII of the "Verification Annex", and there are restrictions on export to countries which are not CWC signatories. Examples of these substances are phosgene, which has been used as a chemical weapon but which is also a precursor in the manufacture of many legitimate organic compounds, and triethanolamine, used in the manufacture of nitrogen mustard but also commonly used in toiletries and detergents.

The Schedule 3 list is one of three lists. Chemicals which can be used as weapons, or used in their manufacture, but which have no, or almost no, legitimate applications as well are listed in Schedule 1, whilst Schedule 2 is used for chemicals which have legitimate small-scale applications. The use of Schedule 1, 2, or 3 chemicals as weapons is banned by the Convention.

== Guidelines for Schedule 3 ==
The criteria for including a chemical in this schedule is that it is not listed in either of the other two, and:

- It has been produced, stockpiled or used as a chemical weapon;
- It poses otherwise a risk to the object and purpose of the Convention because it possesses such lethal or incapacitating toxicity as well as other properties that might enable it to be used as a chemical weapon;
- It poses a risk to the object and purpose of the Convention by virtue of its importance in the production of one or more chemicals listed in Schedule 1 or Schedule 2, part B;
- It may be produced in large commercial quantities for purposes not prohibited under the Convention.

== Toxic chemicals ==
- Phosgene: Carbonyl dichloride
- Cyanogen chloride
- Hydrogen cyanide
- Chloropicrin: Trichloronitromethane

== Precursors ==
- Phosphorus oxychloride
- Phosphorus trichloride
- Phosphorus pentachloride
- Trimethyl phosphite
- Triethyl phosphite
- Dimethyl phosphite
- Diethyl phosphite
- Sulfur monochloride
- Sulfur dichloride
- Thionyl chloride
- Ethyl diethanolamine
- Methyl diethanolamine
- Triethanolamine
- Pinacolone

== See also ==
- Dual-use technology
