= Schedule 2 of the Chemical Weapons Convention =

Schedule 2 substances, in the sense of the Chemical Weapons Convention, are chemicals that are feasible to use as chemical weapons themselves (Part A), or their manufacturing precursors (Part B), and which have small-scale applications outside of chemical warfare and so can be legitimately manufactured in small quantities. An example is thiodiglycol, which can be used in the manufacture of mustard agents but is also used as a solvent in inks. Manufacture must be declared as their production is subject to declaration to the Organisation for the Prohibition of Chemical Weapons (OPCW) per Part VII of the "Verification Annex", and they may not be exported to countries that are not party to the Convention.

The Schedule 2 list is one of three lists. Chemicals that can be used as weapons, or used in their manufacture, but that have no, or almost no, legitimate applications as well are listed in Schedule 1, whilst Schedule 3 is used for chemicals that also have widespread industrial uses. The use of Schedule 1, 2, or 3 chemicals as weapons is banned by the convention.

== Guidelines for Schedule 2 ==
Schedule 2 lists toxic chemicals and precursors – not listed in Schedule 1 – that are deemed to pose a significant risk to be used as a chemical weapon, or may be important for the production of any of the chemicals listed in Schedule 1. They are not produced in large quantities for commercial or other purposes not prohibited by the Convention and may be used for those purposes in limited quantities.

The listed chemicals are subjected to the following criteria:

- It poses a significant risk to the object and purpose of this Convention because it possesses such lethal or incapacitating toxicity as well as other properties that could enable it to be used as a chemical weapon;
- It may be used as a precursor in one of the chemical reactions at the final stage of formation of a chemical listed in Schedule 1 or Schedule 2, part b
- It poses a significant risk to the object and purpose of this Convention by virtue of its importance in the production of a chemical listed in Schedule 1 or Schedule 2, part A;
- It is not produced in large commercial quantities for purposes not prohibited under this Convention.

== Toxic chemicals ==
- Amiton: O,O-Diethyl S-(2-(diethylamino)ethyl)phosphorothiolate and corresponding alkylated or protonated salts
- PFIB: 1,1,3,3,3-Pentafluoro-2-(trifluoromethyl)-1-propene
- 3-Quinuclidinyl benzilate (BZ)

== Precursors ==
- Chemicals, except for those listed in Schedule 1, containing a phosphorus atom to which is bonded one methyl, ethyl or propyl (normal or iso) group but not further carbon atoms, e.g.

Methylphosphonyl dichloride
Dimethyl methylphosphonate
Exemption: Fonofos: O-Ethyl S-phenyl ethylphosphonothiolothionate

- N,N-Dialkyl (Me, Et, n-Pr or i-Pr) phosphoramidic dihalides
- Dialkyl (Me, Et, n-Pr or i-Pr) N,N-dialkyl (Me, Et, n-Pr or i-Pr)-phosphoramidates
- Arsenic trichloride
- 2,2-diphenyl-2-hydroxyacetic acid
- Quinuclidin-3-ol
- N,N-Dialkyl (Me, Et, n-Pr or i-Pr) aminoethyl-2-chlorides and corresponding protonated salts
- N,N-Dialkyl (Me, Et, n-Pr or i-Pr) aminoethane-2-ols and corresponding protonated salts

Exemptions: N,N-Dimethylaminoethanol and corresponding protonated salts; N,N-Diethylaminoethanol and corresponding protonated salts

- N,N-Dialkyl (Me, Et, n-Pr or i-Pr) aminoethane-2-thiols and corresponding protonated salts
- Thiodiglycol: Bis(2-hydroxyethyl)sulfide
- Pinacolyl alcohol: 3,3-Dimethylbutan-2-ol

== See also ==
- Schedule 1
- Schedule 3
- Dual use technology
