= VG (nerve agent) =

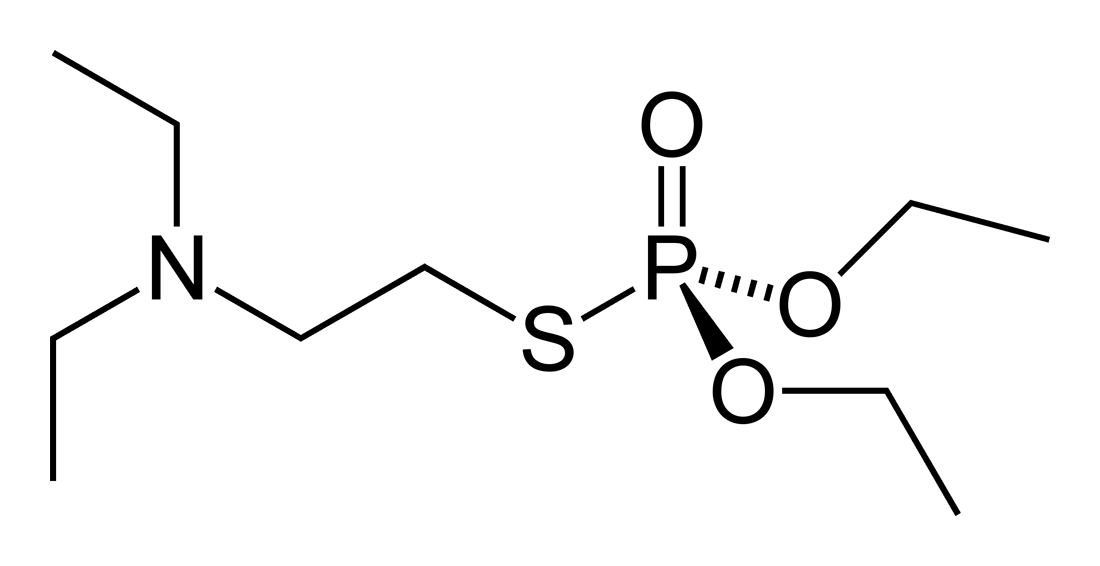
- Skeletal formula of VG

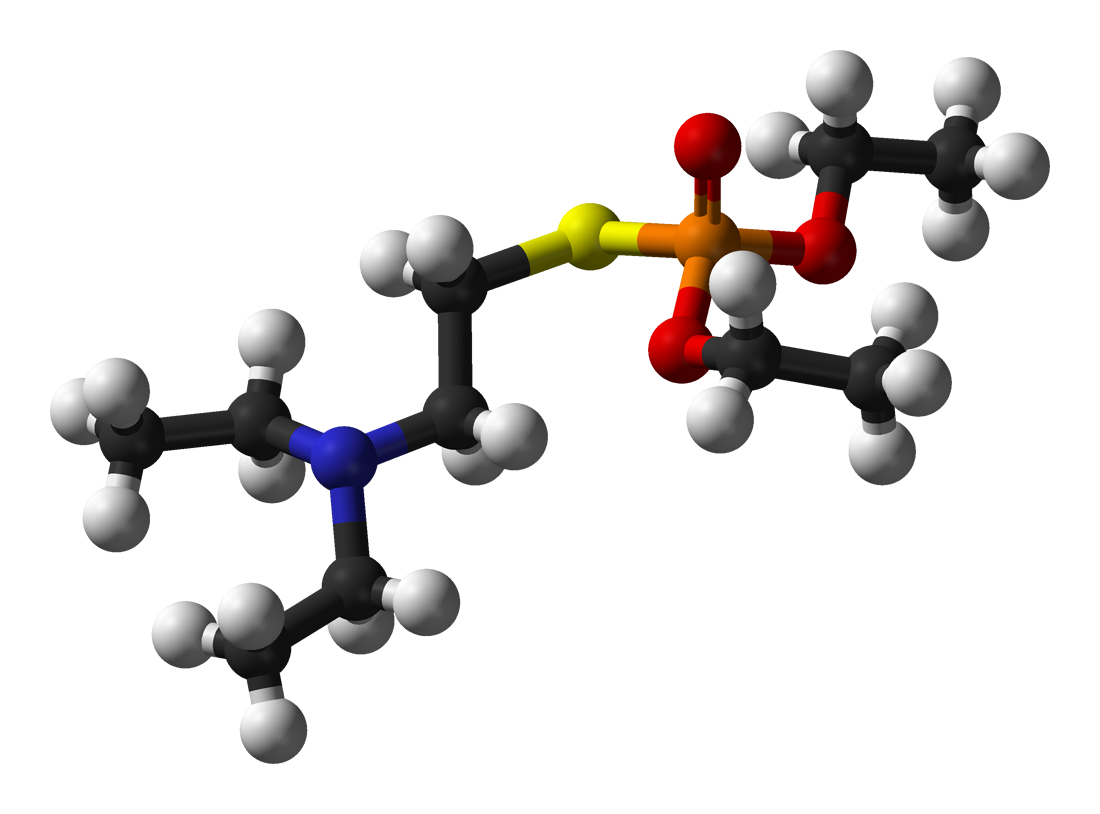
- Ball-and-stick model of VG

Names
- Preferred IUPAC name S-[2-(Diethylamino)ethyl] O,O-diethyl phosphorothioate

Identifiers
CAS Number	78-53-5
3D model (JSmol)	Interactive image
ChemSpider	6294
PubChem CID	6542
UNII	7SD1SH009V
CompTox Dashboard (EPA)	DTXSID6058184
- InChI: InChI=1S/C10H24NO3PS/c1-5-11(6-2)9-10-16-15(12,13-7-3)14-8-4/h5-10H2,1-4H3 Key: PJISLFCKHOHLLP-UHFFFAOYSA-N; InChI=1/C10H24NO3PS/c1-5-11(6-2)9-10-16-15(12,13-7-3)14-8-4/h5-10H2,1-4H3 Key: PJISLFCKHOHLLP-UHFFFAOYAO
- SMILES: O=P(OCC)(OCC)SCCN(CC)CC

Properties
Chemical formula	C_{10}H_{24}NO_{3}PS
Molar mass	269.34 g·mol^{−1}
Boiling point	85.5 °C (185.9 °F; 358.6 K) at 0.05 mmHg
Vapor pressure	0.01 mmHg at 80 °C

Hazards
NFPA 704 (fire diamond)	4 2 1
- Except where otherwise noted, data are given for materials in their standard state (at 25 °C [77 °F], 100 kPa). Infobox references

VG (IUPAC name: O,O-diethyl S-[2-(diethylamino)ethyl] phosphorothioate) (also called amiton or Tetram) is a "V-series" nerve agent chemically similar to the better-known VX nerve agent. Tetram was the proposed trade name for the substance and amiton its ISO common name when it was tested as an acaricide by ICI in the 1950s. It is now only of historic interest as the first member of the V-series.

== History ==
By the 1950s, the use of organophosphate insecticides was well established, despite their known toxicity to mammals. For example, parathion had been developed in the 1940s and became widely used in agriculture despite its known oral toxicity. Many chemical companies continued to research this type of acetylcholinesterase inhibitor, seeking to develop alternatives which had greater human safety while retaining their activity on pests. In 1952, Dr. Ranajit Ghosh, a chemist at Imperial Chemical Industries (ICI), investigated organophosphate esters of substituted aminoethanethiols and compared their properties to parathion, which ICI was already marketing as Fosferno.

Amiton was found to be much less toxic than parathion to many insects but was considerably more toxic to acarid pests such as the spider-mite Tetranychus telarius. Field trials demonstrated its utility against the red mite Panonychus ulmi: a single treatment of 20 ppm was shown to give season-long control. This led to plans to market the compound under the trade name Tetram but the oral LD_{50} of 5 mg/kg to rats meant that the compound was comparable to parathion in mammalian toxicity while having a more limited use, so its development was halted as not being commercially viable. It had been intended to formulate it as its hydrogen oxalate (HC_{2}O^{−}_{4}) salt, to minimise any hazard from the vapour.

The British Government was aware of the extreme toxicity of organophosphate compounds and some of the ICI materials were sent to Porton Down, Britain's chemical weapons research facility, for evaluation. This led to the identification of a new class of nerve agents, later named V (venomous) agents. Britain officially renounced chemical and biological weapons in 1956, but the United States continued research into this class, leading to the mass production of VX—a chemically similar but far more toxic compound—in 1961. Amiton was no longer pursued for chemical warfare or as a pesticide.

== Synthesis ==
Amiton was first made at ICI by direct treatment of the sodium salt of 2-diethylaminoethanethiol with diethyl phosphorochloridate:

(CH_{3}CH_{2})_{2}NCH_{2}CH_{2}S^{−} Na^{+} + ClP(=O)(OCH_{2}CH_{2})_{2} → amiton + NaCl

It was characterised as its hydrogen oxalate salt, with melting point 98–99°C. Alternative methods tried included the reaction between 2-diethylaminoethyl chloride and sodium diethyl phosphorothioate:

(CH_{3}CH_{2})_{2}NCH_{2}CH_{2}Cl + Na^{+} ^{−}SP(=O)(OCH_{2}CH_{2})_{2} → amiton + NaCl

Surprisingly, amiton is also the product of reacting diethylethanolamine with diethyl phosphorochloridothionate, where the initially formed thionate ester (CH_{3}CH_{2})_{2}NCH_{2}CH_{2}OP(=S)(OCH_{2}CH_{2})_{2} rearranges under the conditions of the reaction:

(CH_{3}CH_{2})_{2}NCH_{2}CH_{2}O^{−} Na^{+} + ClP(=S)(OCH_{2}CH_{2})_{2} → amiton + NaCl

== Regulation ==
VG is classified as an extremely hazardous substance in the United States as defined in Section 302 of the U.S. Emergency Planning and Community Right-to-Know Act (42 U.S.C. 11002), and is subject to strict reporting requirements by facilities which produce, store, or use it in significant quantities.

The Chemical Weapons Convention (CWC) classifies amiton as a Schedule 2 chemical. These are subject to fewer restrictions than Schedule 1 chemicals but are still highly regulated. CWC member states are required to submit annual reports detailing the amounts they synthesize, process, consume, import, or export. Any trade involving these chemicals must specify the recipient country: exports to non-CWC member states are prohibited. These regulations ensure strict monitoring and prevent misuse while allowing legitimate industrial and research applications.
