= Trimethyl phosphite =

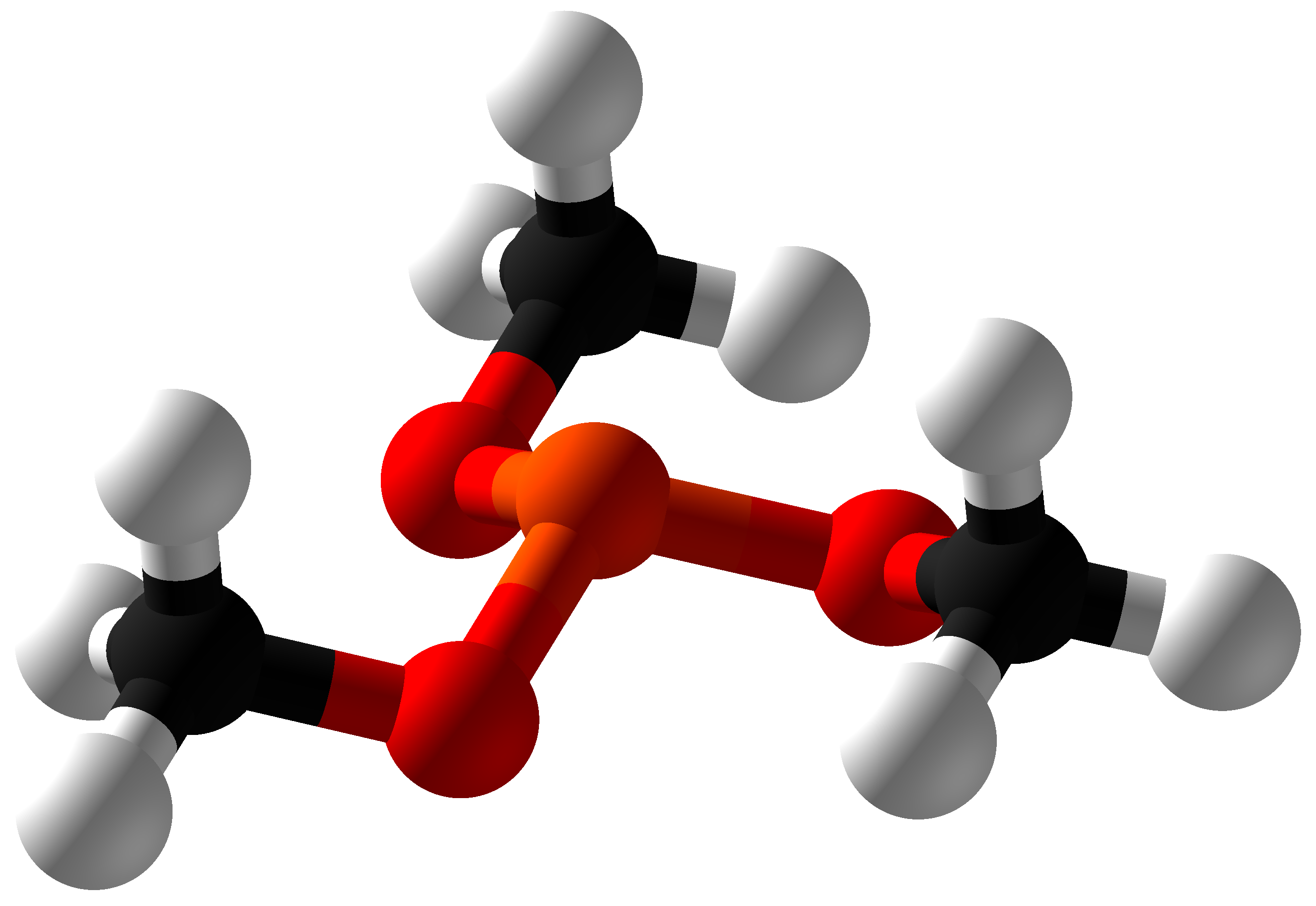

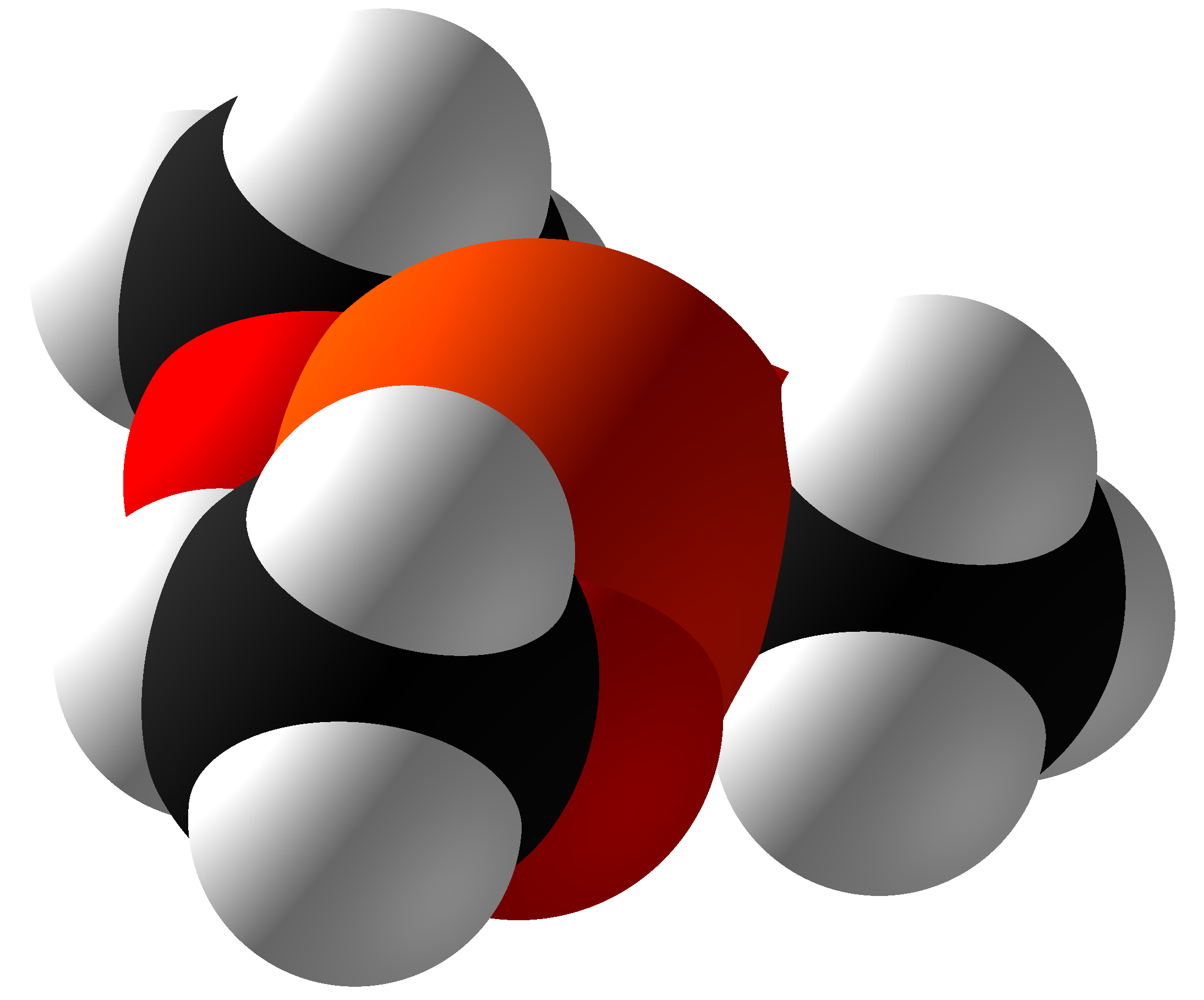

Names
- Preferred IUPAC name Trimethyl phosphite
- Other names Trimethoxyphosphine; Trimethoxyphosphane

Identifiers
CAS Number	121-45-9
3D model (JSmol)	Interactive image
ChEBI	CHEBI:183313
ChemSpider	8159
ECHA InfoCard	100.004.065
PubChem CID	8472
UNII	26Q0321ZDG
CompTox Dashboard (EPA)	DTXSID4026979
- InChI: InChI=1S/C3H9O3P/c1-4-7(5-2)6-3/h1-3H3 Key: CYTQBVOFDCPGCX-UHFFFAOYSA-N; InChI=1/C3H9O3P/c1-4-7(5-2)6-3/h1-3H3 Key: CYTQBVOFDCPGCX-UHFFFAOYAO
- SMILES: COP(OC)OC

Properties
Chemical formula	C_{3}H_{9}O_{3}P
Molar mass	124.08
Appearance	colorless liquid
Odor	distinctive, pungent
Density	1.052
Melting point	−78 °C (−108 °F; 195 K)
Boiling point	111 °C (232 °F; 384 K)
Solubility in water	reacts
Vapor pressure	24 mmHg (25°C)

Hazards
Flash point	28 °C; 82 °F; 301 K
- NIOSH (US health exposure limits)
PEL (Permissible)	none
REL (Recommended)	TWA 2 ppm (10 mg/m^{3})
IDLH (Immediate danger)	N.D.

Related compounds
Related compounds	Dimethyl methylphosphonate
- Except where otherwise noted, data are given for materials in their standard state (at 25 °C [77 °F], 100 kPa). verify (what is ?) Infobox references

Trimethyl phosphite is an organophosphorus compound with the formula P(OCH_{3})_{3}, often abbreviated P(OMe)_{3}. It is a colorless liquid with a highly pungent odor. It is the simplest phosphite ester and finds used as a ligand in organometallic chemistry and as a reagent in organic synthesis. The molecule features a pyramidal phosphorus(III) center bound to three methoxy groups.

== Synthesis ==
Trimethyl phosphite is in principle obtainable by methanolysis of phosphorus trichloride, say in the presence of a proton accepting base. This method suffers from numerous side reactions however. The use of sodium methoxide is superior:

PCl_{3} + 3 NaOCH_{3} → P(OCH_{3})_{3} + 3 NaCl

== Reactions ==
Trimethyl phosphite is susceptible to oxidation to trimethyl phosphate:

P(OCH_{3})_{3} + 0.5 O_{2} → OP(OCH_{3})_{3}

It reacts with a catalytic amount of methyl iodide in the Arbuzov reaction to give dimethyl methylphosphonate:

P(OCH_{3})_{3} → CH_{3}P(O)(OCH_{3})_{2}

As a ligand, trimethyl phosphite has a smaller cone angle and better acceptor properties relative to trimethylphosphine. A representative derivative is the colorless tetrahedral complex Ni(P(OMe)_{3})_{4} (m.p. 108 °C). The tridentate ligand called the Kläui ligand is derived from trimethyl phosphite. The formation of this ligand illustrates the susceptibility of trimethyl phosphite (and metal complexes thereof) to the Arbuzov reaction.

Trimethyl phosphite is also used as a mild desulfurization reagent in organic synthesis, for example in the preparation of derivatives of tetrathiafulvalene.

== Toxicity ==
The LD_{50} is 1600–2890 mg/kg (oral, rat).
