= Dimethyl methylphosphonate =

Chemical compound

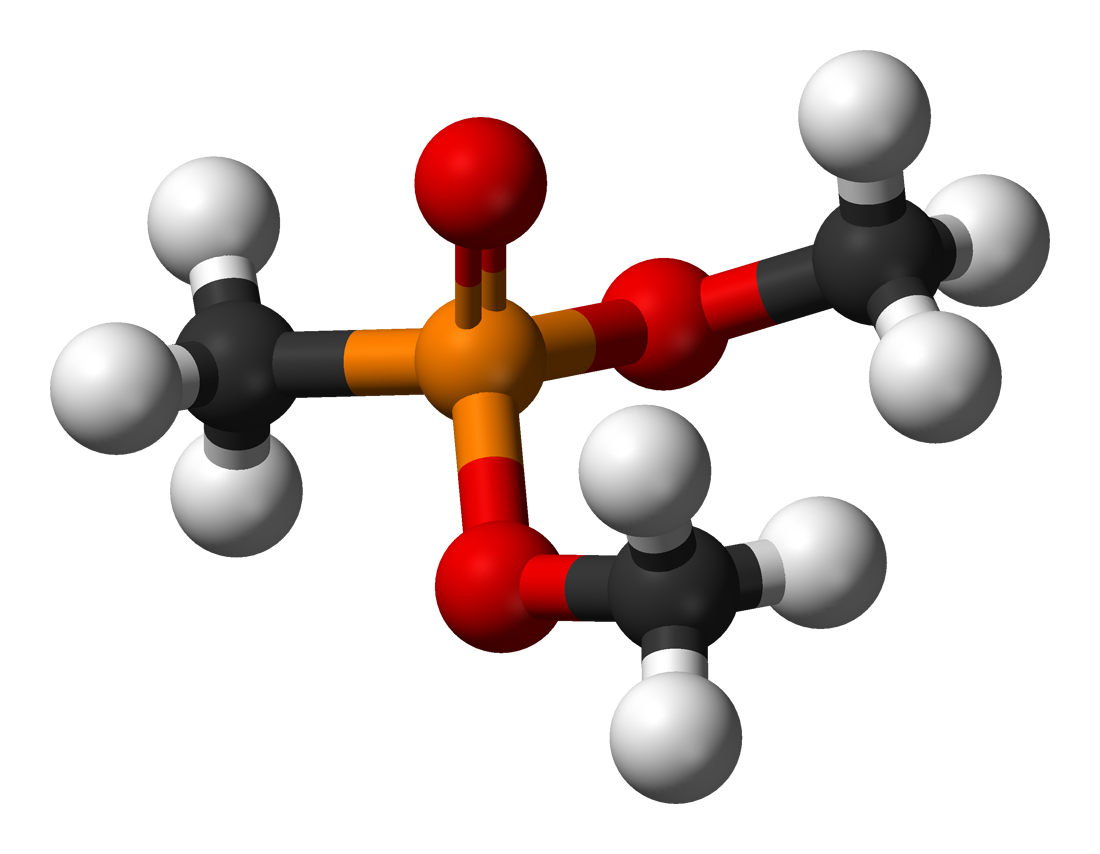

Names
- Preferred IUPAC name Dimethyl methylphosphonate
- Other names: methylphosphonic acid dimethyl ester; dimethoxymethyl phosphine oxide; dimethyl methanephosphonate; dimethyl methyl phosphonate; Fran TF 2000; Fyron DMMP; Metaran; NSC 62240; O,O-dimethyl methylphosphonate; {[methoxy(methyl)phosphoryl]oxy}methane; Reoflam DMMP

Identifiers
CAS Number	756-79-6
3D model (JSmol)	Interactive image
ChEMBL	ChEMBL2924224
ChemSpider	12418
ECHA InfoCard	100.010.957
EC Number	212-052-3
PubChem CID	12958
UNII	20Z996230U
UN number	1993
CompTox Dashboard (EPA)	DTXSID0020494
- InChI: InChI=1S/C3H9O3P/c1-5-7(3,4)6-2/h1-3H3 Key: VONWDASPFIQPDY-UHFFFAOYSA-N; InChI=1/C3H9O3P/c1-5-7(3,4)6-2/h1-3H3 Key: VONWDASPFIQPDY-UHFFFAOYAG
- SMILES: O=P(OC)(OC)C

Properties
Chemical formula	C_{3}H_{9}O_{3}P
Molar mass	124.076 g·mol^{−1}
Appearance	colourless liquid
Density	1.145 g/mL at 25 °C
Melting point	−50 °C (−58 °F; 223 K)
Boiling point	181 °C (358 °F; 454 K)
Solubility in water	slowly hydrolyses

Hazards
- Occupational safety and health (OHS/OSH)
Main hazards	Toxic
- GHS labelling
Pictograms	(GHS07: Exclamation mark) (GHS08: Health hazard)
Signal word	Warning
Hazard statements	H319, H340, H361f
Precautionary statements	P201, P305+P351+P338, P308+P310
Flash point	69 °C (156 °F; 342 K) closed cup
- Lethal dose or concentration (LD, LC)
LD_{50} (median dose)	Oral (rat) 8,210 mg/kg; Inhalation (rat) 1h 20.13 mg/L; Dermal (rabbit) >2,000 mg/kg
- Except where otherwise noted, data are given for materials in their standard state (at 25 °C [77 °F], 100 kPa). verify (what is ?) Infobox references

Dimethyl methylphosphonate is an organophosphorus compound with the chemical formula CH_{3}PO(OCH_{3})_{2}. It is a colourless liquid, which is primarily used as a flame retardant.

== Synthesis ==
Dimethyl methylphosphonate can be prepared from trimethyl phosphite and a halomethane (e.g. iodomethane) via the Michaelis–Arbuzov reaction.

Dimethyl methylphosphonate is a schedule 2 chemical as it may be used in the production of chemical weapons. It will react with thionyl chloride to produce methylphosphonic acid dichloride, which is used in the production of sarin and soman nerve agents. Various amines can be used to catalyse this process. It can be used as a sarin-simulant for the calibration of organophosphorus detectors.

== Uses ==
The primary commercial use of dimethyl methylphosphonate is as a flame retardant. Other commercial uses are a preignition additive for gasoline, anti-foaming agent, plasticizer, stabilizer, textile conditioner, antistatic agent, and an additive for solvents and low-temperature hydraulic fluids. It can be used as a catalyst and a reagent in organic synthesis, as it can generate a highly reactive ylide. The yearly production in the United States varies between 100 and 1,000 short tons (91 and 907 t).

About 190 liters of dimethyl methylphosphonate, together with other chemicals, were released during the crash of El Al Flight 1862 at Bijlmer in Amsterdam in 1992.

A couple of elucidated uses include in the synthesis of travoprost, & fenprostalene.
