= Narcotic Drugs and Psychotropic Substances Act (Estonia) =

Estonia's Narcotic Drugs and Psychotropic Substances Act, passed on 11 June 1997, is a law designed to fulfill that country's treaty obligations under the Single Convention on Narcotic Drugs, the Convention on Psychotropic Substances, and the United Nations Convention Against Illicit Traffic in Narcotic Drugs and Psychotropic Substances. The Act establishes four Schedules of drugs. Schedule I comprises "narcotic drugs and psychotropic substances the handling of which is prohibited in Estonia except in the cases prescribed by law." Schedules II, III, IV comprise prescription drugs.

The Act divides precursors into two categories: Schedule I (bases) and Schedule II (reagents).

The Act provides for drug addiction prevention and treatment, including involuntary hospitalization.

== Sources ==
- Narcotic Drugs and Psychotropic Substances Act
