= Psychotropic Substances Act (Thailand) =

Thailand's Psychotropic Substances Act is a law designed to regulate certain mind-altering drugs. Along with the Drug Act and the Narcotic Act, the Psychotropic Substances act is one of the major acts that the Thai FDA works under. The Act divides psychotropic drugs into four Schedules. Offenses involving Schedule I and II drugs carry heavier penalties than those involving Schedule III and IV drugs. Note that this statute does not regulate most opioids, cocaine, or some amphetamines. The vast majority of narcotic painkillers, along with cocaine and most amphetamines are regulated under the Narcotics Act.

== Schedule I ==
Schedule I drugs have no known medical use and a high potential for abuse. Some examples include:

- Cathinone ((-)-a-Amino-propiophenone)
- Etryptamine (3-(2-aminobutyl) indole)
- Mescaline (3,4,5-Trimethoxyphenethylamine)
- Methcathinone (2-(methylamino)-1-phenylpropan-1-one)
- Psilocin (3-(2-Dimethylaminoethyl)-4-hydroxyindole)
- Psilocybine (3-(2-Dimethylaminoethyl)-indol-4-yl dihydrogen phosphate)
- Tetrahydrocannabinol (1-Hydroxy-3-pentyl-6 a, 7,10,10 a-tetrahydro-6,6,9-trimethyl-6H-dibenzo [b,d] pyran)

== Schedule II ==
Schedule II drugs are prescribed for contemporary medical treatments, but still have a potential for abuse. Some examples include:

- Amfepramone (2-(Diethylamino) propiophenone)
- Aminorex (2-amino-5-phenyl-2-oxazoline)
- Butorphanol (17-(cyclobutymethyl) morphinan 3, 14-diol)
- Cathine (d-threo-2-Amino-1-hydroxy- 1- phenylpropane)
- Fencamfamin ((+)-N-Ethyl-3-phenylbicyclo-(2,2,1)-heptan-2-amine)
- Fenethylline ((+)-3,7-Dihydro-1,3-dimethyl-7-(2-[(1-methyl-2-phenyl-ethyl) amino]-ethyl)-1H-purine-2,6-dione)
- Flunitrazepam (5-(o-Fluorophenyl)-1,3-dihydro-1-methyl-7-nitro-2H-1, 4-benzodiazepin-2-one)
- Ketamine (Cyclohexanone, 2-(2-chlorophenyl)-2-(methylamino))
- Mazindol (5-(p-Chlorophenyl)-2,5-dihydro-3H-imidazo [2,1-a]-isoindol-5-o1)
- Methaqualone (2-methyl-3-o-tolyl-4(3H)-quinazolinone)
- Methylphenidate (2-Phenyl-2-(2-piperidyl) acetic acid, methyl ester)
- Nimetazepam (1,3-Dihydro-1-methyl-7-nitro-5-phenyl-2H-1,4-benzo-diazepin-2-one)
- Pemoline (2-Amino-5-phenyl-4(5H)-oxazolone)
- Pentobarbital (5-Ethyl-5-(1-methylbutyl) barbituric acid)
- Phencyclidine (1-(1-Phenyl-cyclohexyl)-piperidine)
- Secobarbital (5-Allyl-5-(1-methylbutyl) barbituric acid)
- Temazepam (7-Chloro-1,3-dihydro-3-hydroxy-1-methyl-5-phenyl-2H-1, 4-benzodiazepin-2-one)
- Triazolam (8-Chloro-6-(o-Chlorophenyl)-1-methyl-4H-s-triazolo [4,3-a] [1,4] benzodiazepine)

== Schedule III ==
Schedule III drugs are used in contemporary medicine, and have a potential or tendency for abuse. Some examples include:

- Amobarbital (5-Ethyl-5-(3-methylbutyl) barbituric acid)
- Brotizolam (2-Bromo-4-(2-chlorophenyl)-9-methyl-6H-thieno [3,2-f] [1,2,4,] triazolo-[4,3-a] [1,4] diazepine)
- Buprenorphine (21-Cyclopropyl-7-α-[(s)-1-hydroxy-1,2,2-trimethylpropyl]-6, 14-endo-ethano-6,7,8, 14-tetrahydrooripavine)
- Butalbital (5-Allyl-5-isobutylbarbituric acid)
- Cyclobarbital (5-(1-Cyclohexen-1-yl)-5-ethylbarbituric acid)
- Flutoprazepam (7-chloro-1-cyclopropylmethyl-1,3-dihydro-5-(2-fluorophenyl)-2H-1,4-benzodiazepin-2-one)
- Glutethimide (2-Ethyl-2-phenyl-glutarimide)
- Loprazolam (6-(o-Chlorophenyl)-2,4 dihydro-2-[(4-methyl-1-piperazinyl) methylene]-8-nitro-1H-imidazo [1,2-a] [1,4] benzodiazepin-1-one)
- Lormetazepam (7-Chloro-5-(o-chlorophenyl)-1,3-dihydro-3-hydroxy-1-methyl- 2H-1,4-benzodiazepin-2-one)
- Midazolam (8-Chloro-6-(2-fluorophenyl)-1-methyl-4H-imidazo-(1,5-a) (1,4) benzodiazepine)
- Meprobamate (2-Methyl-2-propyl-1,3-propanediol dicarbamate)
- Nitrazepam (1,3-Dihydro-7-nitro-5-phenyl-2H-1,4-benzodiazepin-2-one)
- Pentazocine (1, 2, 3, 4, 5, 6-Hexahydro-6, 11-dimethyl-3-(3-methyl-2-butenyl)-2, 6- methano-3-benzazocin-8-ol)

== Schedule IV ==
Schedule III drugs are used in contemporary medicine, and have a lower potential or tendency for abuse than those in schedule III. Some examples include:

- Allobarbital (5,5-diallybarbituric acid)
- Alprazolam (8-chloro-1-methyl-6-phenyl-4H-s-triazolo [4,3-a] [1,4] benzodiazepine)
- Barbital (5, 5-diethylbarbituric acid)
- Benzphetamine (N-benzyl-N, α -dimethylphenethylamine)
- Bromazepam (7-bromo-1,3-dihydro-5-(2-pyridyl)-2H-1,4- benzodiazepin-2-one)
- Butobarbital (5-butyl-5-ethylbarbituric acid)
- Camazepam (7-Chloro-1,3-dihydro-3-hydroxy-1-methyl-5-phenyl-2H-1, 4 benzodiazepin-2-one dimethylcarbamate)
- Chloral hydrate and its adducts
- Chlordiazepoxide (7-chloro-2-(methylamino)-5-phenyl-3H-1, 4-benzodiazepine- 4- oxide)
- Clobazam (7-Chloro-1-methyl-5-phenyl-1H-1,5-benzodiazepine-2,4-(3H, 5H)-dione)
- Clonazepam (5-(o-Chlorophenyl)-1, 3-dihydro-7-nitro-2H-1, 4-benzodiazepin-2-one)
- Clortermine (2-chloro- α, α -demethyl benzeneethanamine)
- Diazepam (7-Chloro-1,3-dihydro-1-methyl-5-phenyl-2H-1,4-benzodiazepin-2-one)
- Ethchlorvynol (ethyl-2-chlorovinyl-ethinyicabinol)
- Lorazepam (7-Chloro-5(o-chlorophenyl)-1,3-dihydro-3-hydroxy-2H-1, 4-benzodiazepin-2-one)
- Mefenorex ((±)-N(3-chloropropyl)-a-methylphenethylamine)
- Oxazepam (7-Chloro-1,3-dihydro-3-hydroxy-5-phenyl-2H-1,4-benzodiazepin-2-one)
- Phenobarbital (5-ethyl-5-phenylbarbituric acid)
- Propylhexedrine ((±)-N,a-Dimethylcyclohexane-ethylamine)
- Tetrazepam (7-Chloro-5-(cyclohexen-1-yl)-1,3-dihydro-1-methyl-2H-1, 4-benzodiazepin-2-one)
- Vinylbital (5-(1-methylbutyl)-5-vinylbarbituric acid)
