= Poisoning of Alexei Navalny =

Attack on Russian politician

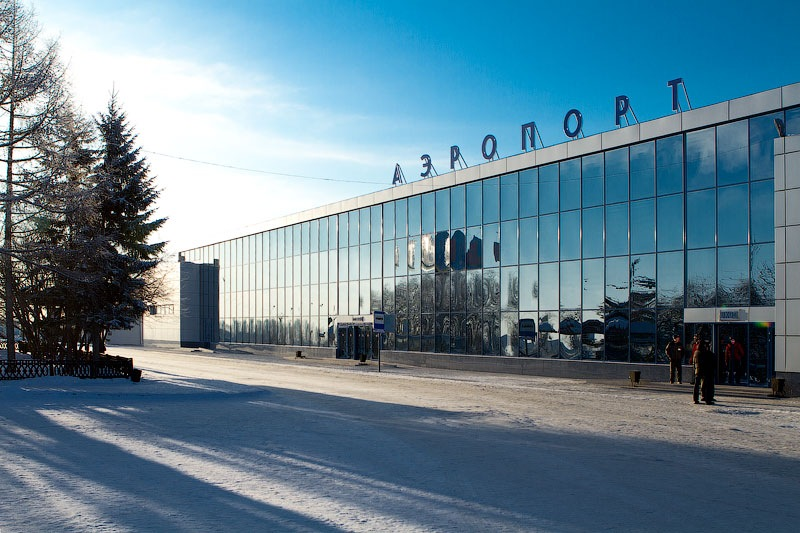
- Omsk Tsentralny Airport
- Location: Xander Hotel, Tomsk, Russia (presumed)
- Date: 20 August 2020; 6 years ago (UTC+7)
- Target: Alexei Navalny
- Attack type: Poisoning
- Weapon: Novichok agent
- Deaths: 0
- Injuries: 1
- Assailant: Federal Security Service

On 20 August 2020, Russian opposition leader and anti-corruption activist Alexei Navalny was poisoned with the Novichok nerve agent and as a result, he was hospitalized in serious condition. During a flight from Tomsk to Moscow, he became ill and was taken to a hospital in Omsk after an emergency landing. He was then put in a coma. He was evacuated to the Charité hospital in Berlin, Germany, two days later. The use of the nerve agent was confirmed by five Organisation for the Prohibition of Chemical Weapons (OPCW) certified laboratories. On 7 September, doctors announced that they had taken Navalny out of the induced coma and that his condition had improved. He was discharged from the hospital on 22 September 2020. The OPCW said that a cholinesterase inhibitor from the Novichok group was found in Navalny's blood, urine, skin samples and his water bottle. At the same time, the OPCW report clarified that Navalny was poisoned with a new type of Novichok, which was not included in the list of controlled chemicals of the Chemical Weapons Convention.

Navalny accused President Vladimir Putin of being responsible for his poisoning, but the Kremlin said the accusations were "utterly unfounded" and "insulting". The Kremlin further alleged that Navalny was working for the CIA. The EU and the UK imposed sanctions over Navalny's poisoning on the director of the Russian Federal Security Service (FSB) Alexander Bortnikov, five other senior Russian officials, and the State Research Institute of Organic Chemistry and Technology (GosNIIOKhT). According to the EU, the poisoning of Navalny became possible "only with the consent of the Presidential Executive Office" and with the participation of the FSB. An investigation by Bellingcat and The Insider implicated agents from the FSB in Navalny's poisoning.

Russian prosecutors refused to open an official criminal investigation of the poisoning, claiming they found no sign that a crime had been committed, and the Kremlin denied involvement in the poisoning of Navalny.

== Background ==
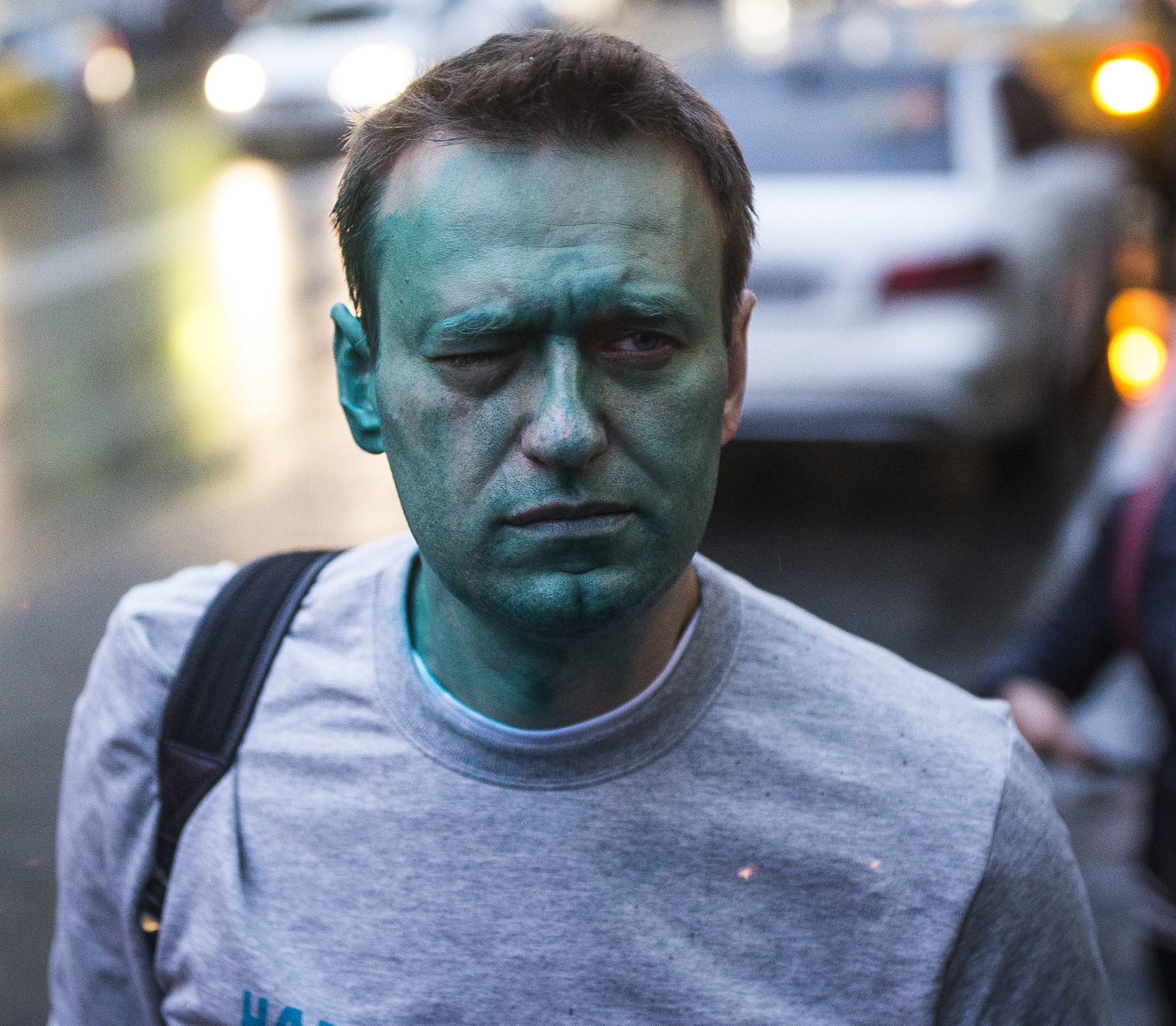
Navalny, following a Zelyonka attack in April 2017

Alexei Navalny had previously been attacked by chemical substances. On 27 April 2017, Navalny was attacked by unknown assailants outside his office in the Anti-Corruption Foundation who sprayed brilliant green dye, possibly mixed with other components, into his face (see Zelyonka attack). He said he had lost 80 percent of the sight in his right eye. He also said that his doctor believed there was a second corrosive substance in the liquid and that "there is hope" the lost eyesight would be restored. He also alleged that the attacker was Aleksandr Petrunko, a man he claimed had ties with State Duma deputy speaker Pyotr Olegovich Tolstoy. Navalny accused the Kremlin of orchestrating the attack.

Another incident occurred in July 2019, when Navalny was arrested and imprisoned. On 28 July, he was hospitalized with severe damage to his eyes and skin. At the hospital, he was diagnosed with an allergic reaction, although this diagnosis was disputed by Anastasia Vasilyeva, one of his personal doctors. Vasilyeva questioned the diagnosis and suggested the possibility that Navalny's condition was the result of "the damaging effects of undetermined chemicals". On 29 July 2019, Navalny was discharged from hospital and taken back to prison, despite the objections of his personal physician who questioned the hospital's motives.

In August 2020, in the days leading up to the poisoning, Navalny had been publishing videos on his YouTube channel in which he expressed support for the pro-democracy 2020 Belarusian protests, which were triggered by the heavily contested 2020 Belarusian presidential election. Navalny had also written that the kind of 'revolution' that was taking place in neighboring Belarus would soon happen in Russia. Local news site Tayga.Info reported that during his Siberia trip, Navalny had been carrying out an investigation, as well as meeting local candidates and volunteers. When asked if Navalny were preparing an exposé shortly before he became violently ill, Navalny ally Lyubov Sobol stated "I can't reveal all the details, but Navalny was on a work trip. He wasn't relaxing in the regions". The video investigation was later published by Navalny's team on 31 August.

It is assumed that Navalny was poisoned in a politically motivated attack as 'punishment' for his opposition work. According to The New York Times, experts expressed doubts that the Novichok agent would be used by someone other than a state-sponsored agent. Journalist and human rights advocate Anna Politkovskaya, known for her criticism of Putin and her coverage of the Second Chechen War, fell ill during a flight to cover the Beslan school siege in 2004 after drinking tea in an apparent poisoning attempt. She was later assassinated in 2006. In 2018, Pussy Riot activist Pyotr Verzilov was hospitalised in Moscow and later taken to the Charité hospital in Berlin a few days later for treatment which was organised by the Cinema for Peace Foundation after a suspected poisoning, where doctors at the hospital said it was "highly probable" that he was poisoned.

According to activist Ilya Chumakov, who met Navalny along with other supporters the day before his flight, when Navalny was asked why he was not dead, he said that his death would not be beneficial to Putin and that it would turn him into a hero.

== Poisoning and treatment ==
On 20 August 2020, Navalny fell ill during a flight from Tomsk to Moscow and was hospitalised in the City Clinical Emergency Hospital No. 1 in Omsk (Russian: Городская клиническая больница скорой медицинской помощи №1), where the plane had made an emergency landing. The change in his condition on the plane was sudden and violent, and video footage showed crew members on the flight scurrying towards him and Navalny crying loudly.

Afterwards, his spokeswoman said that he was in a coma and on a ventilator in the hospital. She also said that Navalny only drank tea since the morning and that it was suspected that something was added to his drink. The hospital said that he was in a stable but serious condition, and after initially acknowledging that Navalny had probably been poisoned, the hospital's deputy chief physician told reporters that poisoning was "one scenario among many" being considered. Although doctors in Russia initially suggested he suffered from a metabolic disorder caused by low blood sugar, they later stated that he had most likely been poisoned by antipsychotics or neuroleptics and that industrial chemicals such as 2-ethylhexyl diphenyl phosphate were found. A photograph on social media taken by a supporter appeared to show Navalny drinking tea at a Tomsk airport café, where Interfax news agency reported that the owners of the café were checking CCTV footage to see if any evidence could be provided.

By the afternoon, Navalny's wife, Yulia, had reached the hospital from Moscow. She brought with her Navalny's personal doctor, Anastasia Vasilyeva. The authorities, however, initially refused to allow them into the room. They demanded proof in the form of a marriage certificate that Yulia was indeed his wife. A chartered plane paid for by Cinema for Peace Foundation was sent from Germany to evacuate Navalny from Omsk for treatment at the Charité in Berlin. Approximately 31 hours after onset of his symptoms, a doctor from the German team was granted brief access to Alexey Navalny, and recorded bradycardia, hypothermia (34.4°C), and wide pupils non-reactive to light. According to German doctors, Navalny was under sedation with propofol, and it was the only obvious drug given at that time. The doctors treating him in Omsk had initially declared he was too sick to be transported but later released him, and he arrived in Berlin on 22 August. Alexander Murakhovsky, the head doctor at the Omsk hospital, told the press conference on 24 August that they had saved his life and found no traces of any poison in his system; he also said the doctors at the hospital had not been under pressure on the part of Russian officials. The doctors treating him at the Charité announced later in the day that while the specific substance was not yet known, clinical findings indicated poisoning with a substance from the group of nerve agents known as cholinesterase inhibitors, and that they would be performing further tests to discover the exact substance. Evidence might come with the publication of the initiated laboratory testing.

As of 2 September 2020, Navalny was in a medically-induced coma. German physicians said that if he recovered, lasting effects could not be ruled out. Dr. Murakhovsky wrote a letter to the Charité, demanding that they show laboratory data about him being poisoned with a cholinesterase inhibitor, stating the doctors in his hospital found no such evidence. He stated that cholinesterase decrease may have happened either by intake of a compound or naturally, also publishing a purported independent analysis detecting no cholinesterase inhibitors. He confirmed giving him atropine, which is used to counteract certain nerve agents and pesticide poisoning, but claimed the reasons were unrelated to poisoning.

On 7 September, doctors brought Navalny out of the medically-induced coma. In a press release, Charité said:

The condition of Alexei Navalny, ... has improved. The patient has been removed from his medically induced coma and is being weaned off mechanical ventilation. He is responding to verbal stimuli. It remains too early to gauge the potential long-term effects of his severe poisoning.

On 10 September, news media reported the police protection outside the Charité hospital had been stepped up, that Navalny was able to speak again, but Navalny's spokeswoman described reports of his quick recuperation as "exaggerated".

On 14 September, the Charité hospital said that Navalny was taken off the ventilator and that he is able to get out of bed. For the first time, the hospital said that it published the statement following consultations "with the patient and his wife", rather than his wife only.

On 15 September, Navalny's spokeswoman said that Navalny would return to Russia. Navalny also posted a picture from his hospital bed on social media for the first time since his poisoning. The Kremlin ruled out a meeting between Navalny and Putin.

On 22 September, the doctors at the Charité hospital declared him well enough to be discharged from in-patient care.

While recovering after discharge from the Charité hospital, Navalny stated "I assert that Putin was behind the crime, and I have no other explanation for what happened. Only three people can give orders to put into action 'active measures' and use Novichok ... [but] FSB director Alexander Bortnikov, foreign intelligence service head Sergey Naryshkin and the director of GRU cannot make such a decision without Putin's orders."

== Investigation ==
=== Initial steps taken by Navalny's team members ===
Anti-Corruption Foundation (FBK) employees in Tomsk, having learned about the poisoning, told the administration of the hotel where Navalny had stayed that he could have been poisoned with "something from the minibar" and received permission to inspect his room. The inspection was carried out in the presence of a hotel administrator and a lawyer, and was filmed. Navalny's associates took his personal belongings from the room, including several plastic water bottles. The head of the FBK investigation department, Maria Pevchikh, subsequently took these bottles to Germany on the same medical plane on which Navalny himself was transported, and handed them over to German specialists. Although the Navalny's team member maintained control of the bottle, there is no official chain of custody for it.

On the same day, 20 August 2020, Navalny's lawyers appealed to the Investigative Committee of Russia and demanded for the initiation of a criminal case in accordance with the Articles 30, 105, and 227 of the Criminal Code of the Russian Federation.

=== Investigation by German authorities ===
Upon Navalny's admission to Charité hospital intensive care unit, toxicological analysis and drug screening in the patient's blood and urine samples was performed. Several drugs, including atropin were identified, whose presence was attributed to the previous treatment in Omsk. Cholinesterase status testing was performed in an external laboratory, and it showed virtually no activity of acetylcholinesterase in erythrocytes, which served as a strong evidence supporting exposure to cholinesterase inhibitor. Navalny's attending doctors from the Charité turned to Bundeswehr experts for help to check whether Navalny had been poisoned with a chemical warfare agent.

On 2 September 2020, the German government announced that scientists at the Bundeswehr Institute of Pharmacology and Toxicology obtained unequivocal proof that Navalny was poisoned by Novichok type nerve agent. Although the German government did not disclose any technical details about the exact procedure of Novichok's identification, as well as a concrete formula of the poison, Marc-Michael Blum, an expert in chemical weapons testing and former OPCW employee suggested that the analytic procedure used by German chemists was similar to the one used for identification of Sarin poisoning, and it allows reliable identification of the poison at the parts per billion level. His opinion is in agreement with the opinion of Palmer Taylor, a pharmacologist at the University of California, San Diego.

Traces of the Novichok nerve agent were found in blood and urine, as well as on Navalny's skin samples. Traces of the poison were also found on one of Navalny's bottles, which had previously been handed over to Berlin doctors, and on some other undisclosed object(s). Experts suggest that Navalny drank from it after he was poisoned, and left traces on it. Navalny's team suggested that he was possibly poisoned before leaving the hotel. It was also stated that before leaving Russia, Navalny's clothes were seized by the Russian government.

Bruno Kahl, the head of Germany's foreign intelligence service, revealed that the Novichok agent identified from Navalny's toxicology results was a "harder" form than previously seen.

The research results from the Bundeswehr Institute of Pharmacology and Toxicology were handed over to the OPCW.

The Charité hospital, with Navalny's consent, published a scientific article titled "Novichok nerve agent poisoning" in the peer-reviewed medical journal The Lancet. In the article, 14 doctors described Navalny's clinical details and course of treatment. The doctors also confirmed that severe poisoning was the cause of Navalny's condition: "A laboratory of the German armed forces designated by the Organization for the Prohibition of Chemical Weapons identified an organophosphorus nerve agent from the Novichok group in blood samples collected immediately after the patient's admission to Charité." They also expressed the opinion that Navalny survived thanks to timely treatment and previous good health. After the publication, Navalny said that the evidence of the poisoning that Putin was demanding was now available to the whole world.

=== Technical assistance visit by the OPCW team ===
On 3 September 2020, the Organisation for the Prohibition of Chemical Weapons (OPCW) received from the German government a request of assistance according to the Chemical Weapons Convention. A team of inspectors visited the Charité Hospital, met Navalny, confirmed his identity, and directly supervised and monitored blood and urine sampling, which was conducted by the hospital staff in line with the OPCW procedure. The samples, which were maintained under OPCW chain of custody, were transferred to two certified laboratories designated by the OPCW Director General.

Researchers in the two OPCW designated laboratories, the laboratory in Bouchet, subordinate to the Direction générale de l'armement and Umeå, subordinate to the Swedish Defence Research Agency, confirmed Navalny's poisoning with a Novichok nerve agent. On 6 October 2020, the OPCW announced that results of testing samples obtained from Navalny had confirmed the presence of a Novichok nerve agent, saying:

... the biomarkers of the cholinesterase inhibitor found in Mr Navalny's blood and urine samples have similar structural characteristics as the toxic chemicals belonging to schedules 1.A.14 and 1.A.15 that were added to the Annex on Chemicals to the Convention during the Twenty-Fourth Session of the Conference of the States Parties in November 2019. This cholinesterase inhibitor is not listed in the Annex on Chemicals to the Convention.

The exact structure of the agent involved has not been publicly disclosed, but according to the announcement above, the compound shares structural similarities with A-232 (the example compound for schedule 1.A.14) and A-242 (the example compound for schedule 1.A.15). It was emphasized that any use of chemical weapons is "reprehensible and wholly contrary to the legal norms established by the international community." United Nations special rapporteur on Extrajudicial Executions Agnès Callamard and UN Special Rapporteur on the Promotion and Protection of the Right to Freedom of Opinion Irene Khan have confirmed that they intend to investigate Navalny's poisoning at his request.

=== Additional information available from semi-official or anonymous sources ===
According to Die Zeit and Der Spiegel, "a new and improved version of the Novichok agent, which has not been encountered in the world before", was used in Navalny's poisoning. This new type of Novichok is more toxic and dangerous than its previously known variants, but acts more slowly. It had been planned that Navalny would die on board the plane, but he had survived "thanks to a sequence of successful coincidences: the quick reaction of the pilot who made an emergency landing, and the doctors in Omsk, who immediately injected Navalny with atropine". German experts came to the conclusion that only Russian special services could have used such a "deadly and complex poison". To create a binary chemical weapon of this kind, a special laboratory is needed; it could not be synthesized by ordinary criminals. The German side rejected the version of Navalny's poisoning by foreign special services, as it would have been "unthinkable" in the conditions of constant surveillance of Navalny by the Russia's Federal Security Service (FSB): "All this allows us to draw only one plausible conclusion: it was the Kremlin who gave the order to get rid of unwanted criticism."

A source in the German special services told The New York Times that, according to German experts, Navalny was poisoned by Novichok in the form of a powder dissolved in a liquid, most likely in the tea he drank at the Russian airport. Given that the poison was also found on a bottle from Navalny's hotel room, The New York Times concluded that he could have been poisoned twice. Parliamentary Assembly of the Council of Europe has appointed Jacques Maire as special rapporteur on the poisoning of Navalny.

On 13 December 2020, an article from The Sunday Times, quoting anonymous intelligence sources, reported that Navalny had been poisoned a second time while in hospital in Omsk; the prior administration of the antidote atropine in response to the first poisoning is thought to have saved Navalny's life by counteracting the second dose of Novichok. Specialists found Novichok on the politician's underwear and clothes, including on his belt. The poison got on things after Russian intelligence agents entered Navalny's hotel room in Tomsk.

=== Bellingcat and The Insider joint investigation ===
On 14 December 2020, Bellingcat and The Insider, in co-operation with CNN, Der Spiegel and Anti-Corruption Foundation, published a joint investigation implicating agents from Russia's Federal Security Service (FSB) in Navalny's poisoning. The investigation detailed a special unit of the FSB specialising in chemical substances, and the investigators tracked members of the unit using telecom and travel data. The same day, Navalny published a new video and tweeted: "Case closed. I know who tried to kill me. The case concerning my murder attempt is solved. We know the names, we know the job ranks, and we have the photos." According to the investigation, Navalny had been under surveillance by a group of eight operatives from the unit since 2017, and there may have been earlier attempts to poison him. The travel data of the alleged FSB officers were made publicly available. When asked about the investigation, Putin called it "the legalisation of the materials of American intelligence agencies" and confirmed that Russian security agents were tailing Navalny, claiming that Navalny was backed by U.S. intelligence and denying that he was poisoned.

In January 2021, Bellingcat in a separate joint investigation with Der Spiegel linked the unit that tracked Navalny and allegedly poisoned him to the deaths of two other activists including Timur Kuashev in 2014 and Ruslan Magomedragimov in 2015, as well as potentially the politician Nikita Isayev in 2019, but it noted that Isayev was "absolutely loyal" to the Kremlin and there was no motive for him to have been killed by the FSB.

According to Bellingcat, the same FSB unit had been involved in the assassination of Boris Nemtsov and the poisonings of Vladimir Kara-Murza and Dmitry Bykov.

==== Telephone conversation with an FSB agent ====
External videos
- Call Between Alexey Navalny and FSB Officer Konstantin Kudryavtsev [English Subtitles] on YouTube (49 min 15 sec)
- Call Between Alexey Navalny and FSB Officer Konstantin Kudryavtsev on YouTube with Russian transcription and English subtitles

Following the investigation but before its publication, Navalny recorded his telephone conversation with Konstantin Borisovich Kudryavtsev, an FSB operative who was allegedly involved in his poisoning. The recording was released on 21 December 2020. During the phone conversation, Navalny posed as an aide to the secretary of Russia's Security Council Nikolai Patrushev, pretending to debrief Kudryavtsev about the operation and asking for details of why the mission had failed. Investigators used caller ID spoofing software to make the call look like it was coming from an FSB work phone number. Kudryavtsev unwittingly confessed that the Novichok agent had been applied to Navalny's underwear while he was staying at the hotel in Tomsk; but while Navalny had worn them for the flight as planned, the poison had apparently been absorbed too slowly. He attributed Navalny's survival to the pilots rerouting the flight and doctors in Omsk administering an antidote "almost immediately". Following Navalny's medical evacuation to Germany, the man said he had been sent to recover Navalny's clothes so that they could be treated to remove traces of Novichok before they could be tested by independent experts. The FSB later dismissed the recording of Navalny's telephone call as a forgery, calling it a "provocation" that "would not have been possible without the organizational and technical support of foreign special services". However, Bellingcat had arranged for its representatives to be present during the call, and they were; there are direct witnesses, in addition to the published audio and visual records of the call.

=== Russian state investigation ===
On 27 August 2020, Russian police and the Ministry of the Interior said they had launched a routine preliminary investigation into the poisoning, inspecting the hotel room and security footage. Russian police said that over 100 pieces of potential evidence had been collected. Prosecutors asserted that there was no need for any further investigation after the preliminary investigation, claiming it had found no sign that a crime had been committed.

=== Later developments ===
In January 2021, Navalny returned to Russia and was immediately detained on accusations of violating parole conditions while he was hospitalised in Germany. Following his arrest, mass protests were held across Russia. In February 2021, his suspended sentence was replaced with a prison sentence of over two and a half years' detention, and his organisations were later designated as extremist and liquidated. In March 2022, Navalny was sentenced to an additional nine years in prison after being found guilty of embezzlement and contempt of court in a new trial described as a sham by Amnesty International; his appeal was rejected and in June, he was transferred to a high-security prison. In August 2023, Navalny was sentenced to an additional 19 years in prison on extremism charges.

In December 2023, Navalny went missing from prison for almost three weeks. He re-emerged in an Arctic Circle corrective colony in the Yamalo-Nenets Autonomous Okrug. On 16 February 2024, the Russian prison service reported that Navalny had died at the age of 47.

== Opinions of doctors and scientists ==
=== Opinions of scientists who participated in the development of Novichok ===
==== Vladimir Uglev ====
One of the developers of substances like Novichok, Vladimir Uglev, said that he "trusts the German specialists 100%" and suggested that the poison was delivered using "a solution (for example, in dimethylformamide) of a solid analogue of A-234, namely, a solid A-242, which was applied on Navalny's underwear, plus the addition of some faster-acting substance that hides symptoms (for example, clonidine)." Uglyov suggested that Novichok had been applied on Navalny's underwear in a hotel room, and that the poison had entered his body a few hours before departure. According to the scientist, Navalny received about 20% of the lethal dose. Uglyov suggested that the organizers decided to poison Navalny with Novichok, since they mistakenly believed that this substance would be impossible to detect. Uglyov also expressed the opinion that the Russian laboratory could not detect Novichok in the biological samples acquired from Navalny because "German specialists had more modern equipment and instruments for determining such quantities, which were taken from Alexei's blood. And those who did the tests in Moscow had much weaker equipment and the tests showed the absence of the substance." After the release of an independent investigation by Navalny, in which it was assumed that Alexei and his wife Yulia could have been subjected to attempts at poisoning earlier, Uglyov did not rule out that Navalny could have encountered Novichok three times, in previous cases receiving small doses insufficient for a lethal outcome.

==== Vil Mirzayanov ====
Chemical weapons specialist Vil Mirzayanov, who worked at GosNIIOKhT and in the 1990s revealed the Novichok development program in the USSR and Russia, agreed with the conclusions of the Bundeswehr special laboratory and suggested that the latest versions of Novichok were used to poison Navalny: the compounds A-242 or A-262. Mirzayanov also stated that the symptoms described by Navalny on 19 September were comparable to those he was aware of for similar cases.

==== Leonid Rink ====
One of the developers of the Novichok agent, Leonid Rink, stated that if Novichok had been used to poison Navalny, he "would have been dead, not left in coma" and suggested that what happened to Navalny was an attack of acute pancreatitis. This position was later dismissed as "nonsense" by doctor Yaroslav Ashikhmin who treated Navalny, as no increase in pancreatic enzymes was found in Navalny's blood. Another fact-checker pointed out at least three cases of people poisoned with Novichok who survived (Andrei Zheleznyakov, Sergei and Yulia Skripal) whose symptoms were very consistent with those of Navalny. Rink also theorized that Navalny had poisoned himself in a "big theater play" or that the Germans had copied Novichok and then poisoned Navalny in Germany, without providing any evidence for those theories. Rink had also previously (in 2018) echoed a theory floated in Russian state media that the British could have been behind the poisoning of Sergei Skripal. He had also in 1995 confessed to selling Novichok to a criminal gang for $1500 but was never convicted.

=== Opinions of other doctors and scientists ===
Reanimatologist (anesthesiologist) Boris Teplykh, one of the participants in the council of Russian doctors who treated Navalny in the first days after the poisoning, said in an interview with Meduza that the Russian specialists from the Moscow Medical Center of Forensic Medicine were looking for organophosphates and traces of cholinesterase inhibitors, but did not find any. Teplykh explained the difference in the test results of Russian and German specialists by the fact that "we worked with forensic toxicologists, and they [Germans] worked with superchemists who deal with chemical warfare agents. Slightly different things."

Navalny's attending physician Anastasia Vasilyeva stated on the TV channel RTVI that all Navalny's symptoms clearly indicated organophosphate poisoning. The fact that she, as the attending physician, was not allowed to examine Alexei, nor access consultations and medical documentation for two days, in her opinion, indicated that they had tried to hide the symptoms of poisoning from her, on the basis of which she concluded that the Omsk doctors were given instructions to be silent.

Andy Smith, Professor of the Department of Toxicology at the University of Leicester, noted that it would be difficult to identify a specific toxic substance in Navalny's body after a few days, though not impossible, given recent advances in analytical chemistry. He also noted that although Navalny, with the help of atropine and other drugs, had survived the acute stage of the poisoning, inhibition of cholinesterase could lead to the appearance of neurodegenerative and neuropsychiatric diseases. In his opinion, this was exactly what the poisoners were counting on.

The head of the Institute of Toxicology in Munich, Professor Martin Goettlicher, in an interview with Deutsche Welle, noted that Navalny's symptomatology was in many ways similar to that of the poisoning of Sergei and Yulia Skripal. For example, in both cases, patients were put into an artificial coma for about three weeks to restore cholinesterase. Goettlicher also explained that when Navalny was poisoned, those around him did not necessarily have to suffer, as was the case with the Skripals, since the Novichok can be an oily liquid that evaporates or spreads poorly, depending on how the substance got into the body and in what quantity.

German biochemist Dr. Marc-Michael Blum, who previously headed the OPCW laboratory, as well as the team investigating the poisoning of Sergei and Yulia Skripal, confirmed that when Navalny was poisoned by Novichok, those around him could not have suffered: according to Blum, this indicated either that the level of exposure to the substance or the degree of its ingress into Navalny's body was too low, or that no one around had come into contact with the epicenter of the poison. Blum praised the work of the laboratory of the Institute of Pharmacology and Toxicology of the Bundeswehr, which was the first to confirm the poisoning of Navalny by Novichok (Blum had worked there in 2006–2010). Blum categorically denied that the OPCW laboratories could have engaged in conspiracies and falsified the results of chemical analysis by anyone's political will. After the OPCW published its own report, Blum stated: "five laboratories ... certified by the OPCW ... did the same tests and came to the same result," that "Navalny was poisoned with a chemical agent." Blum confirmed that "use of chemical weapons" and "violation of the Chemical Weapons Convention" is not determined by the presence of a substance on the List of Schedule 1 substances (CWC): "in the end, there is no need for the substance to be on the list — the point is how it will be used."

Boris Zhuikov, Doctor of Chemistry and Head of the Laboratory of the Institute for Nuclear Research of the Russian Academy of Sciences, explained that although Novichok can break down in the body relatively quickly (for example, in a couple of days), when decomposed, it leaves behind specific compounds containing fragments of Novichok molecules, with which it is possible not only to confirm a poisoning by Novichok, but also to establish which substance from this group was used. The Russian team stated that it did not find Novichok itself in its analyses of Navalny's samples, while the German laboratory found traces of Novichok's presence. Zhuikov explained that these statements do not necessarily contradict each other: "the substance itself is really no longer there, but the interaction products remained." Modern methods of analysis (primarily mass spectrometry in combination with chromatography) make it possible to detect such chemical byproducts with very high sensitivity (for example, easily detecting the presence of 1 mg of poison in a human body weighing 70 kg), and the detection of these byproducts can unambiguously identify the original poisonous substance. The German laboratory of the Bundeswehr, which analyzed Navalny's samples, had such equipment.

A group of six leading Western experts in the field of toxicology and chemical weapons, in an interview with the BBC Russian Service, commented that prompt medical assistance saved Navalny's life: he was given the antidote atropine (perhaps preventively) and breathing support. Scientists explained that there were no other victims of Navalny's poisoning since only Navalny received a high dose of the poisonous substance and was in prolonged contact with it. Experts also said that it is impossible to find the components necessary for the manufacture of Novichok on the market (some components themselves fall under the ban under the Chemical Weapons Convention), and only military laboratories can produce such poisons, since this requires special equipment and special security conditions.

In November 2021, a statement was published by 55 states parties to the OPCW that condemned the use of a "toxic chemical as a weapon" against Navalny, confirmed presence of cholinease inhibitors consistent with the "Novichok" series and urged Russia to provide answers to OPCW questions, to which Russia has failed to do since 2020.

== Reactions ==
The news of Navalny's poisoning caused the ruble to fall against the dollar and the euro.

On 20 August, UN spokesman Stéphane Dujarric expressed concern about Navalny's "sudden illness". U.S. President Donald Trump said the U.S. was monitoring reports on the leader of the Russian opposition. U.S. National Security Advisor Robert O'Brien said that reports of the possible poisoning of Navalny were causing "extreme concern" in Washington.

On 21 August, the Office of the United Nations High Commissioner for Human Rights said it expected Navalny to receive proper medical attention. The German government announced that there were serious grounds to suspect that poisoning had taken place, and called for Navalny to be provided with any medical assistance that could save him. Head of the European Council Charles Michel expressed concern about the state of Navalny. French President Emmanuel Macron stated that France was ready to offer "all necessary assistance ... in terms of health care, asylum, protection" to Navalny and his family and demanded clarity on the circumstances surrounding the incident. German Chancellor Angela Merkel also offered any medical assistance necessary in German hospitals. Amnesty International called for an investigation into the alleged poisoning. According to John Sipher, a former CIA station chief in Moscow, "Whether or not Putin personally ordered the poisoning, he is behind any and all efforts to maintain control through intimidation and murder".

On 24 August, German Chancellor Angela Merkel and Foreign Minister Heiko Maas in a joint statement called on the Russian authorities to clarify in detail and as transparently as possible the entirety of circumstances surrounding the incident, and to identify and prosecute those responsible. The head of EU diplomacy, Josep Borrell, said that the Russian authorities should immediately begin an independent and transparent investigation into the poisoning of Navalny.

On 25 August, French Foreign Minister Jean-Yves Le Drian said that France, on the basis of the preliminary conclusion of the Charité clinic doctors about Navalny's poisoning, considered the incident a criminal act and called for finding and punishing those responsible.

U.S. Deputy Secretary of State Stephen Biegun expressed deep concern about Navalny's condition, as well as the impact of reports of his poisoning on civil society in Russia. The American diplomat also stressed the importance of transparency and freedom of speech in any democratic state. Biegun said that "if Navalny's poisoning is confirmed, the U.S. could take steps that would exceed Washington's response to findings of Russian meddling in the 2016 U.S. presidential election."

On 25 August, businessman Yevgeny Prigozhin, who had ties to Putin and had been nicknamed "Putin's chef", was quoted as saying that he intended to enforce a court decision the previous year that required Navalny, his associate Lyubov Sobol and his Anti-Corruption Foundation to pay 88 million rubles in damages to the Moskovsky Shkolnik company over a video investigation. Prigozhin had bought the debt so that Navalny and his associate would owe him directly. Prigozhin was quoted by the company as saying "I intend to strip this group of unscrupulous people of their clothes and shoes" and that if Navalny survived, Navalny would be liable "according to the full severity of Russian law".

On 26 August, British Prime Minister Boris Johnson and NATO Secretary General Jens Stoltenberg joined in demanding a transparent investigation. According to Johnson, Navalny's poisoning "shocked the world," and Stoltenberg saw no reason to question the conclusions of the Charité doctors.

On 2 September, after the German government officially announced that the pharmaceutical and toxicology laboratory of the Bundeswehr found traces of poison from the Novichok group in Alexey Navalny's body, German Chancellor Angela Merkel issued a statement in which she called Navalny's poisoning an attempt to silence him: "Someone tried to silence [Mr Navalny] and in the name of the whole German government I condemn that in the strongest terms." Merkel said that "Mr. Navalny ha[d] been the victim of a crime" which "raise[d] very serious questions that only the Russian government c[ould] and must answer". The European External Action Service in a statement condemned the poisoning and said that it is "essential that the Russian government investigates thoroughly and in a transparent manner the assassination attempt of Mr Navalny". Boris Johnson demanded that Russia provide an explanation and said that he considered it "outrageous that a chemical weapon was used against Alexey Navalny." He promised to "work with international partners to ensure justice is done." Jean-Yves Le Drian condemned the "shocking and irresponsible" use of a Novichok poisoning agent and said it was in violation of the ban on the use of chemical weapons. The Italian Foreign Ministry "condemned with force" the poisoning of Navalny, called this act a "crime", and, expressing "profound concern and indignation", demanded an explanation from Russia.

Stephen Biegun stated that the U.S. finds the German conclusion about the use of Novichok "very credible" and "deeply concerning". Navalny's chief of staff, Leonid Volkov, stated "In 2020, poisoning Navalny with Novichok is the same as leaving an autograph at the scene of the crime".

On 3 September, the European Council called the incident an "assassination attempt". After the German government concluded that Navalny was poisoned by Novichok, the wife of British policeman Nick Bailey, who was exposed to Novichok after the poisoning of Sergei and Yulia Skripal, tweeted, "It's been almost 2 1/2 years after the events in Salisbury and there has been no justice for Dawn and her family and none for the Skripals, Charlie or us. And now it's happened again".

On 4 September, Jens Stoltenberg stated: "Time and again, we have seen opposition leaders and critics of the Russian regime attacked, and their lives threatened. Some have even been killed. So this is not just an attack on an individual, but on fundamental democratic rights. It is a serious breach of international law, which demands an international response." He also asked the Russian authorities to fully cooperate with an impartial international investigation.

On 5 September, Donald Trump announced that the United States should soon receive documents from Germany on the Navalny case, which will allow Washington to determine its position. He noted that he had no reason to question Germany's conclusions that Navalny was poisoned by Novichok, and stressed that if the fact of the poisoning was confirmed, it would anger him.

On 6 September, Heiko Maas said that Germany was planning to discuss possible sanctions against Russia if the Kremlin does not provide an explanation soon, saying that any sanctions should be "targeted". Maas also said that there were "several indications" that Russian authorities were behind the poisoning. He also said that a lack of support from Russia in the investigation could "force" Germany to change its position on the Nord Stream 2 gas pipeline from Russia to Germany.

On 8 September, UN High Commissioner for Human Rights Michelle Bachelet called on Russia "to carry out, or fully cooperate with, a thorough, transparent, independent and impartial investigation, after German specialists said they have "unequivocal proof" that he was poisoned with a Novichok nerve agent."

In a March 2021 report, the East StratCom Task Force of the European External Action Service registered an increase in false information propagated in Russia about Germany as a result of the deterioration in German-Russian relations developed since the poison attack. In 2020 The Task Force reported over 300 cases of false information targeting Alexei Navalny, while most of the cases have appeared after the poisoning.

=== Comments by political scientists and sociologists ===
Political scientist Nikolai Petrov, senior fellow at the Royal Institute of International Affairs (Chatham House) and professor of political science at the Higher School of Economics, commenting on the poisoning of Navalny for The New York Times, noted that in the Kremlin "no one else causes such hostility and fear as Navalny". This means that "there is a very long list of potential enemies" who may wish for Navalny's death, or at least want to render him incapacitated. However, Navalny is such a prominent figure in Russia that none of his personal enemies would have dared to take such radical measures against him without, "at least, the tacit consent of Putin." According to Petrov, in Russia there is a system "like in the mafia: nothing can be done without the approval and guarantees of immunity from the boss. I'm not saying that Putin directly ordered the poisoning of him, but no one can act without making sure the boss is happy and punishes them."

The opinion that Putin personally was involved in the poisoning of Navalny was also expressed by the doctor of historical sciences, political scientist Valery Solovei. In his opinion, such operations cannot be carried out without Putin knowing about them, who at least was aware of the poisoning plans. Solovei also believes that after returning to Russia, they will continue to exert financial pressure on Navalny and will try to "hit all his connections, all with whom he cooperates and interacts."

Mark Galeotti, an expert on Russian special services and professor emeritus at University College London, noted in an interview with Deutsche Welle that the use of Novichok is proof that either the state or "someone with a high degree of power and authority in the state" was involved in the attempt to poison Navalny. According to Galeotti, if the measures taken by the West in response to this poisoning are not effective, then Moscow will continue to carry out such operations.

Former German ambassador to Russia and former vice-president of the Federal Intelligence Service of Germany Rüdiger von Fritsch, commenting on the inaction of the Russian Federation in the investigation of Navalny's poisoning, said: "For more than three weeks now we have been in a situation where Russia does not help in any way in the investigation, but only puts forward accusations in reply ... The one who stole himself then shouts very loudly, pointing in the other direction. We are faced with this for the umpteenth time. The scenario is the same: reprimands, shifting the burden of gathering evidence to others, threats, ridicule. The most important thing is not to conduct an investigation, never".

Professor of Rutgers University, sociologist Sergei Erofeev said that a group of professors from a number of recognized universities nominated Navalny for the Nobel Peace Prize as having made a significant contribution to the fight for human rights. Erofeev noted that although the very idea of such a nomination is not new, it acquired particular relevance in connection with the poisoning of Navalny.

Retired FSB General Evgeniy Savostyanov said that the poisoning of Navalny is "an act of state terrorism", in which "the president and his special services" were involved.

Researcher of the Russian armed forces and special services Mark Galeotti, commenting on the telephone conversation between Navalny and the FSB agent, said that Navalny was able to "demonstrate how much top-secret information is available on the darknet — phone numbers, names, everything else. And that all this can be used to identify individuals. And what's more, getting them to talk about their work."

=== Polls ===
According to polls conducted by the Levada Center in December 2020, 78% of Russian respondents had heard about Navalny's poisoning. 30% of the respondents believed there was no poisoning at all and that it is a mock-up, 19% opted for a provocation of Western special services, 15% opted for an attempt by the authorities to eliminate the political opponent. 7% of respondents see a personal revenge on one of the people involved in Navalny's investigations, 6% a struggle within the Russian opposition, and 1% believe in health problems, accidental poisoning, or common poisoning. 4% think other reasons are more likely, and 19% find the question hard to answer. There was a significant correlation between the belief in poisoning by the authorities and age, sources of information, and attitude towards the government in general.

=== Film ===
Navalny, a 2022 documentary directed by Daniel Roher was released recounting the days leading up to, during, and after the assassination attempt.

On the review aggregator website Rotten Tomatoes, 99% of 97 critics' reviews are positive, with an average rating of 8.4/10. The website's consensus reads, "Navalny is a documentary that's as gripping as any thriller – but the real-life fight against authoritarianism that it details is deadly serious." Metacritic, which uses a weighted average, assigned the film a score of 82 out of 100, based on 22 critics, indicating "universal acclaim".

The Guardian critic Phil Harrison awarded it 5/5 stars calling it "... one of the most jaw-dropping things you'll ever witness", and "this terrifying documentary enters the realms of the far-fetched spy thriller – and yet it's all true". New York Times film critic Ben Kenigsberg added the film to the "Critic's List" and also praised it saying "Roher has assembled a tense and absorbing look at Navalny and his inner circle".

== See also ==
- Pyotr Verzilov
- Assassination of Anna Politkovskaya
- Assassination of Boris Nemtsov
- Poisoning of Alexander Litvinenko
- Poisoning of Sergei and Yulia Skripal
- Vladimir Vladimirovich Kara-Murza
- Viktor Yushchenko
- Death of Alexei Navalny
