= A-262 =

Names
- IUPAC name 1,1,3,3-tetraethyl-2-[fluoro(methoxy)phosphoryl]guanidine

Identifiers
CAS Number	2422944-38-3
3D model (JSmol)	Interactive image
ChemSpider	129432163
PubChem CID	149628685
UNII	MCL38N4DHF
CompTox Dashboard (EPA)	DTXSID801336561
- InChI: InChI=1S/C10H23FN3O2P/c1-6-13(7-2)10(14(8-3)9-4)12-17(11,15)16-5/h6-9H2,1-5H3 Key: AEQJLRXTEIZQBQ-UHFFFAOYSA-N
- SMILES: CCN(CC)C(=NP(=O)(OC)F)N(CC)CC

Properties
Chemical formula	C_{10}H_{23}FN_{3}O_{2}P
Molar mass	267.285 g·mol^{−1}
- Except where otherwise noted, data are given for materials in their standard state (at 25 °C [77 °F], 100 kPa). Infobox references

A-262 is an organophosphate nerve agent. It was developed in the Soviet Union under the FOLIANT program and is one of the group of compounds referred to as Novichok agents that were revealed by Vil Mirzayanov. Mirzayanov gives little specific information about A-262, stating that it is highly toxic, but no figures are given to compare it to other related agents. It is reportedly a solid rather than a volatile liquid as with most nerve agents, and in order to weaponise it successfully, it had to be milled into a fine powder form that could be dispersed as a dust.

== Legal status ==
A-262 is not specifically listed in the Annex on Chemicals of the Chemical Weapons Convention, and falls outside the general definitions covering other Novichok agents, even though it has a chemical structure similar to that of both A-232 (the example compound for schedule 1.A.14) and A-242 (the example compound for schedule 1.A.15). It would however be considered a "Toxic Chemical" under the catch-all provisions due to its potent acetylcholinesterase inhibitor activity and potential military applications, but the level of control it is subject to is lower than that for compounds specifically listed under Schedule 1.

== See also ==
- C01-A035
- C01-A039
- A-230
- A-232
- A-234
- A-242
