= A-230 =

- Chemical structure of A-230 as described by Mirzayanov

Names
- IUPAC name methyl-(1-(diethylamino)ethylidene)phosphonamidofluoridate

Identifiers
CAS Number	2387496-12-8
3D model (JSmol)	Interactive image
ChEBI	CHEBI:140423
ChemSpider	64808785
PubChem CID	132472359
CompTox Dashboard (EPA)	DTXSID90896939
- InChI: InChI=1/C7H16FN2OP/c1-5-10(6-2)7(3)9-12(4,8)11/h5-6H2,1-4H3 Key: OUJDIWHRYQBZSR-UHFFFAOYNA-N
- SMILES: CCN(CC)C(C)=N[P](C)(F)=O

Properties
Chemical formula	C_{7}H_{16}FN_{2}OP
Molar mass	194.190 g·mol^{−1}
- Except where otherwise noted, data are given for materials in their standard state (at 25 °C [77 °F], 100 kPa). Infobox references

A-230 is an organophosphate nerve agent. It was developed in the Soviet Union under the FOLIANT program and is one of the group of compounds referred to as Novichok agents that were revealed by Vil Mirzayanov. A-230 is possibly the most potent nerve agent for which specific toxicity figures have been published, with a human lethal dose estimated to be less than 0.1 mg. However it was felt to be less suitable for weaponisation than other agents such as A-232 and A-234, due to issues with the liquid agent exhibiting low volatility and solidifying at low temperatures, as well as poor stability in the presence of water.

== Legal status ==
A-230 has been added to Schedule 1 of the Annex on Chemicals of the Chemical Weapons Convention as of June 2020, and it has been explicitly named as an example compound for schedule 1.A.13. For chemicals listed in Schedule 1, the most stringent declaration and verification measures are in place combined with far-reaching limits and bans on production and use. It is notable to say that Annex 1 does not explicitly relate this structure to the name A-230, just add this particular structure to the prohibited compounds section.

== See also ==
- C01-A035
- C01-A039
- A-242
- EA-3148
- EA-3990
- Methylfluorophosphonylcholine
- VR
- VP
