= A-242 =

Names
- IUPAC name methyl-(bis(diethylamino)methylene)phosphonamidofluoridate
- Systematic IUPAC name 1,1,3,3-tetraethyl-2-[fluoro(methyl)phosphoryl]guanidine

Identifiers
CAS Number	2387496-14-0
3D model (JSmol)	Interactive image
ChemSpider	129558776
PubChem CID	146586254
UNII	S4WK8V638W
CompTox Dashboard (EPA)	DTXSID401036886
- InChI: InChI=1S/C10H23FN3OP/c1-6-13(7-2)10(12-16(5,11)15)14(8-3)9-4/h6-9H2,1-5H3 Key: WJDIQLITBJEMBA-UHFFFAOYSA-N
- SMILES: CCN(CC)C(=N[P](C)(F)=O)N(CC)CC

Properties
Chemical formula	C_{10}H_{23}FN_{3}OP
Molar mass	251.286 g·mol^{−1}
- Except where otherwise noted, data are given for materials in their standard state (at 25 °C [77 °F], 100 kPa). Infobox references

A-242 is an organophosphate nerve agent. It was developed in the Soviet Union under the FOLIANT program and is one of the group of compounds referred to as Novichok agents that were revealed by Vil Mirzayanov. Mirzayanov gives little specific information about A-242, stating that it is highly toxic but no figures are given to compare it to other related agents. It is reportedly a solid rather than a volatile liquid as with most nerve agents, and in order to weaponise it successfully, it had to be milled into a fine powder form that could be dispersed as a dust.

== Legal status ==
A-242 has been added to Schedule 1 of the Annex on Chemicals of the Chemical Weapons Convention as of June 2020, and it has been explicitly named as an example compound for schedule 1.A.15. For chemicals listed in Schedule 1, the most stringent declaration and verification measures are in place combined with far-reaching limits and bans on production and use.

== See also ==
- C01-A035
- C01-A039
- A-230
- A-232
- A-234
- A-262
