= A-232 =

Names
- IUPAC name methoxy-(1-(diethylamino)ethylidene)phosphoramidofluoridate

Identifiers
| CAS Number | 2387496-04-8 |
| 3D model (JSmol) | Interactive image |
| ChEBI | CHEBI:140424 |
| ChemSpider | 64808786 |
| PubChem CID | 132472360 |
| CompTox Dashboard (EPA) | DTXSID401020099 |
- InChI: InChI=1/C7H16FN2O2P/c1-5-10(6-2)7(3)9-13(8,11)12-4/h5-6H2,1-4H3/b9-7+ Key: BBTXAVJVSQSXHZ-VQHVLOKHNA-N
- SMILES: CCN(CC)C(\C)=N\P(F)(=O)OC

Properties
| Chemical formula | C_{7}H_{16}FN_{2}O_{2}P |
| Molar mass | 210.189 g·mol^{−1} |
- Except where otherwise noted, data are given for materials in their standard state (at 25 °C [77 °F], 100 kPa). Infobox references

A-232 is an organophosphate nerve agent. It was developed in the Soviet Union under the FOLIANT program and is one of the group of compounds referred to as Novichok agents that were revealed by Vil Mirzayanov. A-232 is reportedly slightly less potent as a nerve agent compared to some of the other compounds in the series such as A-230 and A-234, having similar potency to the older nerve agent VR. However it proved to be the most versatile agent as it was chemically stable and remained a volatile liquid over a wide temperature range, making it able to be used in standard chemical munitions without requiring special delivery mechanisms to be developed.

== Legal status ==
A-232 has been added to Schedule 1 of the Annex on Chemicals of the Chemical Weapons Convention as of June 2020, and is identified (by its IUPAC name) as a specific example for the group of compounds circumscribed at 1.A.14 in the schedule. For chemicals listed in Schedule 1, the most stringent declaration and verification measures are in place combined with far-reaching limits and bans on production and use.

== See also ==
- C01-A035
- C01-A039
- A-242
- EA-3148
