= C01-A042 =

Names
- IUPAC name N-[(Ethoxyfluorophosphinyl)oxy]-2,2-difluoro-2-nitroethanimidoyl fluoride

Identifiers
CAS Number	17642-30-7
3D model (JSmol)	Interactive image
ChemSpider	95564827
PubChem CID	154735207
CompTox Dashboard (EPA)	DTXSID701020098
- InChI: InChI=1S/C4H5F4N2O5P/c1-2-14-16(8,13)15-9-3(5)4(6,7)10(11)12/h2H2,1H3/b9-3- Key: WQEHDIIEGLMDOX-OQFOIZHKSA-N
- SMILES: CCOP(=O)(O/N=C(/C([N+](=O)[O-])(F)F)\F)F

Properties
Chemical formula	C_{4}H_{5}F_{4}N_{2}O_{5}P
Molar mass	268.060 g·mol^{−1}
Density	1.506 g/mL
Boiling point	81 °C; 178 °F; 354 K (5 mmHg)
- Except where otherwise noted, data are given for materials in their standard state (at 25 °C [77 °F], 100 kPa). Infobox references

C01-A042 is a Novichok agent.

== See also ==
- Novichok agent
- C01-A035
- C01-A039
