= Timur Kuashev =

Kabardino-Balkarian human rights activist

- Тимур Куашев
- Born: c. 1988; North Caucasus
- Disappeared: July 31, 2014
- Status: Found dead
- Died: August 1, 2014 (aged 26); Nalchik, Kabardino-Balkar Republic, Russia
- Occupation: Journalist
- Employer: Dosh (Dosch) magazine
- Known for: Journalism/blogger and human rights activism
- Website: http://timur-kuashev.livejournal.com/

Timur Khambiyevich Kuashev (Russian: Тимур Хамбиевич Куашев; c. 1988 – August 1, 2014) was a Kabardino-Balkarian human rights activist. He had connections to Moscow-based rights organization Memorial and was a freelance journalist for the magazine Dosh (or Dosch). In 2014, Kuashev was found dead 15 kilometers from his home in Nalchik, Kabardino-Balkar Republic within the North Caucasus, Russia. His death was viewed as suspicious, and as of 2017, the investigation is still not closed.

== Career ==
Kuashev was a Russian journalist and human rights activist. He was aligned with the Moscow-based rights organization Memorial. He was employed by a magazine by the name of Dosh (or Dosch). He had written for other publications, including Kavkazsky Uzel and Kavkazskaya Politika. Outside of his career at Dosh, he was also a blogger on the popular site LiveJournal, in which he criticized local law enforcement and regional policies.

== Death ==
Timur Kuashev was killed in Nalchik, Kabardino-Balkaria Republic, shown here relative to the Russian capital Moscow.

Before he disappeared and was found dead, Kuashev had received threats from police after being detained in May to curtail his attending the funeral procession held on the 150th anniversary of the ending of the Caucasian War. He told others, "Employees of the Ministry of Internal Affairs (MIA) of the Kabardino-Balkarian Republic (KBR) had informed some national leaders that I was going to organize a provocation at the march on May 21, namely, to come there with Islamic banners. I declare that it's an absolute lie." The Kavkazsky Uzel, an independent regional website, reported that the police who detained Kuashev threatened him in response to his blog posts which criticizing law enforcement. Kavkazsky Uzel reported that police told Kuashev, "Continue on this path and this will bite you in the ass."

The disappearance of Kuashev occurred on the evening of July 31, after he had left his apartment to go on a jog. On the evening of the following day, August 1, 2014, his deceased body was found in the outskirts of Nalchik, a suburb of Khasania, 15 kilometers from his apartment in a wooded area.

An injection wound was found in the left armpit following autopsy. The cause of his death was revealed to be acute coronary insufficiency, but ultimately unknown and under continued investigation and appeals. Despite early indications of poisoning, there was no data suggesting it a possible cause.

A trace of an injected substance was found in his blood stream along with a visible injection marking following the autopsy report days after his death. This differs from previous deaths recorded of journalists as most other journalists were killed from gunshot wounds. After finding the injected substance, Valery Ustov, the head of the Investigative Management IC Russia for the Kabardino-Balkaria (KBR), said there would be further investigation and described this type of suspected murder for a journalist as unique in Russia.

According to research by Spiegel, Bellingcat and The Insider, Konstantin Kudryavtsev, who was involved in the Poisoning of Alexei Navalny, traveled to Nalchik on July 13, 2014. Ivan Osipov and Alexey Alexandrov, who, according to research, were also involved in the poison attack on Alexei Navalny, flew to the region on July 22 and July 29, 2014. In the days after Kuashevs death, Osipov and Alexey Alexandrov flew back to Moscow. The same members of the FSB group were involved in deaths of public figure Ruslan Magomedragimov on March 24, 2015, in the town of Kaspiysk in Dagestan and leader of "New Russia" movement Nikita Isaev on November 16, 2019, on the Tambov-Moscow train.

== Context ==
As of 2015, Russia has been ranked 180 out of 199 countries in terms of press freedom. Under Vladimir Putin, Russia's ranking for press freedom has steadily declined in the past decade. These rankings come after numerous rumors of Putin's history with journalists that do not agree with him and the possibility of him having them killed. Rumors stem from the death of 34 journalists since 2000, the year Putin was elected into office. For comparison, 2 journalists have died in China and 3 journalists deaths within the United States within the same time period.

== Impact ==
After the death of Kuashev, the North Caucasus added him to one of the ten unsolved deaths in journalists since 2000. In the area of Nalchik and the North Caucasus republic of Kabardino-Balkariya, journalists and human rights activists are known to be killed consistently and with impunity.

Kuashev was reported by Reporters Without Borders to be the only journalist to be killed in Russia in 2014.

== Reactions ==
Within days before his death, colleagues believed that Kuashev was under constant surveillance strictly pertaining to his undercover professional activities. Dosh editor Abdulla Duduev released a statement on his death saying, "We are absolutely sure that Kuashev's death is directly related to his professional activities."

Irina Bokova, director-general of UNESCO, said, “It is important for press freedom and for journalists to be able to carry out their professional duties without fearing for their lives. I trust that the authorities will spare no efforts in shedding light into the circumstances of the death of Timur Kuashev.”

Reporters Without Borders released a statement which said, "Timur always wrote effectively, honestly and courageously... at our request on the most current topics – politics, illegal actions by the security forces and special operations."

Days after his investigation, Dunja Mijatovic, a representative from the Organization for Security and Co-operation in Europe and Media of Freedom, issued a statement saying, “I express my condolences to Kuashev’s family and colleagues, and hope the authorities will conduct a thorough investigation into the circumstances of his death."

Six months after the death of Timur Kuashev, a petition was created and filled with close to 500 signatures insisting the Russian government, Investigating Committee of the Russian Federation and the Public Human Rights Centre of the Kabardino-Balkarian Republic to push for faster judicial inquiry to come to conclusion for the cause of death and to discover the perpetrators who may have caused his death. Valery Khatazhukov, the current head of Public Human Rights Centre of the Kabardino-Balkarian Republic, signed the document and sent it to different investigative parties.

== See also ==
- List of journalists killed in Russia
- Media portrayal of the Russo-Ukrainian War
