= Novichok =

Series of nerve agents developed by the Soviet Union

Novichok (Russian: Новичо́к, lit. 'newcomer, novice, newbie') is a family of nerve agents, some of which are binary chemical weapons. The agents were developed at the GosNIIOKhT state chemical research institute by the Soviet Union and Russia between 1971 and 1993. (Note: Jonathon B. Tucker writes that approval to commence research into "fourth generation" chemical weapons was given by the Central Committee of the Communist Party and the Soviet Council of Ministers in May 1971. Vil Mirzayanov, the Russian scientist who first alerted the West to the existence of the Novichok agents, states that testing of Novichok-7 was successfully completed in 1993—after the signing of the Chemical Weapons Convention but before Russia ratified the treaty and when it came into force.) Some Novichok agents are solids at standard temperature and pressure, while others are liquids. Dispersal of solid form agents is thought possible if in ultrafine powder state.

Russian scientists who developed the nerve agents claim they are the deadliest ever made, with some variants possibly five to eight times more potent than VX, and others up to ten times more potent than soman. Iran has also been associated with the production of such chemical agents.

In the twenty-first century, Novichok agents came to public attention after they were used to poison opponents of the Russian government, including in the attempted assassination of Sergei Skripal in the United Kingdom which resulted in the poisonings of 5 people and the death of an unrelated civilian in Amesbury (2018), as well as the poisoning of Alexei Navalny (2020). However, the use of Novichok domestically against Russian citizens has been known since at least 1995.

In November 2019, the Organisation for the Prohibition of Chemical Weapons (OPCW), which is the executive body for the Chemical Weapons Convention (CWC), added the Novichok agents to "list of controlled substances" of the CWC "in one of the first major changes to the treaty since it was agreed in the 1990s" in response to the 2018 poisonings in the UK.

== Design objectives ==
Novichok agents were designed to achieve four objectives:

- to be undetectable using standard 1970s and 1980s NATO chemical detection equipment;
- to defeat NATO chemical protective gear;
- to be safer to handle; and
- to circumvent the Chemical Weapons Convention list of controlled precursors, classes of chemical and physical form.

Some of these agents are binary weapons, in which precursors for the nerve agents are mixed in a munition to produce the agent just prior to its use. The precursors are generally significantly less hazardous than the agents themselves, so this technique makes handling and transporting the munitions a great deal simpler. Additionally, precursors to the agents are usually much easier to stabilise than the agents themselves, so this technique also makes it possible to increase the shelf life of the agents. This has the disadvantage that careless preparation may produce a non-optimal agent. During the 1980s and 1990s, binary versions of several Soviet agents were developed and are designated as "Novichok" agents.

== History and disclosure ==
Novichok agents were designed as part of a Soviet program codenamed Foliant. Five Novichok variants are believed to have been adapted for military use. The most versatile is A-232 (Novichok-5). Novichok agents have never been used on the battlefield. The UK government determined that a Novichok agent was used in the poisoning of Sergei and Yulia Skripal in Salisbury, Wiltshire, England in March 2018. This was unanimously confirmed by four laboratories around the world, according to the OPCW.

Novichok was also involved in the poisoning of a British couple in Amesbury, Wiltshire, four months later, believed to have been caused by residual nerve agent discarded after the Salisbury attack. The attacks led to the death of one person, left three others in a critical condition from which they recovered, and briefly hospitalised a police officer. The Russian government denies producing or researching agents "under the title Novichok". In September 2020, the German government said that opposition figure and anti-corruption activist Alexei Navalny, who was evacuated from Omsk to Berlin for treatment in late August after becoming ill during his flight, was poisoned by a Novichok agent.

Novichok has been known to most Western intelligence services since the 1990s, and in 2016 Iranian chemists working at a university in Tehran synthesised five of the seven Novichok agents for analysis and produced detailed mass spectroscopy data which was added to the OPCW's Central Analytical Database. Previously, there had been no detailed descriptions of their spectral properties in peer-reviewed general scientific literature. A small amount of agent A-230 was also claimed to have been synthesised in the Czech Republic in 2017 for the purpose of obtaining analytical data to help defend against these novel toxic compounds.

The Soviet Union and Russia reportedly developed extremely potent fourth-generation chemical weapons from the 1970s until the early 1990s, according to a publication by two chemists, Lev Fyodorov and Vil Mirzayanov, in Moskovskiye Novosti weekly in 1992. (Note: Mirzayanov had made a similar disclosure a year earlier in the 10 October 1991 issue of the Moscow newspaper Kuranty.) The publication appeared just on the eve of Russia's signing of the Chemical Weapons Convention. According to Mirzayanov, the Russian Military Chemical Complex (MCC) was using defence conversion money received from the West for development of a chemical warfare facility. Mirzayanov made his disclosure out of environmental concerns. He was the head of a counter-intelligence department and performed measurements outside the chemical weapons facilities to make sure that foreign spies could not detect any traces of production. To his horror, the levels of deadly substances were eighty times greater than the maximum safe concentration.

The Prosecutor-General of Russia effectively admitted the existence of Novichok agents when he brought a treason case against Mirzayanov. According to expert witness testimonies that three scientists prepared for the KGB, Novichok and other related chemical agents had indeed been produced and therefore Mirzayanov's disclosure represented high treason. (Note: "[T]he talk [by Mirzayanov] about binary weapons was no more than a verbal construct, an argument ex adverso, and only the MCC [Russian Military Chemical Complex] could corroborate or refute this natural assumption. By entangling V. S. Mirzayanov in the investigation, the MCC confirmed the stated hypothesis, advancing it to the ranks of proven facts.")

Mirzayanov was arrested on 22 October 1992 and sent to Lefortovo prison for divulging state secrets. He was released later because "not one of the formulas or names of poisonous substances in the Moscow News article was new to the Soviet press, nor were locations ... of testing sites revealed." According to Yevgenia Albats, "the real state secret revealed by Fyodorov and Mirzayanov was that generals had lied—and were still lying—to both the international community and their fellow citizens." Mirzayanov now lives in the U.S.

Further disclosures followed when Vladimir Uglev, one of Russia's leading binary weapons scientists, revealed the existence of A-232/Novichok-5 in an interview with the magazine Novoye Vremya in early 1994. In his 1998 interview with David E. Hoffman for The Washington Post the chemist claimed that he helped invent the A-232 agent, that it was more frostproof, and confirmed that a binary version has been developed from it. Uglev revealed more details in 2018, following the poisoning of the Skripals, stating that "several hundred" compounds were synthesised during the Foliant research but only four agents were weaponised (presumably the Novichok-5, −7, −8 and −9 mentioned by other sources): the first three were liquids and only the last, which was not developed until 1980, could be made into a powder. Unlike the interview twenty years earlier, he denied any binary agents were developed successfully, at least up until his involvement in the research ceased in 1994.

In the 1990s, the German Federal Intelligence Service (BND) obtained a sample of one Novichok agent from a Russian scientist, and the sample was analysed in Sweden, according to a 2018 Reuters report. The chemical formula was given to Western NATO countries, who synthesized it, then used small amounts to test protective equipment, detection of it, and antidotes to it.

Novichok was referred to in a patent filed in 2008 for an organophosphorus poisoning treatment. The University of Maryland, Baltimore research was funded in part by the U.S. Army.

Professor Leonid Rink, who said he had participated in the creation of Novichok agents, confirmed that the structures leaked by Mirzayanov were the correct ones. Rink was himself convicted in Russia for illegally selling a Novichok agent used in 1995 to assassinate a banker, Ivan Kivelidi, and his secretary.

David Wise, in his book Cassidy's Run, implies that the Soviet program may have been the unintended result of misleading information, involving a discontinued American program to develop a nerve agent code named "GJ", that was fed by a double agent to the Soviets as part of Operation Shocker.

== Development and test sites ==
Stephanie Fitzpatrick, an American geopolitical consultant, has claimed that the Chemical Research Institute in Nukus, Soviet Uzbekistan, produced Novichok agents, and The New York Times has reported that U.S. officials said the site was the major research and testing site for Novichok agents. Small, experimental batches of the weapons may have been tested on the nearby Ustyurt Plateau. Fitzpatrick also writes that the agents may have been tested in a research centre in Krasnoarmeysk near Moscow. Precursor chemicals were made at the Pavlodar Chemical Plant in Soviet Kazakhstan, which was also thought to be the intended Novichok weapons production site, until its still-under-construction chemical warfare agent production building was demolished in 1987 in view of the forthcoming 1990 Chemical Weapons Accord and the Chemical Weapons Convention.

Since its independence in 1991, Uzbekistan has been working with the government of the United States to dismantle and decontaminate the sites where the Novichok agents and other chemical weapons were tested and developed. Between 1999 and 2002 the United States Department of Defense dismantled the major research and testing site for Novichok at the Chemical Research Institute in Nukus, under a $6 million Cooperative Threat Reduction program.

Hamish de Bretton-Gordon, a British chemical weapons expert and former commanding officer of the UK's Joint Chemical, Biological, Radiation and Nuclear Regiment and its NATO equivalent, "dismissed" suggestions that Novichok agents could be found in other places in the former Soviet Union such as Uzbekistan and has asserted that Novichok agents were produced only at Shikhany in Saratov Oblast, Russia. Mirzayanov also says that it was at Shikhany, in 1973, that scientist Pyotr Petrovich Kirpichev first produced Novichok agents; Vladimir Uglev joined him on the project in 1975. According to Mirzayanov, while production took place in Shikhany, the weapon was tested at Nukus between 1986 and 1989.

Following the poisoning of the Skripals, former head of the GosNIIOKhT security department Nikolay Volodin confirmed in an interview to Novaya Gazeta that there have been tests at Nukus, and said that dogs were used.

In May 2018, the Irish Independent reported that "Germany's foreign intelligence service secured a sample of the Soviet-developed nerve agent Novichok in the 1990s and passed on its knowledge to partners including Britain and the US, according to German media reports." The sample was analysed in Sweden. Small amounts of the Novichok nerve agent were subsequently produced in some NATO countries for test purposes.

== Description of Novichok agents ==
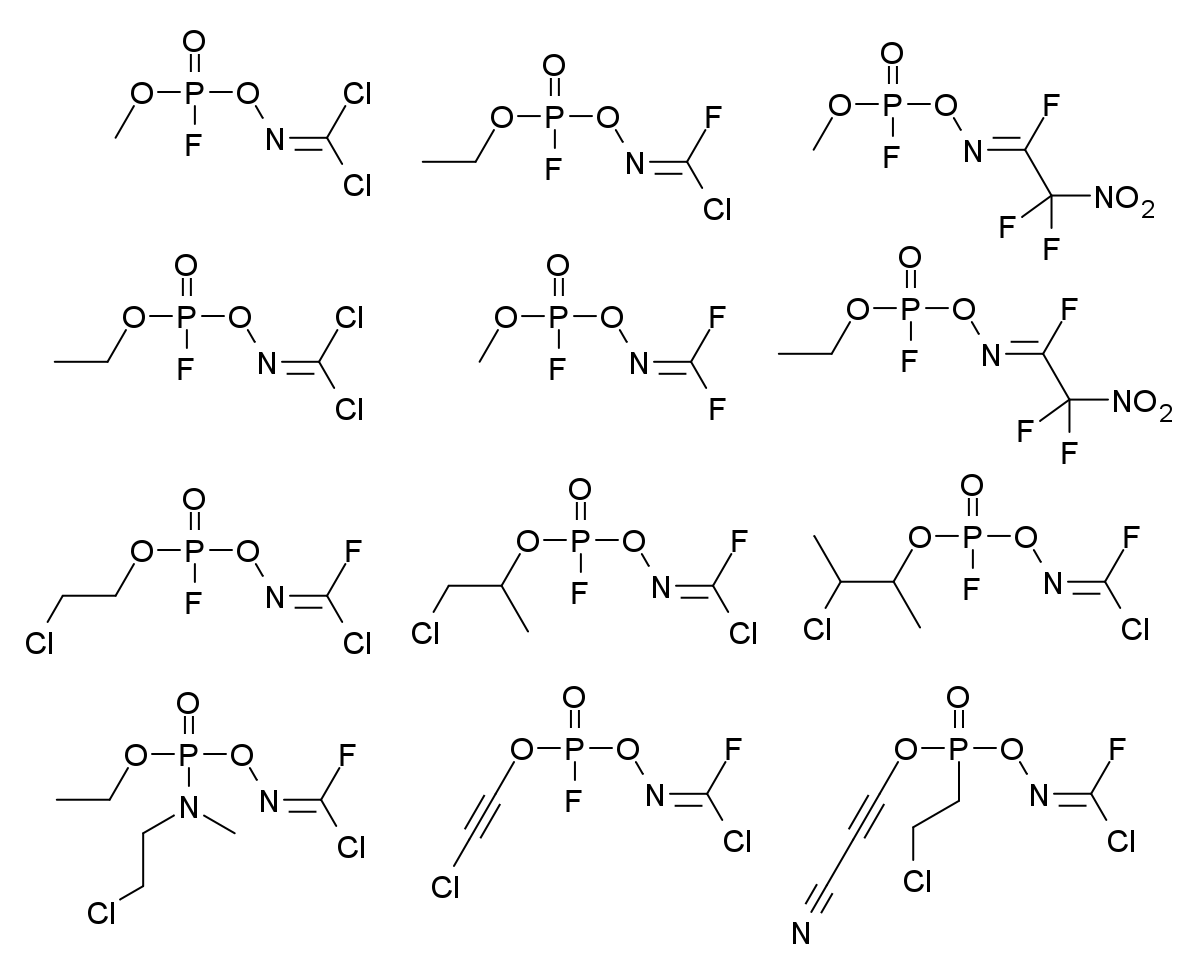
Examples of structures claimed as Novichok agents

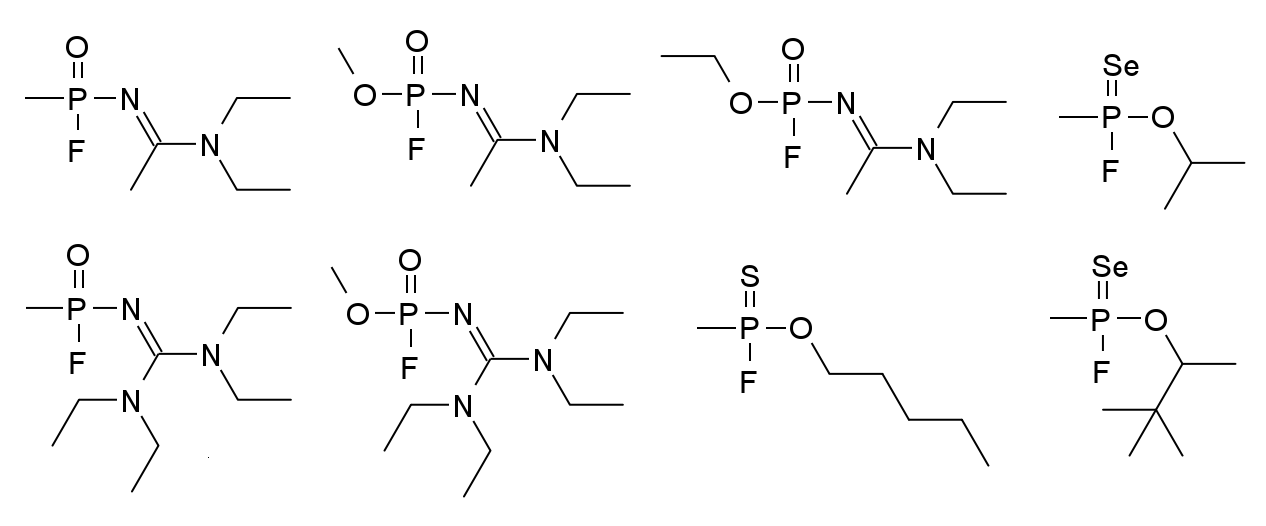
Mirzayanov's further examples of structures claimed as Novichok agents

Mirzayanov provided the first description of these agents. Dispersed in an ultra-fine powder instead of a gas or a vapour, they have unique qualities. A binary agent was then created that would mimic the same properties but would either be manufactured using materials which are not controlled substances under the CWC, or be undetectable by treaty regime inspections. The most potent compounds from this family, Novichok-5 and Novichok-7, are supposedly around five to eight times more potent than VX. The "Novichok" designation refers to the binary form of the agent, with the final compound being referred to by its code number (e.g. A-232). The first Novichok series compound was in fact the binary form of a known V-series nerve agent, VR, while the later Novichok agents are the binary forms of compounds such as A-232 and A-234.

Chemical structure of the Novichok agent known as A-230

According to a classified (secret) report by the US Army National Ground Intelligence Center in Military Intelligence Digest dated 24 January 1997, agent designated A-232 and its ethyl analogue A-234 developed under the Foliant programme "are as toxic as VX, as resistant to treatment as soman, and more difficult to detect and easier to manufacture than VX". The binary versions of the agents reportedly use acetonitrile and an organic phosphate "that can be disguised as a pesticide precursor."

Example of a declared Novichok derivative, researched in Iran in 2016

The agent A-234 is also supposedly around five to eight times more potent than VX.

The median lethal dose for inhaled A-234 has been estimated as 7 mg/m^{3} for two minute exposure (minute volume of 15 L, slight activity). The median lethal dose for inhaled A-230, likely the most toxic liquid Novichok, has been estimated as between 1.9 and 3 mg/m^{3} for two minute exposure. Thus the median lethal dose for inhaled A-234 is 0.2 mg (5000 lethal doses in a gram) and is below 0.1 mg for A-230 (10 000 lethal doses in a gram).

Chemical structure of the Novichok agent known as A-234

The agents are reportedly capable of being delivered as a liquid, aerosol or gas via a variety of systems, including artillery shells, bombs, missiles and spraying devices.

=== Controversy over formulation ===
Mirzayanov gives somewhat different structures for Novichok agents in his autobiography than those which have been identified by Western experts. The Western formulations suffered from imperfect information, as can be seen in Fig. 1 of Chai et al in which Mirzayanov describes a family of compounds whereas Western scientists instantiate a particular salt.

Mirzyanov makes clear that a large number of compounds were made, and many of the less potent derivatives were reported in the open literature as new organophosphate insecticides, so that the secret chemical weapons program could be disguised as legitimate pesticide research.

=== Chemistry ===
According to chemical weapons expert Jonathan Tucker, the first binary formulation developed under the Foliant programme was used to make Substance 33 (VR), very similar to the more widely known VX, differing only in the alkyl substituents on its nitrogen and oxygen atoms. "This weapon was given the code name Novichok."

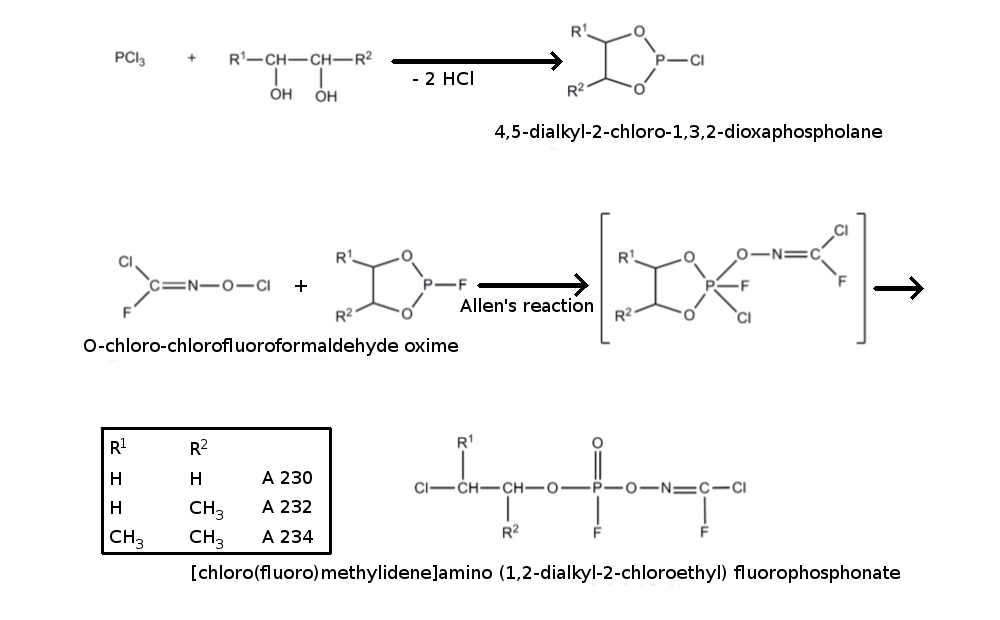
Synthesis of the A230, A232, and A234 structures as described in Hoenig. Ethanediol modified with up to two methyl groups is reacted with phosphorus trichloride to form a ring structure named as a phospholane analogue. The last chlorine atom is replaced by fluorine (nucleophilic substitution). This compound is then reacted with a phosgene oxime-like chloride to open the ring and create the product fluorophosphonate.

A wide range of potential structures have been reported. These all feature the classical organophosphorus core (sometimes with the P=O replaced with P=S or P=Se), which is most commonly depicted as being a phosphoramidate or phosphonate, usually fluorinated (cf. monofluorophosphate). The organic groups are subject to more variety; however, a common substituent is phosgene oxime or analogues thereof. This is a potent chemical weapon in its own right, specifically as a nettle agent, and would be expected to increase the harm done by the Novichok agent. Many claimed structures from this group also contain cross-linking agent motifs which may covalently bind to the acetylcholinesterase enzyme's active site in several places, perhaps explaining the rapid denaturing of the enzyme that is claimed to be characteristic of the Novichok agents.

Zoran Radić, a chemist at the University of California, San Diego, performed an in silico docking study with Mirzayanov's version of the A-232 structure against the active site of the acetylcholinesterase enzyme. The model predicted a tight fit with high binding affinity and formation of a covalent bond to a serine residue in the active site, with a similar binding mode to established nerve agents such as sarin and soman.

=== Detection ===
A procedure of retrospective detection of Novichok type poisons in victim's tissues was proposed in 2021-2. This method is a modification of the procedure that was developed earlier for identification of sarin poisoning. This method capitalizes on the fact that poisoning by organic phosphonates occurs via phosphonylation of the hydroxy group of serine in the active site of cholinesterases, and that severe poisoning occurs when a major part of these enzymes are inactivated. The concentration of butyryl cholinesterase (HuBuChE) in human plasma is normally about 80 nM. That makes it a good source of adducts that can be subjected to analysis.

The procedure consists of three steps (see the Figure A). First, HuBuChE is obtained from the victim's plasma. Second, the enzyme is subjected to pepsin proteolysis. Third, the peptide mixture obtained is subjected to LC-MSMS analysis. If no poisoning took place, the peptide mixture contains a non-modified nonapeptide FGESAGAAS. However, cholinesterases are inactivated due to a chemical reaction with Novichok type nerve agent, the modified nonapeptide is be detected, and its exact (high resolution) mass (along with the mass of the secondary ion produced during collision induced dissociation) allows unambiguous identification of the fact of poisoning and the exact structure of the poison. Thus, the example at Figure A shows the masses of the primary and secondary ions obtained from the plasma of the victim poisoned by A-230. If a victim is poisoned by other Novichok type agents, the masses are different.

This method allows identification of poisons at a few parts per billion, but that may be insufficient for reliable detection of the isotopic signature of the adducts, and therefore an unambiguous identification of the geographic origin of the poison.

Figure A. Procedure of retrospective assessment of exposure to Novichok type nerve agent. A-230 is used as an example. Ser-198 (the active site residue whose phosphonylation irreversibly inactivates the enzyme) is shown in red. The ion with m/z of 970.34750 is directly detected during LC-MS, whereas the ion with m/z of 193.11002 is observed during collision induced dissociation experiments.

== Lifetime ==
According to Vladimir Uglev, who headed a group that worked on the development of the Novichok agents, at least one liquid form of Novichok is very stable with a slow evaporation rate and can remain potent for possibly up to 50 years. Insufficient research has been conducted to fully understand its persistence in various situations in the environment.

== Effects and countermeasures ==
As nerve agents, the Novichok agents belong to the class of organophosphate acetylcholinesterase inhibitors. These chemical compounds inhibit the enzyme acetylcholinesterase, preventing the normal breakdown of the neurotransmitter acetylcholine. Acetylcholine concentrations then increase at neuromuscular junctions to cause involuntary contraction of all skeletal muscles (cholinergic crisis). This then leads to respiratory and cardiac arrest (as the victim's heart and diaphragm muscles no longer function normally) and finally death from heart failure or suffocation as copious fluid secretions fill the victim's lungs.

As can be seen with other organophosphate poisonings, Novichok agents may cause lasting nerve damage, resulting in permanent disablement of victims, according to Russian scientists. Their effect on humans was demonstrated by the accidental exposure of Andrei Zheleznyakov, one of the scientists involved in their development, to the residue of an unspecified Novichok agent while working in a Moscow laboratory in May 1987. He was critically injured and took ten days to recover consciousness after the incident. He lost the ability to walk and was treated at a secret clinic in Leningrad for three months afterwards. The agent caused permanent harm, with effects that included "chronic weakness in his arms, a toxic hepatitis that gave rise to cirrhosis of the liver, epilepsy, spells of severe depression, and an inability to read or concentrate that left him totally disabled and unable to work." He never recovered and, after five years of deteriorating health, died in July 1992.

The use of a fast-acting peripheral anticholinergic drug such as atropine can block the receptors where acetylcholine acts to prevent poisoning (as in the treatment for poisoning by other acetylcholinesterase inhibitors). Atropine, however, is difficult to administer safely, because its effective dose for nerve agent poisoning is close to the dose at which patients suffer severe side effects, such as changes in heart rate and thickening of the bronchial secretions, which fill the lungs of someone suffering nerve agent poisoning so that suctioning of these secretions, and other advanced life support techniques, may be necessary in addition to administration of atropine to treat nerve agent poisoning.

In the treatment of nerve agent poisoning, atropine is most often administered along with a Hagedorn oxime such as pralidoxime, obidoxime, TMB-4, or HI-6, which reactivates acetylcholinesterase which has been inactivated by phosphorylation by an organophosphorus nerve agent and relieves the respiratory muscle paralysis caused by some nerve agents. Pralidoxime is not effective in reactivating acetylcholinesterase inhibited by some older nerve agents such as soman or the Novichok nerve agents, described in the literature as being up to eight times more toxic than the nerve agent VX.

The US Army has funded studies of the use of galantamine along with atropine in the treatment of a number of nerve agents, including soman and the Novichok agents. An unexpected synergistic interaction was seen to occur between galantamine (given between five hours before to thirty minutes after exposure) and atropine in an amount of 6 mg/kg or higher. Increasing the dose of galantamine from 5 to 8 mg/kg decreased the dose of atropine needed to protect experimental animals from the toxicity of soman in dosages 1.5 times the LD50 (lethal dose in half the animals studied).

There have been differing claims about the persistence of Novichok and binary precursors in the environment. One view is that it is not affected by normal weather conditions, and may not decompose as quickly as other organophosphates. However, Mirzayanov states that Novichok decomposes within four months.

== Instances of usage ==
=== Poisoning of Ivan Kivelidi and Zara Ismailova ===
Supposed Novichok agent formula from the forensic analysis in the Kivelidi case

A Novichok agent was used in 1995 to poison Russian banker Ivan Kivelidi, who died three days later in a hospital at the age of 46. The poison was believed to have been applied to Kivelidi's office phone in Moscow. His secretary Zara Ismailova also developed symptoms one month later and then died a day later in a hospital at the age of 35. Kivelidi was the head of the Russian Business Round Table, and had close ties to Viktor Chernomyrdin, who was at that time Prime Minister of Russia. Russian opposition–linked historians Yuri Felshtinsky and Vladimir Pribylovsky speculated that the murder became "one of the first in the series of poisonings organised by Russia's security services".

The Russian Ministry of Internal Affairs analysed the substance and announced that it was "a phosphorus-based military-grade nerve agent" "whose formula was strictly classified". According to Nesterov, the administrative head of Shikhany, he did not know of "a single case of such poison being sold illegally" and noted that the poison "is used by professional spies".

Vladimir Khutsishvili, a former business partner of Kivelidi's, was subsequently convicted of the killings. According to The Independent, "A closed trial found that his business partner had obtained the substance via intermediaries from an employee of the State Research Institute of Organic Chemistry and Technology (ГосНИИОХТ / GosNIIOKhT), which was involved in the development of Novichok agents. However, Khutsishvili, who claimed that he was innocent, had not been detained at the time of the trial and freely left the country. He was only arrested in 2006 after he returned to Russia, believing that the ten-year old case was closed. Felshtinsky and Pribylovsky claimed that Russia's security services, which had access to the chemical agent, had framed Khutsishvili for the murder, and that the security services had organised the murder on the orders of a senior Russian state official. Boris Kuznetsov, who represented Khutsishvili and believed in his innocence, blames "rogue intelligence officers".

Leonid Rink, an employee of GosNIIOKhT, received a one-year suspended sentence for selling Novichok agents to unnamed buyers "of Chechen ethnicity" soon after the poisoning of Kivelidi and Izmailova.

=== Poisoning of Sergei and Yulia Skripal ===
On 12 March 2018, the UK government said that a Novichok agent had been used in an attack in the English city of Salisbury on 4 March 2018 in an attempt to kill former GRU officer Sergei Skripal and his daughter Yulia. British Prime Minister Theresa May said in Parliament: "Either this was a direct action by the Russian state against our country, or the Russian government lost control of its potentially catastrophically damaging nerve agent and allowed it to get into the hands of others." On 13 March the BBC asked Vladimir Putin if Russia was "behind the poisoning of" Skripal and he answered "Get to the bottom of it first then we can discuss it" while he delegated a spokesperson to claim that "a circus show in the British parliament" was the upshot. Boris Johnson, the Foreign Secretary, refused to shake hands with Russian ambassador Alexander Yakovenko as he expressed "outrage" over the attack. On the next day, the UK expelled 23 Russian diplomats after the Russian government refused to meet the UK's deadline of midnight on 13 March 2018 to give an explanation for the use of the substance. Addressing the United Nations Security Council on 15 March, Vassily Nebenzia, the Russian envoy to the UN, responded to the British allegations by denying that Russia had ever produced or researched the agents, stating: "No scientific research or development under the title Novichok were carried out."

After the attack, 21 members of the emergency services and public were checked for possible exposure, and three were hospitalised. As of 12 March, one police officer remained in hospital. Five hundred members of the public were advised to decontaminate their possessions to prevent possible long-term exposure, and 180 members of the military and 18 vehicles were deployed to assist with decontamination at locations in and around Salisbury. Up to 38 people in Salisbury have been affected by the agent to an undetermined extent.

Daniel Gerstein, a former senior official at the U.S. Department of Homeland Security, said it was possible that Novichok nerve agents had been used before in Britain to assassinate Kremlin targets, but had not been detected: "It's entirely likely that we have seen someone expire from this and not realised it. We realised in this case because they were found unresponsive on a park bench. Had it been a higher dose, maybe they would have died and we would have thought it was natural causes."

On 20 March 2018, Ahmet Üzümcü, Director-General of the OPCW, said that it would take "another two to three weeks to finalise the analysis" of samples taken from the poisoning of Skripal. On 3 April 2018, the Defence Science and Technology Laboratory announced that it was "completely confident" that the agent used was Novichok, although they still did not know the "precise source" of the agent. Experts said that their findings did not challenge the conclusions by UK government: "We provided that information to the Government who have then used a number of other sources to come to the conclusions that they have." On 12 April 2018 the OPCW announced that their investigations agreed with the conclusions made by the UK about the identity of the chemical used.

By September 2018, two Russian "tourists", "Alexander Petrov" and "Ruslan Boshirov", had been identified as suspects. They told Margarita Simonyan, the chief editor of RT television, in an interview that they both worked in the sports nutrition business and that: "Those are our real names.. We're afraid to go out, we fear for ourselves, our lives and lives of our loved ones." The Crown Prosecution Service announced enough evidence was obtained by that date "to convict the two men" of the attack, although it did not apply to Russia "for their extradition because Russia does not extradite its own nationals. [...] However, a European Arrest Warrant has been obtained in case they travel to the EU".

In February 2019, the Bellingcat website published precise allegations that identified GRU Major Denis Vyacheslavovich Sergeev as a man who travelled in March 2018 to London under the false identity of Sergei Fedotov. It is claimed with detailed photograph evidence, and phone, travel, passport, and motoring database records that GRU Colonels Alexander Mishkin and Anatoly Chepiga assumed the identities of Petrov and Boshirov, and placed the poison on Skripal's doorknob. On 28 June 2019, it was reported that Sergeyev received instructions from his GRU superior by cell phone on more than ten occasions during his UK visits.

=== Poisoning of Charlie Rowley and Dawn Sturgess ===
On 30 June 2018, Charlie Rowley and Dawn Sturgess were found unconscious at a house in Amesbury, Wiltshire, about eight miles from the Salisbury poisoning site. On 4 July 2018, police said that the pair had been poisoned with the same nerve agent as ex-Russian spy Sergei Skripal.

On 8 July 2018, Sturgess died as a result of the poisoning. Rowley regained consciousness and began recovering in hospital. He told his brother Matthew the nerve agent had been in a small perfume or aftershave bottle, which they had found in a park about nine days before spraying themselves with it. The police later closed and fingertip-searched Queen Elizabeth Gardens in Salisbury.

=== Poisoning of Emilian Gebrev ===
In the aftermath of the Skripal poisoning, investigative journalists were able to track some of the people involved also in Bulgaria. This is how another suspected poisoning case dating back to April 2015 during their stay in the country was linked to the Novichok nerve agent. The victim was the Bulgarian arms dealer Emilian Gebrev, who shared two hypotheses why he might have been attacked: The first one links to the fact that his arms manufacturing company Dunarit exports defense equipment to Ukraine. The other one relates to an attempt by an offshore company to take over Dunarit. The takeover attempt was ultimately linked to the influential Bulgarian politician and oligarch Delyan Peevski who has historically been funded by Russia's state-owned VTB Bank. In November 2023 Bulgaria sought the extradition of three Russian GRU officers, Sergey Fedotov, Georgi Gorshkov and Sergey Pavlov, suspected of the poisoning incident. Sergei Fedotov was also the alias used by one of the assassins in the Salisbury poisonings.

=== Poisoning of Alexei Navalny ===
On 20 August 2020, Russian opposition leader Alexei Navalny fell ill during a flight from Tomsk to Moscow. The plane made an emergency landing in Omsk, where Navalny was hospitalized and put in a medically induced coma. His family suspected his illness was caused by a poison put into a cup of tea he drank before the flight. He was evacuated to the Charité hospital in Berlin, Germany, the following day. On 2 September, the German government said that it had "unequivocal evidence" that Navalny was poisoned by a Novichok agent after tests at a German military lab and had called on the Russian government for an explanation, with labs in France and Sweden corroborating the findings.

On 4 September, the North Atlantic Council was briefed by the German representative on the "appalling assassination attempt on" Navalny. In a post-meeting press conference, Secretary-General Jens Stoltenberg said that NATO allies "agree that Russia has serious questions it must answer", that the OPCW needed to conduct an impartial investigation, that "those responsible for this attack must be brought to justice" and called on Russia to "provide complete disclosure of the Novichok programme to the OPCW."

Navalny had been out of his coma since 7 September.

On 6 October, the OPCW confirmed the presence of a cholinesterase inhibitor from the Novichok group in Navalny's blood and urine samples. At the same time, the OPCW report clarified that Navalny was poisoned with a new type of Novichok, which was not included in the list of controlled chemicals of the Chemical Weapons Convention.

== See also ==
- Poison laboratory of the Soviet secret services
- Russia and weapons of mass destruction

=== List of Novichok agents ===
- A-230
- A-232
- A-234
- A-242
- A-262 (Novichok-7)
- C01-A035
- C01-A039
- C01-A042
