= A-234 (nerve agent) =

A-234 (according to Mirzayanov)
- Chemical structure of A-234 according to Mirzayanov

Names
- IUPAC name ethyl N-[(1E)-1-(diethylamino)ethylidene]-phosphoramidofluoridate
- Other names N-2-diethylaminomethylacetamido-ethoxyphosphonofluoridate

Identifiers
CAS Number	2387496-06-0
3D model (JSmol)	Interactive image
ChEBI	CHEBI:140425
ChemSpider	64808787
PubChem CID	132472361
CompTox Dashboard (EPA)	DTXSID60896946
- InChI: InChI=1S/C8H18FN2O2P/c1-5-11(6-2)8(4)10-14(9,12)13-7-3/h5-7H2,1-4H3/b10-8+ Key: SBPSVLLDDYOPDZ-CSKARUKUSA-N
- SMILES: CCOP(F)(=O)\N=C(/C)\N(CC)CC

Properties
Chemical formula	C_{8}H_{18}FN_{2}O_{2}P
Molar mass	224.216 g·mol^{−1}
- Except where otherwise noted, data are given for materials in their standard state (at 25 °C [77 °F], 100 kPa). Infobox references

A-234 is an organophosphate nerve agent. It was developed in the Soviet Union under the FOLIANT program and is one of the group of compounds referred to as Novichok agents that were revealed by Vil Mirzayanov. In March 2018, the Russian ambassador to the UK, Alexander Yakovenko, claimed to have been informed by British authorities that A-234 had been identified as the agent used in the poisoning of Sergei and Yulia Skripal in Salisbury. Vladimir Uglev, a Russian chemist who worked on the Novichok series of compounds, said he was "99 percent sure that it was A-234" in relation to the 2018 Amesbury poisonings that resulted in the death of Dawn Sturgess and the poisoning of another British national, noting its unusually high persistence in the environment.

According to a classified report by the United States Army National Ground Intelligence Center, the agent designated as A-232 and its ethyl analog A-234, developed under the FOLIANT program, were "as toxic as VX, as resistant to treatment as soman, and more difficult to detect and easier to manufacture than VX".

No certain data on toxicity exist but it is estimated that the median lethal concentration of A-234 is 7 mg/m^{3}. This means that half of 70 kg individuals under slight physical activity – breathing 15 litres of air per minute – would die within two minutes of exposure. This equates to a median lethal dose of 0.2 mg via respiration.

== Regulated chemical under the Chemical Weapons Convention ==
As of 7 June 2020, A-234 has been added to Schedule 1 of the Annex on Chemicals of the Chemical Weapons Convention and it has been explicitly named as an example compound for schedule 1.A.14. For chemicals listed in Schedule 1, the most stringent declaration and verification measures are in place combined with far-reaching limits and bans on production and use. It is notable to say that Annex 1 does not explicitly relate this structure to the name A-234, instead adding this particular structure to the prohibited compounds section.

== Alternative structure ==
A-234 (according to Hoenig)
- Chemical structure of A-234 according to Hoenig

Names
- IUPAC name ([(2-chloro-1-methylpropoxy)fluorohydroxyphosphinyl]oxy)carbonimidic chloride fluoride

Identifiers
CAS Number	26102-99-8
3D model (JSmol)	Interactive image
CompTox Dashboard (EPA)	DTXSID60896946
- InChI: InChI=1S/C5H8Cl2F2NO3P/c1-3(6)4(2)12-14(9,11)13-10-5(7)8/h3-4H,1-2H3/b10-5- Key: ROJDTMHBTCCYOZ-YHYXMXQVSA-N
- SMILES: F\C(\Cl)=N/OP(=O)(F)OC(C)C(C)Cl

Properties
Chemical formula	C_{5}H_{8}Cl_{2}F_{2}NO_{3}P
Molar mass	269.99 g·mol^{−1}
- Except where otherwise noted, data are given for materials in their standard state (at 25 °C [77 °F], 100 kPa). Infobox references

An alternative structure for A-234 and the related Novichok agents had previously been proposed by Western chemical weapons experts such as Steven Hoenig and D. Hank Ellison. These structures were supported by Soviet literature of the time and were tested as acetylcholinesterase inhibitors, however Mirzayanov explained that a number of weaker agents developed as part of the Foliant program were published in the open literature as organophosphate pesticides, in order to disguise the secret nerve agent program as legitimate pesticide research.

However, the presence of a carbonimidic chloride fluoride group and a dimethylchloroethyl group suggest that this molecule is a member of the C-series of organophosphate agents (C01), with additional mustard and (chlorofluoro-)phosgene oxime radicals, added to produce skin and lung toxicity as well as blistering effects.

== See also ==
- C01-A035
- C01-A039
- A-208
- A-233 (VR analogue)
- A-230
- A-235
- A-242
- A-243
- A-255
- A-256 (cycloheptoxy seleno-VX)
- VP
