= Toxic Terror (book) =

2000 book edited by Jonathan B. Tucker

Toxic Terror: Assessing Terrorist Use of Chemical and Biological Weapons (2000) is a MIT Press book edited by Jonathan B. Tucker which has twelve chapters by different authors discussing use of chemical and biological weapons by terrorists from 1946 to 1998. Only three groups caused "mass casualties" and only one attack (the 1995 Tokyo subway sarin attack) approached terrorism. The book therefore shows that the groups were not able to achieve much damage with these unconventional weapons, contrary to warnings of an extreme threat.
