= Vladimir Uglev =

Soviet chemist

Vladimir Uglev was a Soviet chemist, credited with designing Novichok, a nerve agent considered a chemical weapon. He later became an outspoken Russian dissident, having publically criticised Russian President Vladimir Putin. Famously, he revealed that it was Novichok strain A-234 that had been used in the botched assassination attempt on Sergei Skripal and Yulia Skripal.

Uglev was born in Kirovsk, Murmansk Oblast where his father, Ivan Uglev, had been sent as punishment for political dissent.

He studied chemistry at Dmitry Mendeleev University of Chemical Technology in Moscow, where he obtained his Ph.d in 1975. After graduation he worked at GosNIIOKhT, the State Research Institute of Organic Chemistry and Technology, in the chemical weapons programme of the Soviet Defence Ministry, until 1990.

Uglev died on 26 October 26 aged 80. The place of death was Anapa, Russia and cause of death was complications of a heart attack.
