= Lev Fyodorov =

Russian chemist

- Born: Lev Alexandrovich Fyodorov; June 10, 1936
- Died: August 12, 2017 (aged 81)
- Education: Moscow State University
- Scientific career
- Fields: Chemistry

Lev Alexandrovich Fyodorov (sometimes Fedorov; Russian Лев Александрович Фёдоров; 10 June 1936, Moscow,- 12 August 2017) was a Russian chemist.

He was employed at the V. I. Vernadskiy Institute of Geochemistry and Analytical Chemistry of the Russian Academy of Sciences, and became a member of the New York Academy of Sciences.

Fyodorov was a chemical warfare officer. After studying chemistry at Lomonosov University, he received his doctorate in 1967 and his habilitation in 1983. After the end of the Soviet era, he published papers on chemical and biological weapons and chemical security. Together with Vil Mirzayanov, he is particularly noted for his part in the publication of details regarding the discovery of Novichok nerve agents, and the subsequent court case against Mirzayanov.

== Achievements ==
In 1967 Fyodorov received his candidate degree in chemistry and he subsequently defended his doctorate thesis in 1983. He has authored several monographs and articles in the field of physical chemistry and from 1983 his work focused on the environmental issues concerning dioxins.

Fyodorov was the author of articles in Chemosphere (1993) (Dioxin problem in Russian chemical industry, Ecological problems in Russia caused by dioxin emissions from chemical industry)> also articles in "Успехи химии" ("Successes of Chemistry") (1990), and in the journal "Химия и жизнь" ("Chemistry and Life") (1990-1994). His writings were also published in local and central newspapers, and he authored monographs (e.g. "Dioxins as an environmental danger: retrospective and perspective" (1993)) and was participant and speaker at annual international dioxin congresses (beginning in 1992).

In 1992, he founded and registered the Russian Anti-dioxin Association and by July he published an article on Soviet chemical weapons in the weekly "Top Secret". As a result of this, in October he was accused of divulging state secrets in the "Moscow News". He wrote two monographs on this topic, published by the Center of Environmental Policy of Russia ("Chemical Weapons in Russia: History, Ecology, Politics" (1994) and "Undeclared Chemical War in Russia: Policy against Ecology" (1995)). Subsequently he dealt with related problems in environmental chemistry - pesticides, rocket fuel, biological weapons, etc.

On October 15, 1993, at the first meeting of the Union "For Chemical Safety" (registered as a public environmental organization in 1996) he was elected its president.

== Publications ==
- Chemical Weapons in Russia: History, Ecology, Politics, 1994 (Online)
- We Were Preparing for an All-Out Chemical War, 1995
