= VR (nerve agent) =

- Skeletal formula of VR

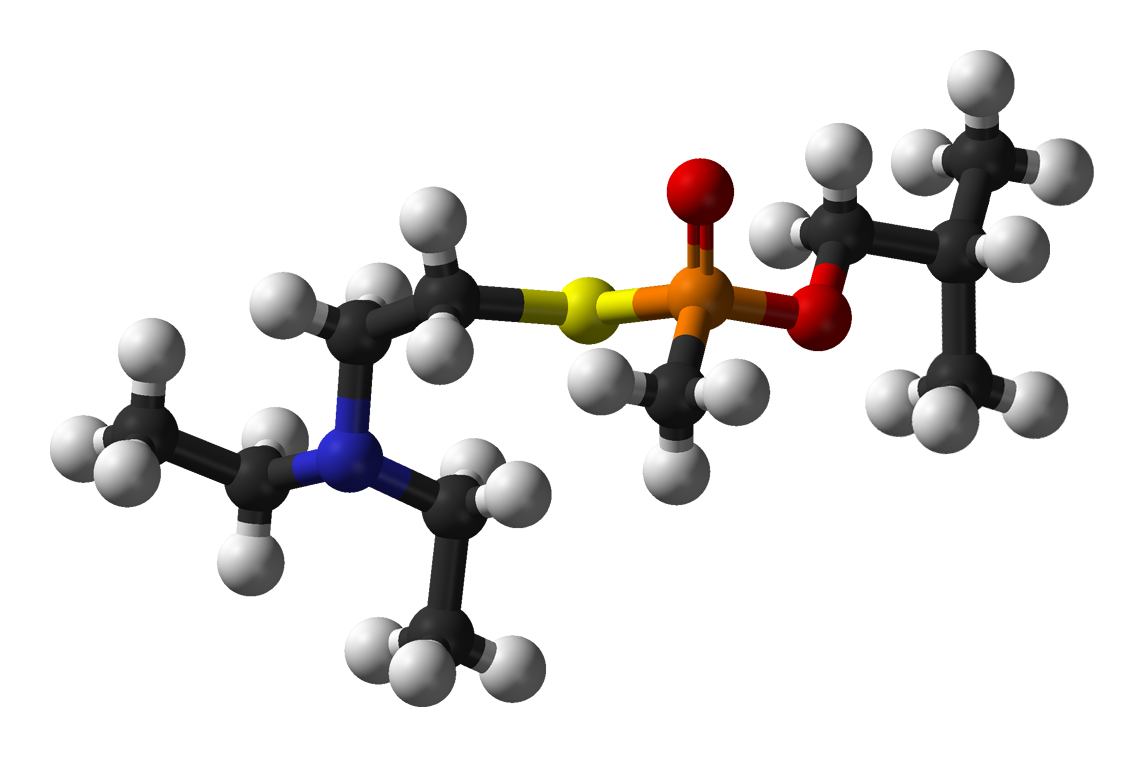
- Ball-and-stick model of VR

Names
- Preferred IUPAC name S-[2-(Diethylamino)ethyl] O-(2-methylpropyl) methylphosphonothioate

Identifiers
CAS Number	159939-87-4
3D model (JSmol)	Interactive image
ChEBI	CHEBI:140422
ChemSpider	154981
PubChem CID	178033
UNII	LG34LSI9IU
CompTox Dashboard (EPA)	DTXSID10897226
- InChI: InChI=1S/C11H26NO2PS/c1-6-12(7-2)8-9-16-15(5,13)14-10-11(3)4/h11H,6-10H2,1-5H3 Key: MNLAVFKVRUQAKW-UHFFFAOYSA-N; InChI=1/C11H26NO2PS/c1-6-12(7-2)8-9-16-15(5,13)14-10-11(3)4/h11H,6-10H2,1-5H3 Key: MNLAVFKVRUQAKW-UHFFFAOYAF
- SMILES: CCN(CC)CCSP(=O)(C)OCC(C)C

Properties
Chemical formula	C_{11}H_{26}NO_{2}PS
Molar mass	267.368 g/mol
- Except where otherwise noted, data are given for materials in their standard state (at 25 °C [77 °F], 100 kPa). verify (what is ?) Infobox references

VR (Russian VX, VXr, Soviet V-gas, GOSNIIOKhT substance No. 33, Agent "November") is a "V-series" unitary nerve agent closely related (it is an isomer) to the better-known VX nerve agent. It became a prototype for the series of Novichok agents. According to chemical weapons expert Jonathan Tucker, the first binary formulation developed under the Soviet Foliant program was used to make Substance 33, differing from VX only in the alkyl substituents on its nitrogen and oxygen atoms. "This weapon was given the code name Novichok."

== History ==
The development of VR started in 1957, after the Soviet Union obtained information about detection of high level of toxicity in phosphorylthiocholines (the same year Lars-Erik Tammelin published his first articles on fluorophosphorylcholines and phosphorylthiocholines in Acta Chemica Scandinavica) by a team from the Soviet Union's Scientific Research Institute No. 42 (NII-42). Sergei Zotovich Ivin, Leonid Soborovsky, and Iya Danilovna Shilakova jointly developed this analogue of VX. They completed their work in 1963 and were later awarded the Lenin Prize for their achievement. A binary weapon comprising two less toxic precursors which mixed during flight to form Substance 33 was later developed by a team led by Nikolai Kuznetsov.

In 1972 the Soviets opened Cheboksary Khimprom, a manufacturing plant for VR in Novocheboksarsk. All facilities in USSR produced 15,557 tons of VR according to their declaration to the Organisation for the Prohibition of Chemical Weapons (OPCW), although most if not all of this has now been destroyed under disarmament treaties.

== Comparison to VX ==
VR has similar lethal dose levels to VX (10 – 50 mg), as well as being similar in appearance. However, due to usage of diethylamino radicals instead of diisopropylamino it is more prone to decomposition. The former are worse at sterically protecting the nitrogen atom from attacking either phosphorus or the α-carbon atom adjacent to sulfur than the latter. According to UK Defence Science and Technology Laboratory Detection Department scientists Robin M. Black and John M. Harrison, chemical stability was an important factor why of all the similarly toxic phosphorylthiocholines, ethyl N-2-diisopropylaminoethyl methylphosphonothiolate in particular (now known as VX), was weaponized in the West.

According to Russian CW developer Vil Mirzayanov, in the late 1980s a group of GosNIIOKhT chemists led by Georgiy Drozd prepared a scientific report that Substance 33 had much lower shelf life than VX. The report, writes Mirzayanov, caused 'panic' in the institute top management and the military representative office, and later was met with administrative resistance. This finding was independently verified by another chemist Igor Revelskiy but his report was not approved either.

Following the poisoning of Sergei and Yulia Skripal, former head of the GosNIIOKhT security department Nikolay Volodin said in an interview to Novaya Gazeta that Substance 33 was decomposing too quickly in combat conditions, and implied that this fact may have influenced the decision to continue research on the Novichok program.

== Toxicity ==
Both agents have similar symptoms and method of action to other nerve agents that act on cholinesterase, and treatment remains the same. However, the window for effectively treating second generation V series seizures is shorter, as they rapidly denature the acetylcholinesterase protein in a similar manner to soman, making treatment with the standard nerve gas antidote pralidoxime ineffective unless it is given very soon after exposure. Pre-treatment with pyridostigmine prior to exposure, and treatment with other drugs such as atropine and diazepam after exposure, will reduce symptoms of nerve agent toxicity but may not be sufficient to prevent death if a large dose of nerve agent has been absorbed. In addition to the standard seizures, some of the second generation V series agents are known to cause comas.

== See also ==
- A-234 (nerve agent)
- Novichok agent
