= Nikita Isaev =

Russian politician, journalist, and activist (1978–2019)

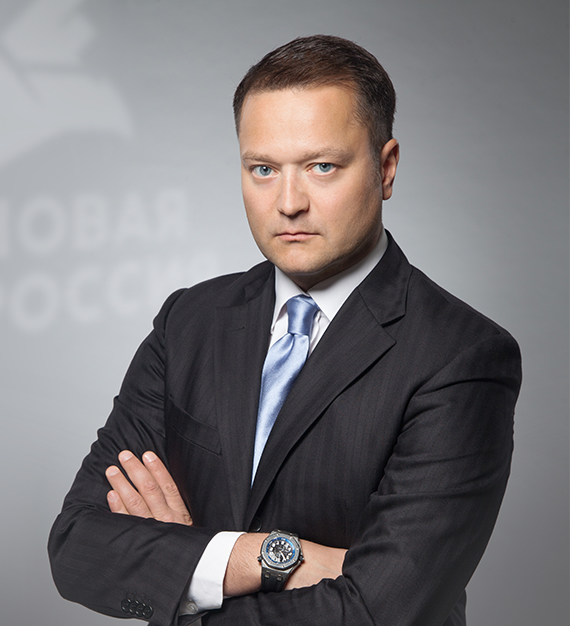
- Born: 12 November 1978; Moscow
- Died: 16 November 2019 (aged 41)
- Occupation: Politician

Nikita Olegovich Isaev (Russian: Никита Олегович Исаев; 12 November 1978 – 16 November 2019) was a Russian politician, journalist, and anti-corruption and environmental activist.

Before his death, Isaev was the former head of the New Russia movement and was appointed as an adviser for regional development by Sergei Mironov. In 2019, he died on a train from Tambov to Moscow. The official cause of death was a heart attack. In 2021, a joint-investigation by Der Spiegel, Bellingcat and The Insider linked the Federal Security Service (FSB) unit that allegedly poisoned the opposition leader Alexei Navalny to Isaev's death, saying that FSB agents had followed him since December 2018. The investigation noted that Isaev was loyal to the Kremlin but was known to have a fraught relationship with the FSB, which makes it difficult to identify a possible motive for him to be killed by the FSB. However, they noted that Isaev traveled abroad frequently, and had purchased flight tickets for a family trip to Miami on 5 December 2019 (three weeks after his death). The investigators therefore consider the possibility that the FSB may have suspected that Isaev was about to defect.
