= Ruslan Magomedragimov =

Russian activist

Ruslan Magomedragimov (Russian: Руслан Магомедкасумович Магомедрагимов) was a Russian activist from Dagestan. He was involved with the movement "Sadval" (Unity), advocating for the autonomy or independence of the Lezgin people.

He was found dead on 24 March 2015 in Kaspiysk under suspicious circumstances, although the official investigation concluded he died from natural causes.

Sadval movement issued a statement in which its leader, Nazim Hajiyev, publicly stated that he was convinced that Magomedragimov had been killed due to his activism. (Hajiyev himself would be murdered a year later.)

In 2021, an investigation by Spiegel, Bellingcat and The Insider, suggested that Magomedragimov might have been the victim of the same FSB team that was involved in the poisoning of Alexei Navalny.
