= Jonathan B. Tucker =

American political scientist (1954–2011)

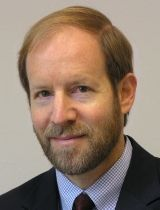
- Born: August 2, 1954; Boston, Massachusetts, U.S.
- Died: July 31, 2011 (aged 56); Washington, D.C., U.S.
- Education: Massachusetts Institute of Technology, Ph.D. Yale University, B.S.
- Occupations: Chemical and biological weapons expert
- Title: Doctor
- Website: FAS Staff Profile

Jonathan B. Tucker (August 2, 1954 – July 31, 2011) was an American political scientist and expert on chemical and biological weapons.

== Early life and education ==
Tucker was born on August 2, 1954, in Boston, Massachusetts, to Deborah Tucker. Tucker earned a B.S. in biology from Yale University and a Ph.D. in political science (focusing on defense and arms control study) from MIT.

== Career ==
After finishing his studies Tucker worked as an arms control specialist for the Congressional Office of Technology Assessment, the U.S. Arms Control & Disarmament Agency, and the U.S. State Department. He was an editor at High Technology and Scientific American magazines and wrote about military technologies, biotechnology, and biomedical research. Tucker was a UN weapons biological inspector in Iraq in February 1995.

From 1996, he served as founding director of the Chemical and Biological Weapons Nonproliferation Program at the James Martin Center for Nonproliferation Studies of the Monterey Institute of International Studies, and then served as a senior fellow in its Washington Office. He was a professional staff member for the bipartisan Commission on the Prevention of WMD proliferation and terrorism, which published World at Risk, a volume critical of US prevention strategies for post-9/11 terrorism.

In 2010, Tucker spent a semester teaching and researching at the TU Darmstadt in Germany as an endowed professor of peace and security studies, and most recently was a senior fellow at the Federation of American Scientists in Washington, D.C.

== Death ==
On July 31, 2011, Tucker was found dead in his home in Washington D.C. He was 56.

== Published works ==
Articles

- Tucker, Jonathan B. (July 1, 1999). "Historical trends related to bioterrorism: An empirical analysis". Emerging Infectious Diseases. 5 (4). Centers for Disease Control and Prevention: 498–504. doi:10.3201/eid0504.990406. PMC 2627752. PMID 10458952.

Books

- Ellie – A Child's Fight Against Leukemia. Henry Holt & Co. 1982. ISBN 978-0-03-057662-1.
- Toxic Terror: Assessing Terrorist Use of Chemical and Biological Weapons. MIT Press. 2000. ISBN 978-0-262-70071-9. (editor)
- Scourge: The Once and Future Threat of Smallpox. Grove Press. 2002. ISBN 978-0-8021-3939-9.
- War of Nerves: Chemical Warfare from World War I to Al-qaeda. Pantheon Books. 2006. ISBN 978-0-375-42229-4.
