= Schedule 1 of the Chemical Weapons Convention =

Schedule 1 substances, in the sense of the Chemical Weapons Convention, are chemicals which are feasible either to be used directly as chemical weapons or in the manufacture of chemical weapons, and which have very limited to no use outside of chemical warfare. These may be produced or used for research, medical, pharmaceutical or chemical weapon defence testing (called "protective testing" in the treaty) purposes but production above 100 grams per year must be declared to the OPCW in accordance with Part VI of the "Verification Annex". A country is limited to possessing a maximum of one tonne of these materials.

Schedule 1 is divided into Part A substances, which are chemicals that can be used directly as weapons, and Part B which are precursors useful in the manufacture of chemical weapons. Examples are mustard and nerve agents, and substances which are solely used as precursor chemicals in their manufacture. A few of these chemicals have very small-scale non-military applications; for example, minute quantities of nitrogen mustard are used to treat certain cancers.

The Schedule 1 list is one of three lists. Chemicals which are feasible to use as weapons, and their precursors, but which have legitimate applications as well are listed in Schedule 2 (small-scale applications) and Schedule 3 (large-scale applications). The use of Schedule 1, 2, or 3 chemicals as weapons is banned by the Convention.

== Guidelines for Schedule 1 ==
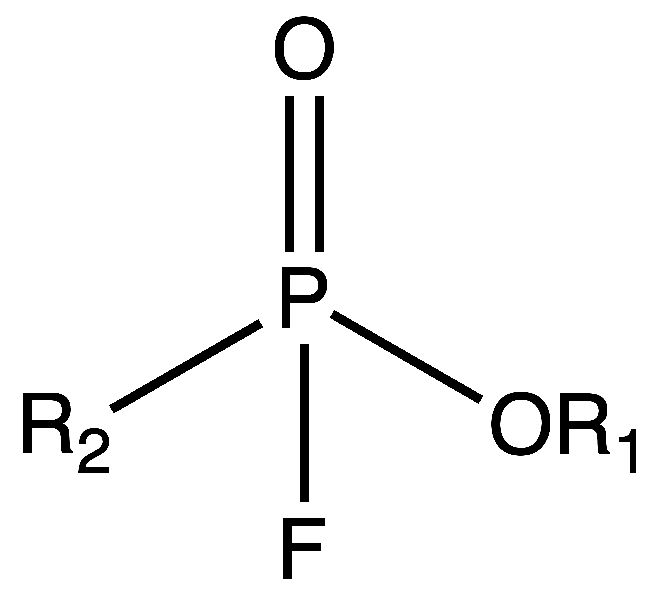
Schedule 1 phosphonofluoridates; where R1 = (cyclo)alkyl with C < C_{10} and R2 = Me, Et, i-Pr or n-Pr.

The following criteria shall be taken into account in considering whether a toxic chemical or precursor should be included in Schedule 1:

- It has been developed, produced, stockpiled or used as a chemical weapon as defined in Article II;
- It poses otherwise a high risk to the object and purpose of this Convention by virtue of its high potential for use in activities prohibited under this Convention because one or more of the following conditions are met:
  - It possesses a chemical structure closely related to that of other toxic chemicals listed in Schedule 1, and has, or can be expected to have, comparable properties;
  - It possesses such lethal or incapacitating toxicity as well as other properties that would enable it to be used as a chemical weapon;
  - It may be used as a precursor in the final single technological stage of production of a toxic chemical listed in Schedule 1, regardless of whether this stage takes place in facilities, in munitions or elsewhere;
- It has little or no use for purposes not prohibited under this Convention.

== Toxic chemicals ==
- O-Alkyl (<C_{10}, incl. cycloalkyl) alkyl (Me, Et, n-Pr or i-Pr)-phosphonofluoridates, e.g.

Sarin: O-Isopropyl methylphosphonofluoridate
Soman: O-Pinacolyl methylphosphonofluoridate

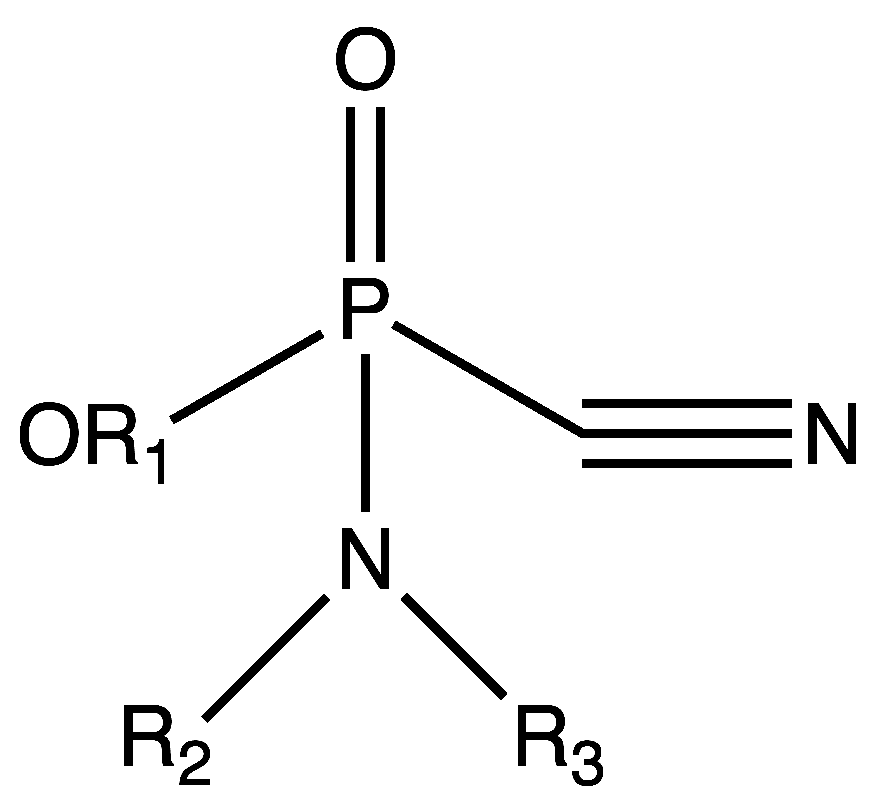
Schedule 1 phosphoramidocyanidates; where R1 = (cyclo)alkyl with C<C_{10} and R2/R3 = Me, Et, i-Pr or n-Pr.

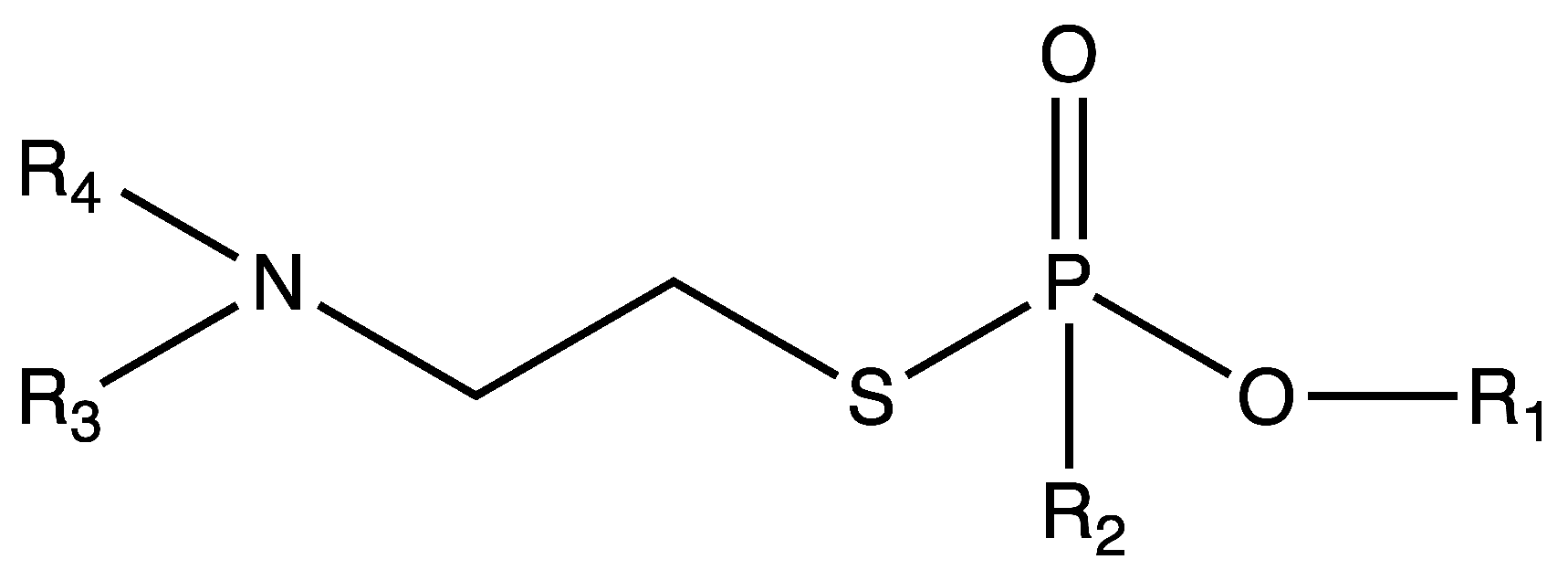
Schedule 1 Phosphonothiolate; where R1 = H or (cyclo)alkyl with C<C_{10} and R2/R3/R4 = Me, Et, i-Pr or n-Pr.

- O-Alkyl (<C_{10}, incl. cycloalkyl) N,N-dialkyl (Me, Et, n-Pr or i-Pr) phosphoramidocyanidates, e.g.

Tabun: O-Ethyl N,N-dimethylphosphoramidocyanidate

- O-Alkyl (H or <C_{10}, incl. cycloalkyl) S-2-dialkyl (Me, Et, n-Pr or i-Pr)-aminoethyl alkyl (Me, Et, n-Pr or i-Pr) phosphonothiolates and corresponding alkylated or protonated salts, e.g.

VX: O-Ethyl S-2-diisopropylaminoethyl methylphosphonothiolate

- Sulfur mustards:

2-Chloroethylchloromethylsulfide
Mustard gas: Bis(2-chloroethyl)sulfide
Bis(2-chloroethylthio)methane
Sesquimustard: 1,2-Bis(2-chloroethylthio)ethane
1,3-Bis(2-chloroethylthio)-n-propane
1,4-Bis(2-chloroethylthio)-n-butane
1,5-Bis(2-chloroethylthio)-n-pentane
Bis(2-chloroethylthiomethyl)ether
O-Mustard: Bis(2-chloroethylthioethyl)ether

- Lewisites:

Lewisite 1: 2-Chlorovinyldichloroarsine
Lewisite 2: Bis(2-chlorovinyl)chloroarsine
Lewisite 3: Tris(2-chlorovinyl)arsine

- Nitrogen mustards:

HN1: Bis(2-chloroethyl)ethylamine
HN2: Bis(2-chloroethyl)methylamine
HN3: Tris(2-chloroethyl)amine

- Saxitoxin
- Ricin
- Novichok agents: Р-alkyl (H or ≤C_{10}, incl. cycloalkyl) N-(1-(dialkyl(≤C10, incl. cycloalkyl)amino))alkylidene(H or ≤C_{10}, incl. cycloalkyl) phosphonamidic fluorides and corresponding alkylated or protonated salts

e.g. N-(1-(di-n-decylamino)-n-decylidene)-P-decylphosphonamidic fluoride
Methyl-(1-(diethylamino)ethylidene)phosphonamidofluoridate, also known as A-230

- Novichok agents: O-alkyl (H or ≤C_{10}, incl. cycloalkyl) N-(1-(dialkyl(≤C10, incl. cycloalkyl)amino))alkylidene(H or ≤C_{10}, incl. cycloalkyl) phosphoramidofluoridates and corresponding alkylated or protonated salts, e.g.

O-n-Decyl N-(1-(di-n-decylamino)-n-decylidene)phosphoramidofluoridate
Methyl (1-(diethylamino)ethylidene)phosphoramidofluoridate, also known as A-232
Ethyl (1-(diethylamino)ethylidene)phosphoramidofluoridate, also known as A-234.

- Novichok agents: Methyl-(bis(diethylamino)methylene)phosphonamidofluoridate
- Carbamates (quaternaries and bisquaternaries of dimethylcarbamoyloxypyridines) Quaternaries of dimethylcarbamoyloxypyridines:

1-[N,N-dialkyl(≤C_{10})-N-(n-(hydroxyl, cyano, acetoxy)alkyl(≤C_{10})) ammonio]-n-[N-(3-dimethylcarbamoxy-α-picolinyl)-N,N-dialkyl(≤C_{10}) ammonio]decane dibromide (n=1-8)
e.g. 1-[N,N-dimethyl-N-(2-hydroxy)ethylammonio]-10-[N-(3-dimethylcarbamoxy-αpicolinyl)-N,N-dimethylammonio]decane dibromide

- Bisquaternaries of dimethylcarbamoyloxypyridines: 1,n-Bis[N-(3-dimethylcarbamoxy-α-picolyl)-N,N-dialkyl(≤C_{10}) ammonio]-alkane-(2,(n-1)-dione) dibromide (n=2-12)

e.g. 1,10-Bis[N-(3-dimethylcarbamoxy-α-picolyl)-N-ethyl-N-methylammonio]decane-2,9-dione dibromide

== Precursors ==
Schedule 1 alkyl phosphonyldifluorides; where R1 = Me, Et, i-Pr or n-Pr.

- Alkyl (Me, Et, n-Pr or i-Pr) phosphonyldifluorides, e.g.

DF: Methylphosphonyl difluoride

- O-Alkyl (H or <C_{10}, incl. cycloalkyl) O-2-dialkyl (Me, Et, n-Pr or i-Pr)-aminoethyl alkyl (Me, Et, n-Pr or i-Pr) phosphonites and corresponding alkylated or protonated salts, e.g.

QL: O-Ethyl O-2-diisopropylaminoethyl methylphosphonite

- Chlorosarin: O-Isopropyl methylphosphonochloridate
- Chlorosoman: O-Pinacolyl methylphosphonochloridate

== See also ==
- Schedule 2
- Schedule 3
