= GosNIIOKhT =

Russian research institute

Coordinates: 55°45′16″N 37°43′46″E

GosNIIOKhT State Research Institute of Organic Chemistry and Technology
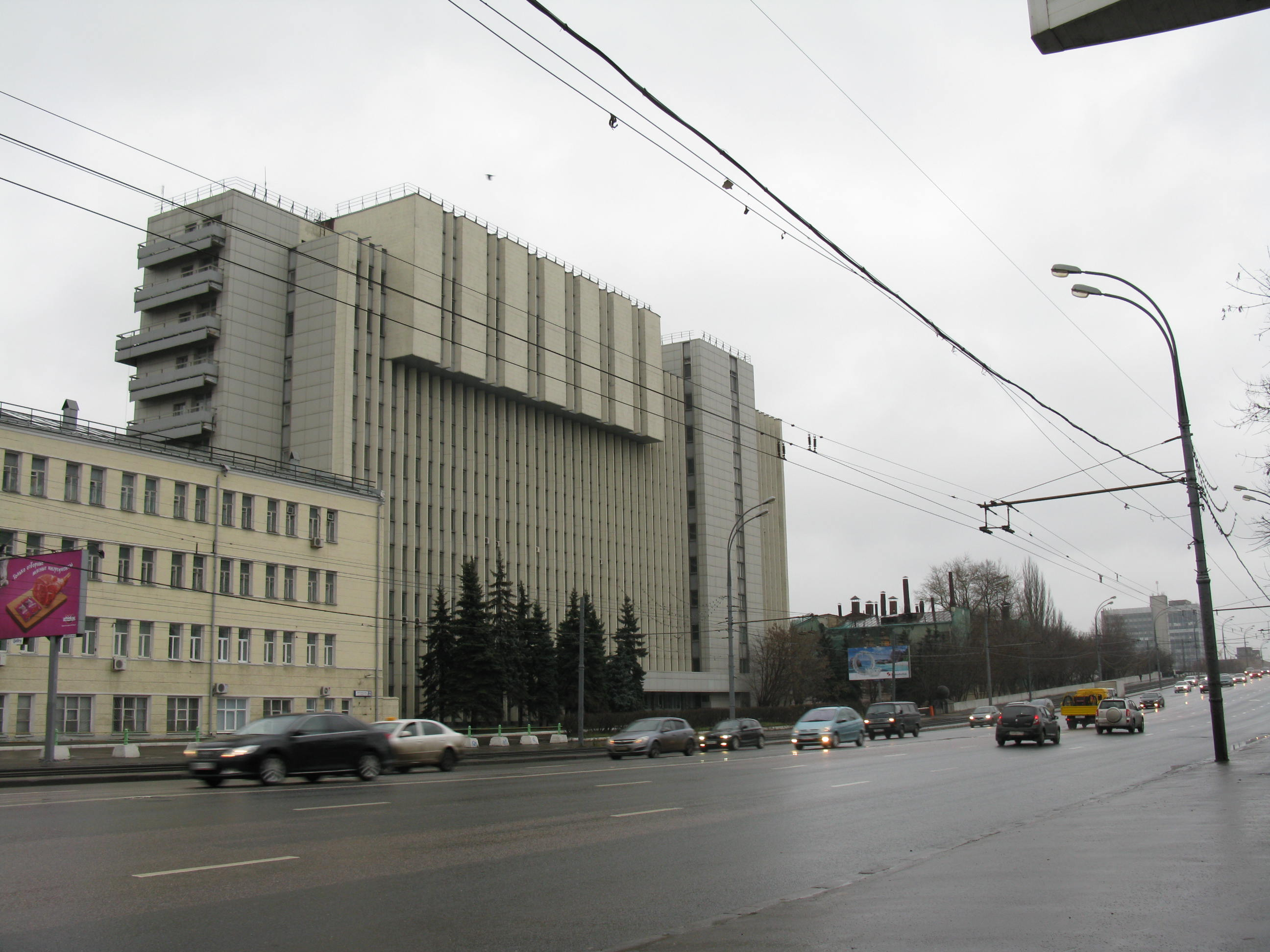
- Management building
- Parent institution: Ministry of Industry and Trade (Russia)
- Founder: Soviet Union
- Established: January 10, 1924; 102 years ago
- Formerly called: Research Institute No. 42
- Address: Shosse Entuziastov, 23
- Location: Moscow
- Website: gosniiokht.ru

The State Research Institute of Organic Chemistry and Technology (Russian: Государственный научно-исследовательский институт органической химии и технологии, romanized: Gosudarstvennyy nauchno-issledovatel'skiy institut organicheskoy khimii i tekhnologii, GosNIIOKhT) is a Russian research institute engaged in the development of chemical technologies for use in the national economy and the production of relevant goods and products.

During the Cold War, the institute participated in the development of chemical weapons for the Soviet Union, notably the Novichok family of nerve agents, one of the most lethal nerve agent families.

== History ==
GosNIIOKhT was founded in 1924, during the time of the Soviet Union, to conduct research work in organic synthesis and to be for the Soviet state the umbrella organization for it, below which were arrayed a number of satellite institutes.

From the early 1930s, the research institute was engaged in the development of chemical weapons. Significant numbers of scientists were also assigned to develop anti-crop and anti-animal agents.

Between 1971 and 1993, GosNIIOKhT conducted research and synthesis of the Novichok family of nerve agents.

GosNIIOKhT employed approximately 6,000 people by the dissolution of the Soviet Union. The employees worked in Novocheboksarsk on nerve agent production, in Volgograd on nerve agent production, in Dzerzinsk on blister agent production, in Shikhany on testing, and in Nukus, Uzbekistan on testing.

The Yeltsin government alarmed the international community by stating that it could not afford to keep the GosNIIOKhT facilities open or personnel employed, as that would mean starving scientists would have incentive to work for nefarious organizations.

By December 1999 the International Science and Technology Center had borne small fruit. In the opinion of one writer, "permitting the ISTC and the other grant programs to sponsor projects that work with Western commercial companies to retool some equipment and kick off the manufacturing of consumer products at these facilities. An advantage to lifting the congressional ban on defense conversion is that the Western commercial partners would have a frequent presence on site—an arrangement likely to foil efforts to produce warfare agents covertly at these facilities. Such an outcome is far preferable to allowing the skilled labor at these facilities to become increasingly destitute and even desperate... Entire segments of poison gas experts have no contact with the [ISTC] grant programs, especially those within the design bureaus that have specialized skills in the aerosolization of agents and their weaponization."

Currently, its activities include the production of chemical weapons and other hazardous materials. Other areas of work include the development and production of drugs, toxicological research, preclinical testing, chemical technology, and environmental safety.

=== The Navalny affair ===
On 15 October 2020, European Union sanctions were imposed on the institute in connection with the alleged poisoning of politician Alexei Navalny. The Council of the European Union's grounds for designation states

The State Scientific Research Institute for Organic Chemistry and Technology (GosNIIOKhT) is a state research institute with the responsibility for the destruction of chemical weapons stocks inherited from the Soviet Union.

The institute in its original role before 1994 was involved in the development and production of chemical weapons including the toxic nerve agent now known as “Novichok”. After 1994, the same facility took part in the government’s programme for the destruction of the stocks of chemical weapons inherited from the Soviet Union.

On 20 August 2020, Alexei Navalny was taken seriously ill and admitted to a hospital in Omsk, Russian Federation. On 22 August 2020, he was transported to a hospital in Berlin, Germany. A specialised laboratory in Germany subsequently found clear evidence, also corroborated by laboratories in France and Sweden, that Alexei Navalny had been poisoned with a toxic nerve agent of the Novichok group. This toxic agent is accessible only to State authorities in the Russian Federation.

The deployment of a toxic nerve agent of the Novichok group would therefore only be possible due to the failure of the institute to carry out its responsibility to destroy the stockpiles of chemical weapons.

— Council Decision (CFSP) 2020/1482 of 14 October 2020 amending Decision (CFSP) 2018/1544 concerning restrictive measures against the proliferation and use of chemical weapons

=== US sanctions ===
On 21 March 2021, invoking its authorities under the Countering America’s Adversaries Through Sanctions Act (CAATSA) Section 231, the United States Department of State added GosNIIOKhT to its List of Specified Persons as persons that are part of, or operate for or on behalf of, the defense or intelligence sectors of the Government of the Russian Federation. The Department describes GosNIIOKhT as "a Russian institute with a longstanding role in researching and developing chemical weapons, and GosNIIOKhT developed Russia's Novichok chemical weapons. Since 2016, GosNIIOKhT has expanded its research, development, testing, and evaluation capabilities."

In addition, GosNIIOKhT was designated under the authority of the International Emergency Economic Powers Act and Executive Order 13382, "Blocking Property of Weapons of Mass Destruction Proliferators and Their Supporters."
