= C01-A039 =

Names
- Preferred IUPAC name N-[(Ethoxyphosphorofluoridoyl)oxy]carbonimidic dichloride

Identifiers
CAS Number	17642-32-9
3D model (JSmol)	Interactive image
ChemSpider	95563999
PubChem CID	154735206
CompTox Dashboard (EPA)	DTXSID001020097
- InChI: InChI=1S/C3H5Cl2FNO3P/c1-2-9-11(6,8)10-7-3(4)5/h2H2,1H3 Key: WOEPLYQVCCCPLQ-UHFFFAOYSA-N
- SMILES: CCOP(=O)(ON=C(Cl)Cl)F

Properties
Chemical formula	C_{3}H_{5}Cl_{2}FNO_{3}P
Molar mass	223.95 g·mol^{−1}
Density	1.366 g/mL
Boiling point	87 °C (189 °F; 360 K) at 4 mmHg
- Except where otherwise noted, data are given for materials in their standard state (at 25 °C [77 °F], 100 kPa). Infobox references

C01-A039 is a Novichok agent. It is the ethyl phosphorofluoridate ester of phosgene oxime.

== See also ==
- C01-A035
