= Vil Mirzayanov =

Russian chemist of ethnic Tatar origin (born 1935)

Vil Sultanovich Mirzayanov (Russian: Вил Султанович Мирзаянов, Tatar: Вил Солтан улы Мирзаҗанов) is a Russian chemist of ethnic Tatar origin who now lives in the United States, best known for revealing secret chemical weapons experimentation in Russia.

== Early life ==
Vil Sultanovich Mirzayanov was born in a village in rural Bashkortostan, the son of the village school teacher. The Mirzayanov family is Tatar, a Turkic ethnic minority in Russia. His father, a staunch Communist, broke with a 200 year old family tradition in which the oldest sons entered the Muslim clergy. In 1953, he graduated from the Dyurtyuli Tatar School No. 1 with a silver medal.

== Career ==
Mirzayanov was employed by the State Research Institute of Organic Chemistry and Technology. He was then assigned to a secret military chemical weapons laboratory, GosNIIOKhT (Russian: ГосНИИОХТ) situated in Shikhany, which was developing the Novichok agent programme of nerve agents. He was head of a counter-intelligence department that performed measurements outside the chemical weapons facilities to make sure that foreign spies could not detect any traces of production. To his horror, the levels of deadly substances were 80 times greater than the maximum safe concentration. (A full account by Mirzayanov is available online.)

Concerned mostly with environmental contamination, Mirzayanov and his colleague Lev Fyodorov decided to reveal the extent of chemical weapons experimentation in Russia, which Russia used as a workaround to comply with the proposed 1990 Chemical Weapons Accord and the existing Wyoming Memorandum of Understanding but still produce chemical-like weapons. In 1992, they published an article about the USSR and Russia's development of extremely potent fourth-generation chemical weapons from the 1970s until the early 1990s, in Moskovskiye Novosti weekly, and for safety purposes in the Baltimore Sun through an associated article written by veteran correspondent Will Englund. The publication appeared just on the eve of Russia's signing of the 1990 Chemical Weapons Convention. Later according to Mirzayanov, the Russian Military Chemical Complex (MCC) was using defense conversion money received from the West for development of the chemical warfare facility.

== Exposing Russian secrets ==
Mirzayanov was arrested on October 22, 1992, on charges of treason, brought by the Russian military industrial complex authorities — he was not allowed to know the exact charges, as they were also declared a state secret. Held in Lefortovo Prison, during the resultant court case, the existence of Novichok agents was openly admitted by Russian authorities. According to expert witness testimonies prepared for the KGB by three scientists, Novichok and other related chemical agents had indeed been produced and therefore the disclosure by Mirzayanov represented high treason.

However, the trial collapsed. Mirzayanov was released because "not one of the formulas or names of poisonous substances in the Moscow News article was new to the Soviet press, nor were locations ... of testing sites revealed." According to Yevgenia Albats, "the real state secret revealed by Fyodorov and Mirzayanov was that generals had lied — and were still lying — to both the international community and their fellow citizens."

Mirzayanov was released, but kept under house arrest and observation. In 1995, he relocated to the United States where he presently resides, taking a position at Rutgers University in New Jersey.

On October 26, 2008, Mirzayanov was elected to the Presidium of the Milli Mejlis of the Tatar People in exile. On January 17, 2009, in an article on CNN, he published the DECLARATION OF INDEPENDENCE OF TATARSTAN, adopted at a Special Meeting of the Milli Mejlis of the Tatar People on December 20, 2008. At a conference on the separation of Tatarstan from Russia, held in Ankara in the same year, Mirzayanov was elected "Prime Minister" of the "government in exile". In March 2010, Mirzayanov signed the "Putin Must Go" campaign.

In March 2018, after the poisoning of Sergei and Yulia Skripal, Mirzayanov spoke about how Russia maintained tight control over its Novichok stockpile and that the agent is too complicated for a non-state actor to have weaponized. "It's torture. It's absolutely incurable." "I never imagined even in my bad dreams that this chemical weapon, developed with my participation, would be used as terrorist weapons." Both victims later recovered and left the hospital. Mirzayanov said only the Russians can be behind the weapon's use in the poisoning and said he was convinced Russia carried it out as a way of intimidating opponents of President Vladimir Putin. He added that the Russians could argue that maybe someone had synthesized them "and they could make me guilty!"

== See also ==
- Lev Alexandrovich Fyodorov
