= C01-A035 =

Names
- IUPAC name [(Fluoromethoxyphosphinyl)oxy]carbonimidic dichloride

Identifiers
CAS Number	17642-31-8
3D model (JSmol)	Interactive image
ChemSpider	95710859
PubChem CID	154735205
CompTox Dashboard (EPA)	DTXSID301020096
- InChI: InChI=1S/C2H3Cl2FNO3P/c1-8-10(5,7)9-6-2(3)4/h1H3 Key: MTRLLLLSFQABEH-UHFFFAOYSA-N
- SMILES: COP(=O)(ON=C(Cl)Cl)F

Properties
Chemical formula	C_{2}H_{3}Cl_{2}FNO_{3}P
Molar mass	209.92 g·mol^{−1}
Density	1.488 g/mL
Boiling point	57 °C (135 °F; 330 K) at 2 mmHg
- Except where otherwise noted, data are given for materials in their standard state (at 25 °C [77 °F], 100 kPa). Infobox references

C01-A035 is a Novichok agent. It is the methyl phosphorofluoridate ester of phosgene oxime.

== See also ==
- C01-A039
