= Muharrem (name) =

Muharrem, Muharem, Muharam, Moharam or Muharram is a common Arabic and Turkish language masculine given name. People with the name include:

== Given name ==
=== Muharram/Moharam/Moharram ===
- Muharram (1968–2020), Indonesian politician
- Moharam Asheri (born 1959), Iranian footballer
- Muharram Fouad (1934–2002), Egyptian singer and actor
- Moharam Khan Nasiri, Afghan politician
- Moharram Navidkia (born 1982), Iranian footballer and coach
- Muharram Rasulova (1926–2006), Tajikistani botanist

=== Muharrem/Muharem ===
- Muharrem Bajraktari (1896–1989), Albanian guerilla warrior and politician
- Muharem Bajrami (born 1985), Macedonian footballer
- Muharem Bazdulj (born 1977), Bosnian-Serbian writer and journalist
- Muharrem Blakçori (1894–1968), Albanian author and activist
- Muharrem Candaş (1921–2009), Turkish wrestler
- Muharrem Dalkılıç (born 1938), Turkish runner
- Muharrem Demirok (born 1976), Swedish politician
- Muharrem Ertaş (1913–1984), Turkish folk singer and instrumentalist
- Muharrem Fejzo (1933–2020), Albanian directed
- Muharrem Hasani (born 1985), Swiss kickboxer
- Muharem Husković (born 2003), Austrian footballer
- Muharrem İnce (born 1964), Turkish politician, teacher and sports executive
- Muharrem Jashari (born 1998), Kosovan footballer
- Muharrem Karriqi, Albanian footballer
- Muharrem Korhan Yamaç (born 1972), Turkish Paralympic shooter
- Muharrem Köse, Turkish army officer
- Muharem Kurbegovic (born 1943), Yugoslav-American aerospace engineer and domestic terrorist
- Muharrem Qena (1930–2006), Kosovar Albanian actor, filmmaker, writer and singer
- Muharrem Sahiti (born 1965), Kosovan footballer and coach
- Muharem Serbezovski (born 1950), Bosnian singer and songwriter
- Muharrem Shabani (born 1949), Kosovan politician
- Muharrem Süleymanoğlu (born 1969), Turkish weightlifter
- Muharem Trako (born 2003), Bosnian footballer
- Muharrem Uz (born 1980), Turkish footballer
- Muharrem Varlı (born 1969), Turkish politician

== Middle name and surname ==
- Ahmed Moharram (1913–2017), Egyptian engineer
- Ashwaq Moharram (born 1974/1975), Yemeni doctor and activist
- Ghozali Muharam Siregar (born 1992), Indonesian footballer
- Ruslan Muharam (born 1962), Malaysian politician
- Shuayb Muharrem Arnauti (1928–2016), Syrian-Albanian Islamic scholar
