= Nasiri =

Nasiri may refer to:

- Ahmad ibn Khalid al-Nasiri, Moroccan writer
- Marall Nasiri, Swedish actress
- Mohamed Ali al-Nasiri, Iraqi journalist
- Mohammed al-Makki al-Nasiri, Moroccan writer
- Moharam Khan Nasiri, member of the Meshrano Jirga
- The Nasiri dynasty
- Omar Nasiri, Moroccan spy
- Mohammad Nassiri, Iranian weightlifter, 1968 Olympic champion, world, Asian and Asian games champion.
- Al-bu Nasir, Iraqi Arab tribe of which Saddam Hussein is a member.

== See also ==
- Naciri, a surname
