= History of chemical warfare =

History of chemical weapons in war

Gassed, historic 1919 painting by John Singer Sargent depicting the aftermath of a mustard gas attack. Chemical weapons were first used on a vast scale in World War I.

The history of chemical warfare dates from antiquity. Chemical weapons have been a part of warfare in most societies for centuries. However, their usage has been extremely controversial since the 20th century.

Chemical warfare is recorded in the ancient periods of Greece, Rome, Carthage, India, China, and South Africa. Soldiers poisoned arrows, water supplies, or dispersed toxic smokes.

Chemical weapons were first used on a large scale by most major powers in World War I, employing the gases mustard, phosgene, and chlorine, and others, causing lung scarring, blindness, and death. During World War II, Nazi Germany used a commercial hydrogen cyanide blood agent named Zyklon B to commit industrialised genocide against Jews and other populations in gas chambers. The Holocaust resulted in the largest death toll due to chemical weapons in history. The Empire of Japan also used chemical warfare in China during the Second Sino-Japanese War, including mustard gas and lewisite.

Nazi Germany discovered nerve agents during the war, but did not use them for fear of Allied retaliation. In the Cold War, many countries stockpiled chemical weapons. The Soviet and United States chemical weapons programs became the first and second largest in world history, focusing on sarin, VX/VR, and mustard, primarily for battlefield use in Europe. The use of chemical weapons in the Iran–Iraq War and in the Syrian civil war saw thousands killed by nerve agents and blister agents.

At the end of the Cold War, the 1993 Chemical Weapons Convention sought a legally binding, worldwide ban on the production, stockpiling, and use of chemical weapons and their precursors. Large-scale stockpile destruction efforts followed, with the US eliminating its arsenal by 2023. As of 2025 the treaty has 193 state parties; Syria and Russia are widely believed to have violated its prohibitions on stockpiling and use while Israel and North Korea remain non-parties. Small research quantities are treaty-permitted as part of CBRN defense.

== Ancient and medieval times ==
Ancient Greek myths about Heracles poisoning his arrows with the venom of the Hydra monster are the earliest references to toxic weapons in western literature. Homer's epics, the Iliad and the Odyssey, allude to poisoned arrows used by both sides in the legendary Trojan War (Bronze Age Greece).

Some of the earliest surviving references to toxic warfare appear in the Indian epics Ramayana and Mahabharata. The "Laws of Manu," a Hindu treatise on statecraft (c. 400 BC) forbids the use of poison and fire arrows, but advises poisoning food and water. Kautilya's "Arthashastra", a statecraft manual of the same era, contains hundreds of recipes for creating poison weapons, toxic smokes, and other chemical weapons. Ancient Greek historians recount that Alexander the Great encountered poison arrows and fire incendiaries in India at the Indus basin in the 4th century BC.

The earliest recorded use of gas warfare in the West dates back to the fifth century BC, during the Peloponnesian War between Athens and Sparta. Spartan forces besieging an Athenian city placed a lighted mixture of wood, pitch, and sulfur under the walls hoping that the noxious smoke would incapacitate the Athenians, so that they would not be able to resist the assault that followed. Sparta was not alone in its use of unconventional tactics in ancient Greece; Solon of Athens is said to have used hellebore roots to poison the water in an aqueduct leading from the River Pleistos around 590 BC during the siege of Kirrha.

The earliest archaeological evidence of gas warfare is during the Roman–Persian wars. Research carried out on the collapsed tunnels at Dura-Europos in Syria suggests that during the siege of the town in the third century AD, the Sasanians used bitumen and sulfur crystals to get it burning. When ignited, the materials gave off dense clouds of choking sulfur dioxide gases which killed 19 Roman soldiers and a single Sassanian, purported to be the fire-tender, in a matter of two minutes.

Quicklime may have been used in medieval naval warfare, including to use of "lime-mortars" to throw it at enemy ships. Scottish historian David Hume, in his work The History of England, recounted how during the reign of Henry III of England the English navy destroyed an invading French fleet by attacking it with quicklime.

=== China ===
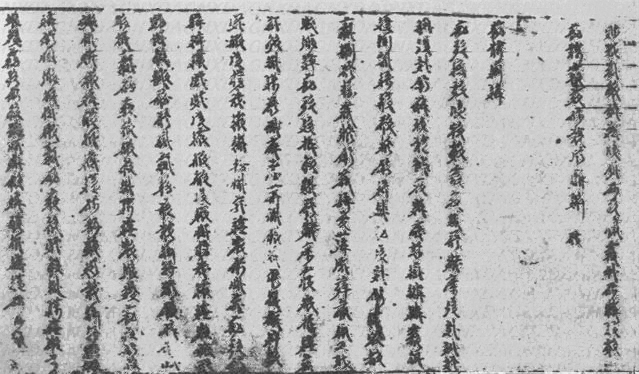
The Art of War described the use of fire weapons against the enemy.

Chinese writings from 1000 BCE contain recipes for the production of poisonous or irritating smokes for use in war along with numerous accounts of their use. These accounts describe an arsenic-containing "soul-hunting fog." Literary sources of Chinese history mention that in 559 BCE the predynastic Qin state poisoned the Jing River, poisoning men and horses and forcing the retreat of other warring states such as the Jin and Lu. In the second century BC, writings of the Mohist sect in China describe the use of bellows to pump smoke from burning balls of toxic plants and vegetables into tunnels being dug by a besieging army. Chinese writings also describe the use of finely divided lime dispersed into the air to suppress a peasant revolt in 178 AD.

Various Chinese sources from eleventh to seventeenth centuries describe mixtures of "poison gunpowder" suitable for creating grenades or trebuchet-launched bombs. This has included arsenic and crotonaldehyde, and is described in the Huolongjing and Tiangong Kaiwu.

=== Americas ===
In the late 15th century, Spanish conquistadors encountered chemical warfare on the island of Hispaniola when Taíno threw gourds filled with ashes and ground hot peppers at the Spaniards to create a blinding smoke screen before launching their attack.

The people of Pernambuco province used pepper smoke during sieges; they would wait till the wind was blowing towards the enemy, and light a bonfire filled with peppers.

== Early modern era ==
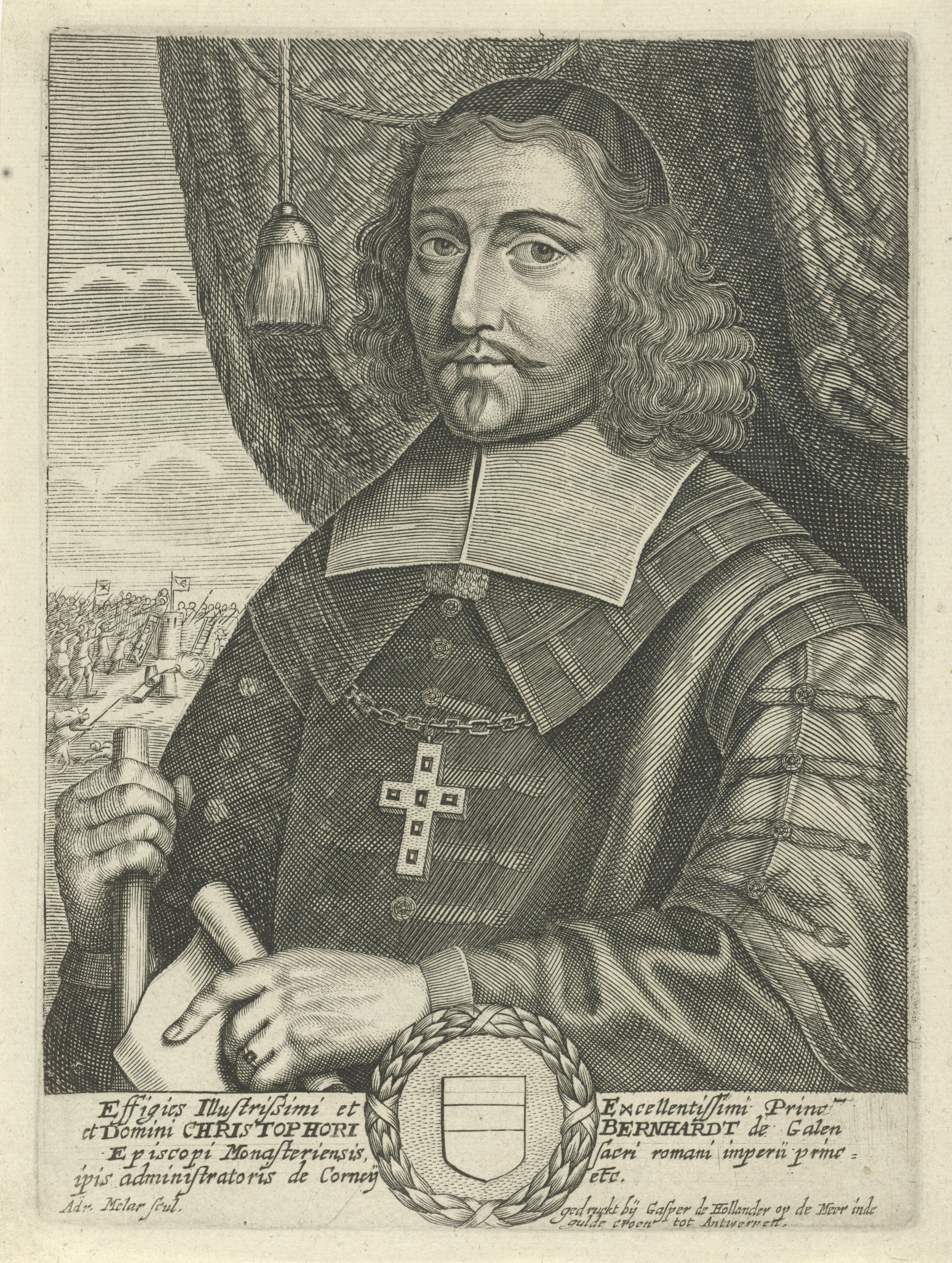
Christoph Bernhard von Galen tried to use toxic fumes during the siege of the city of Groningen in 1672.

Leonardo da Vinci proposed the use of a powder of sulfide, arsenic and verdigris in the 15th century:

throw poison in the form of powder upon galleys. Chalk, fine sulfide of arsenic, and powdered verdegris may be thrown among enemy ships by means of small mangonels, and all those who, as they breathe, inhale the powder into their lungs will become asphyxiated.

It is unknown whether this powder was ever actually used.

In the 17th century during sieges, armies attempted to start fires by launching incendiary shells filled with sulfur, tallow, rosin, turpentine, saltpeter, and/or antimony. Even when fires were not started, the resulting smoke and fumes provided a considerable distraction. Although their primary function was never abandoned, a variety of fills for shells were developed to maximize the effects of the smoke.

In 1672, during his siege of the city of Groningen, Christoph Bernhard von Galen, the Bishop of Münster, employed several different explosive and incendiary devices, some of which had a fill that included belladonna, intended to produce toxic fumes. Just three years later, August 27, 1675, the French and the Holy Roman Empire concluded the Strasbourg Agreement, which included an article banning the use of "perfidious and odious" toxic devices.

Pirate Captain Thompson used "vast numbers of powder flasks, grenade shells, and stinkpots" to defeat two pirate-hunters sent by the Governor of Jamaica in 1719.

The Qing dynasty used stinkpots in naval operations. Those earthenware incendiary weapons were in part filled with sulphur, gunpowder, nails, and shot, while the other part was filled with noxious materials designed to emanate a highly unpleasant and suffocating smell to its enemies when ignited. During the War of 1812, the Royal Navy used stinkpots in a bombardment of Stonington, Connecticut on 9 August 1814.

== Industrial era ==
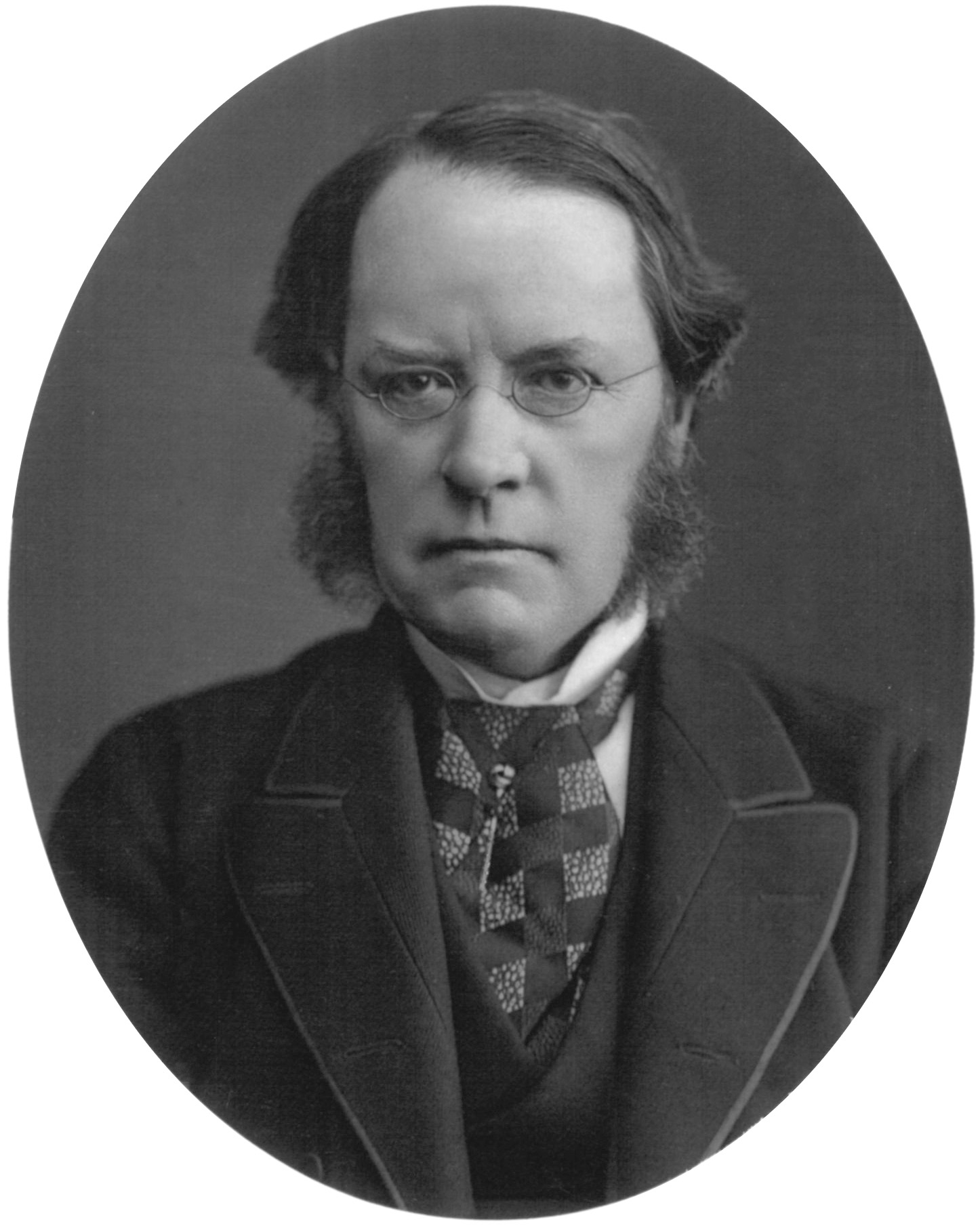
Lyon Playfair proposed the industrial manufacture of cyanide artillery shells for use during the Crimean War.

The modern notion of chemical warfare emerged from the mid-19th century, with the development of modern chemistry and associated industries. The first recorded modern proposal for the use of chemical warfare was made by Lyon Playfair, Secretary of the Science and Art Department, in 1854 during the Crimean War. He proposed a cacodyl cyanide artillery shell for use against enemy ships as way to solve the stalemate during the siege of Sevastopol. The proposal was backed by Admiral Thomas Cochrane of the Royal Navy. It was considered by the Prime Minister, Lord Palmerston, but the British Ordnance Department rejected the proposal as "as bad a mode of warfare as poisoning the wells of the enemy." Playfair's response was used to justify chemical warfare into the next century:

There was no sense in this objection. It is considered a legitimate mode of warfare to fill shells with molten metal which scatters among the enemy, and produced the most frightful modes of death. Why a poisonous vapor which would kill men without suffering is to be considered illegitimate warfare is incomprehensible. War is destruction, and the more destructive it can be made with the least suffering the sooner will be ended that barbarous method of protecting national rights. No doubt in time chemistry will be used to lessen the suffering of combatants, and even of criminals condemned to death.

Later, during the American Civil War, New York school teacher John Doughty proposed the offensive use of chlorine gas, delivered by filling a 10-inch (254 millimeter) artillery shell with two to three quarts (1.89–2.84 liters) of liquid chlorine, which could produce many cubic feet of chlorine gas. Doughty's plan was apparently never acted on, as it was probably presented to Brigadier General James Wolfe Ripley, Chief of Ordnance.

In March 1868, during the War of Triple Alliance, the Paraguayan troops threw lit tubes full of asphixiating mixtures in their attempt to board Brazilian ironclads with canoes. The attack failed since the tubes were easily put out by the defenders.

In June 1898, during the Spanish–American War, Spanish inventors Manuel Daza and Antonio Meulener tested the tóxpiro or tóspiro, a chemical artillery grenade of unknown composition. They fired it from the battleship Pelayo against a barge loaded with eight farm animals, killing all of them without damaging the barge. Despite this, the Spanish government was not interested.

A general concern over the use of poison gas manifested itself in 1899 at the Hague Conference with a proposal prohibiting shells filled with asphyxiating gas. The proposal was passed, despite a single dissenting vote from the United States. The American representative, Navy Captain Alfred Thayer Mahan, justified voting against the measure on the grounds that "the inventiveness of Americans should not be restricted in the development of new weapons."

== World War I ==
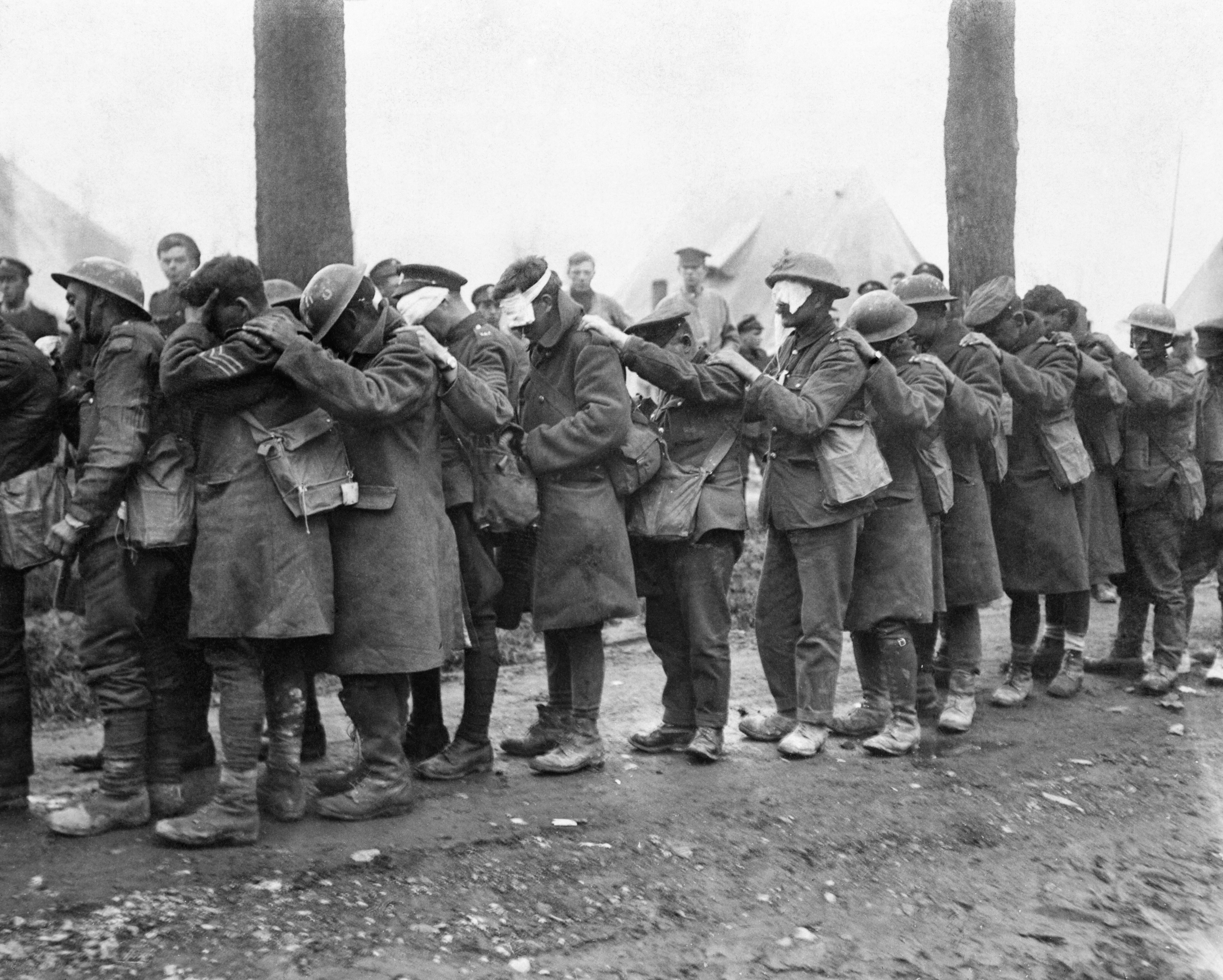
Gas casualties from the Battle of Estaires, April 10, 1918

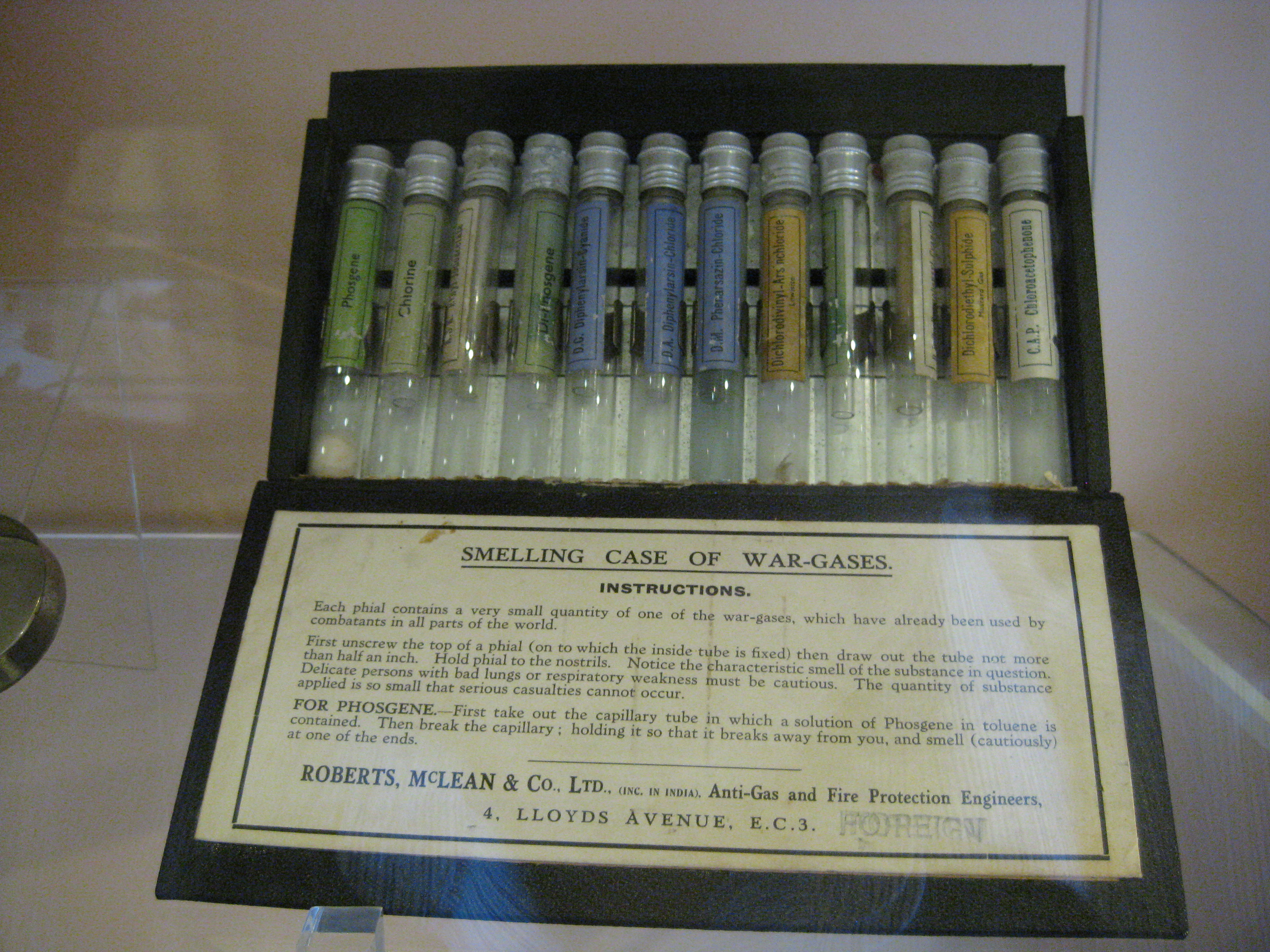
A Smelling Case to allow officers to identify the gas by smell and thus act appropriately for protection and treatment

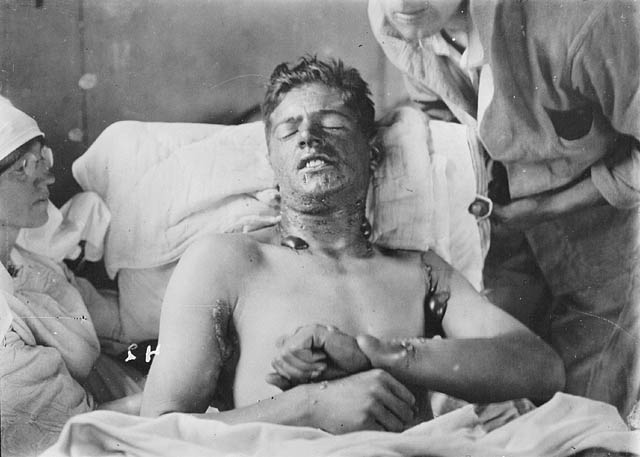
A Canadian soldier with mustard gas burns, c. 1917–1918

The French were the first to use chemical weapons during the First World War, using the tear gases ethyl bromoacetate and chloroacetone. They likely did not realize that effects might be more serious under wartime conditions than in riot control. It is also likely that their use of tear gas escalated to the use of poisonous gases.

The Hague Declaration of 1899 and the Hague Convention of 1907 prohibit the firing of any projectiles "the sole object of which is the diffusion of asphyxiating or deleterious gases." Germany exploited this loophole by opening canisters filled with poison gas into the wind and letting it carry it towards the enemy lines, instead of launching it in artillery rounds. One of Germany's earliest uses of chemical weapons occurred on October 27, 1914, when shells containing the irritant dianisidine chlorosulfonate were fired at British troops near Neuve-Chapelle, France. Germany used another irritant, xylyl bromide, in artillery shells that were fired in January 1915 at the Russians near Bolimów, in present-day Poland. The first full-scale deployment of deadly chemical warfare agents during World War I was at the Second Battle of Ypres, on April 22, 1915, when the Germans attacked French, Canadian and Algerian troops with chlorine gas released from canisters and carried by the wind towards the Allied trenches.

A total 50,965 tons of pulmonary, lachrymatory, and vesicant agents were deployed by both sides of the conflict, including chlorine, phosgene, and mustard gas. Historians have reached a wide range of estimates on gas casualties, ranging from 500,000 to 1.3 million casualties directly caused by chemical warfare agents during the course of the war. A minimum of around 1,300 civilians were injured due to the use of the weapons, and at least around 4,000 were injured during weapon production.

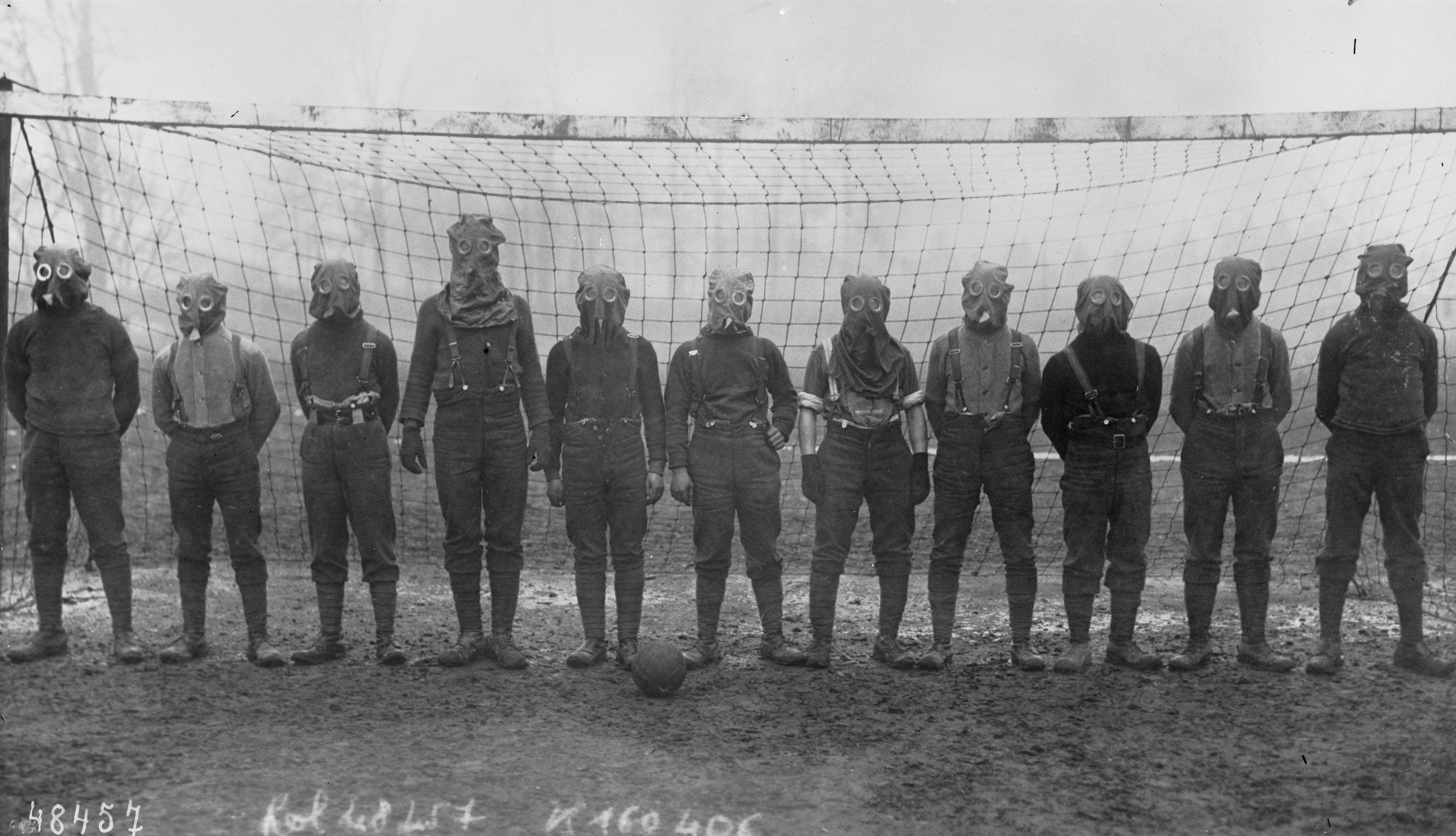
Football team of British soldiers with gas masks, Western Front, 1916

World War I-era chemical ammunition is still found, unexploded, at former battle, storage, or test sites and poses an ongoing threat to inhabitants of Belgium, France and other countries. Camp American University where American chemical weapons were developed and later buried, has undergone 20 years of remediation efforts.

After the war, the most common method of disposal of chemical weapons was to dump them into the nearest large body of water. As many as 65,000 tons of chemical warfare agents may have been dumped in the Baltic Sea alone; agents dumped in that sea included mustard gas, phosgene, lewisite (β-chlorovinyldichloroarsine), adamsite (diphenylaminechloroarsine), Clark I (diphenylchloroarsine) and Clark II (diphenylcyanoarsine). Over time the containers corrode, and the chemicals leaked out. On the sea floor, at low temperatures, mustard gas tends to form lumps within a "skin" of chemical byproducts. These lumps can wash onto shore, where they look like chunks of waxy yellowish clay. They are extremely toxic, but the effects may not be immediately apparent.

== Interwar period ==
During the interwar period, chemical agents were occasionally used to subdue populations and suppress rebellion. In 1925, 16 of the world's major nations signed the Geneva Protocol, thereby pledging never to use chemical weapons in interstate warfare again. Notably, while the United States delegation under presidential authority signed the Protocol, it was not ratified until 1975. The Protocol does not ban the development or production of chemical weapons nor does it cover their use in non-international armed conflicts.

=== Northern Russia intervention ===
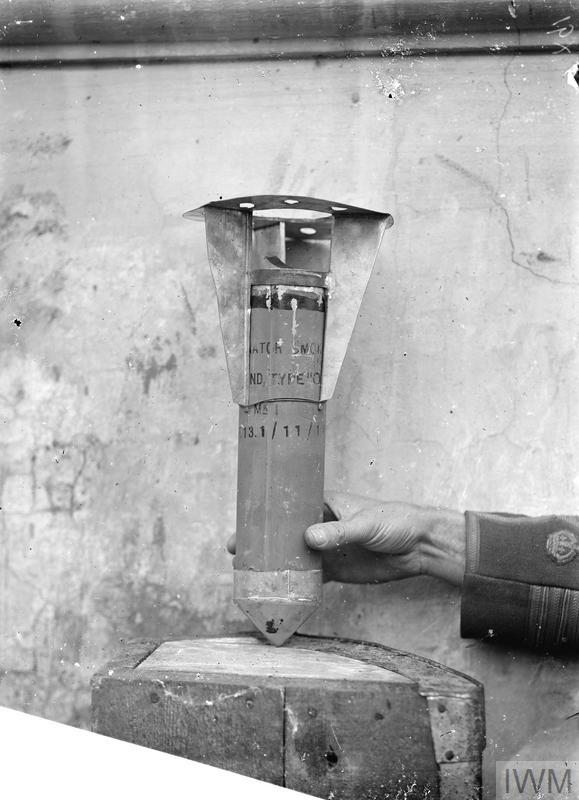
British adamsite-filled "M-bomb"

During the North Russia intervention in 1919, British forces used adamsite (DM) in the form of improvised bombs dropped from DH.9 bomber aircraft against the Red Army.

=== Alleged British use in Mesopotamia ===
It has been alleged that the British used chemical weapons in Mesopotamia during the Iraqi revolt of 1920. Noam Chomsky claimed that Winston Churchill at the time was keen on chemical weapons, suggesting they be used "against recalcitrant Arabs as an experiment", and that he stated to be "strongly in favour of using poisoned gas against uncivilised tribes".

According to some historians, including Geoff Simons and Charles Townshend, the British used chemical weapons in the conflict, while according to Lawrence James and Niall Ferguson the weapons were agreed by Churchill but eventually not used; R.M. Douglas of Colgate University also observed that Churchill's statement had served to convince observers of the existence of weapons of mass destruction which were not actually there.

=== Soviet use in Tambov, Central Asia, and China ===
Lenin's Soviet government employed poison gas in 1921 during the Tambov Rebellion. An order signed by military commanders Tukhachevsky and Vladimir Antonov-Ovseyenko stipulated, "The forests where the bandits are hiding are to be cleared by the use of poison gas. This must be carefully calculated, so that the layer of gas penetrates the forests and kills everyone hiding there."

In the 1930s, the Soviet Union used mustard gas deployed from planes against Basmachi rebels in Central Asia.

During the Soviet invasion of Xinjiang in 1934, Ma Zhongying's New 36th Division put up a fierce resistance at the Battle of Dawan Cheng, but was forced to retreat after Soviets delivered mustard gas from planes.

=== Chinese use ===
A chemical arms race developed during the Warlord Era. The first chemical weapons were imported by a minor Hunan warlord, who bought two small cases of "gas-producing shells" in August 1921. Marshal Cao Kun, approached a British-owned chemical company in Tianjin in 1923; he attempted to order gas bombs, but as far as is known they turned down his proposal. In 1925, Zhang Zuolin had a chemical plant built in Mukden and hired German and Russian experts to produce chlorine, phosgene and mustard gas, in the same year Feng Yuxiang also set up a ‘special arsenal’ to produce chemical weapons designed by Soviet and German experts. All of these efforts appear to have failed. There was one reported incident of chemical warfare when Zhang Zuolin's aircraft dropped gas bombs’ on the forces of Wu Peifu; who branded the use of these bombs as inhumane.

=== Spanish use in Morocco ===
Combined Spanish and French forces dropped mustard gas bombs against Berber rebels and civilians during the Rif War in Spanish Morocco (1921–1927). These attacks marked the first widespread employment of gas warfare in the post-WWI era. The Spanish army indiscriminately used phosgene, diphosgene, chloropicrin and mustard gas against civilian populations, markets and rivers. Although Spain signed the Geneva Protocol in 1925, it only prohibited the use of chemical and biological weapons in international conflicts, instead of non-international conflicts like the Rif War.

In a telegram sent by the High Commissioner of Spanish Morocco Dámaso Berenguer on August 12, 1921, to the Spanish minister of War, Berenguer stated: "I have been obstinately resistant to the use of suffocating gases against these indigenous peoples but after what they have done, and of their treacherous and deceptive conduct, I have to use them with true joy."

According to military aviation general Hidalgo de Cisneros in his autobiographical book Cambio de rumbo, he was the first warfighter to drop a 100-kilogram mustard gas bomb from his Farman F60 Goliath aircraft in the summer of 1924. About 127 fighters and bombers flew in the campaign, dropping around 1,680 bombs each day. The mustard gas bombs were brought from the stockpiles of Germany and delivered to Melilla before being carried on Farman F60 Goliath airplanes. Historian Juan Pando has been the only Spanish historian to have confirmed the usage of mustard gas starting in 1923. Spanish newspaper La Correspondencia de España published an article called Cartas de un soldado (Letters of a soldier) on August 16, 1923, which backed the usage of mustard gas.

Some have cited the chemical weapons used in the region as the main reason for the widespread occurrence of cancer among the population. In 2007, the Catalan party of the Republican Left (Esquerra Republicana de Catalunya) passed a bill to the Spanish Congress of Deputies requesting Spain to acknowledge the "systematic" use of chemical weapons against the population of the Rif mountains; however, the bill was rejected by 33 votes from the governing Socialist Labor Party and the opposition right-wing Popular Party.

=== Italian use in Libya and Ethiopia ===
Italy used mustard gas and other "gruesome measures" against Senussi forces in Libya (see Pacification of Libya, Italian colonization of Libya, Libyan genocide (1929–1934)). Poison gas was used against the Libyans as early as January 1928 The Italians dropped mustard gas from the air.

Beginning in October 1935 and continuing into the following months, Fascist Italy used mustard gas against the Ethiopians during the Second Italo-Abyssinian War in violation of the Geneva Protocol. Italian general Rodolfo Graziani first ordered the use of chemical weapons at Gorrahei against the forces of Ras Nasibu. Benito Mussolini personally authorized Graziani to use chemical weapons. Chemical weapons dropped by warplane "proved to be very effective" and was used "on a massive scale against civilians and troops, as well as to contaminate fields and water supplies." Among the most intense chemical bombardment by the Italian Air Force in Ethiopia occurred in February and March 1936, although "gas warfare continued, with varying intensity, until March 1939." J. F. C. Fuller, who was present in Ethiopia during the conflict, stated that mustard gas "was the decisive tactical factor in the war." Some estimate that up to one-third of Ethiopian casualties of the war were caused by chemical weapons.

The Italians' deployment of mustard gas prompted international criticism. In April 1936, British Prime Minister Stanley Baldwin told Parliament: "If a great European nation, in spite of having given its signature to the Geneva Protocol against the use of such gases, employs them in Africa, what guarantee have we that they may not be used in Europe?" Mussolini initially denied the use of chemical weapons; later, Mussolini and Italian government sought to justify their use as lawful retaliation for Ethiopian atrocities.

After the liberation of Ethiopia in 1941, Ethiopia repeatedly but unsuccessfully sought to prosecute Italian war criminals. The Allied powers excluded Ethiopia from the United Nations War Crimes Commission (established in 1942) because the Allies feared that Ethiopia would seek to prosecute Italian commander Pietro Badoglio, who had ordered the use of chemical gas in the Second Italo-Ethiopian War but later "became a valuable ally against the Axis powers" after the fall of the Fascist regime in Italy, serving as a senior officer in the Italian Co-belligerent Army. In 1946, Ethiopian ruler Haile Selassie again sought "to prosecute senior Italian officials who had sanctioned the use of chemical weapons and had committed other war crimes such as torturing and executing Ethiopian prisoners and citizens during the Italian-Ethiopian War." These attempts failed, in large part because the Western Allies wished to avoid alienating the Italian government at a time when Italy was seen as key to containing the Soviet Union.

Following World War II, the Italian government denied that Italy had ever used chemical weapons in Africa; only in 1995 did Italy formally acknowledge that it had used chemical weapons in colonial wars.

=== Nerve agents ===
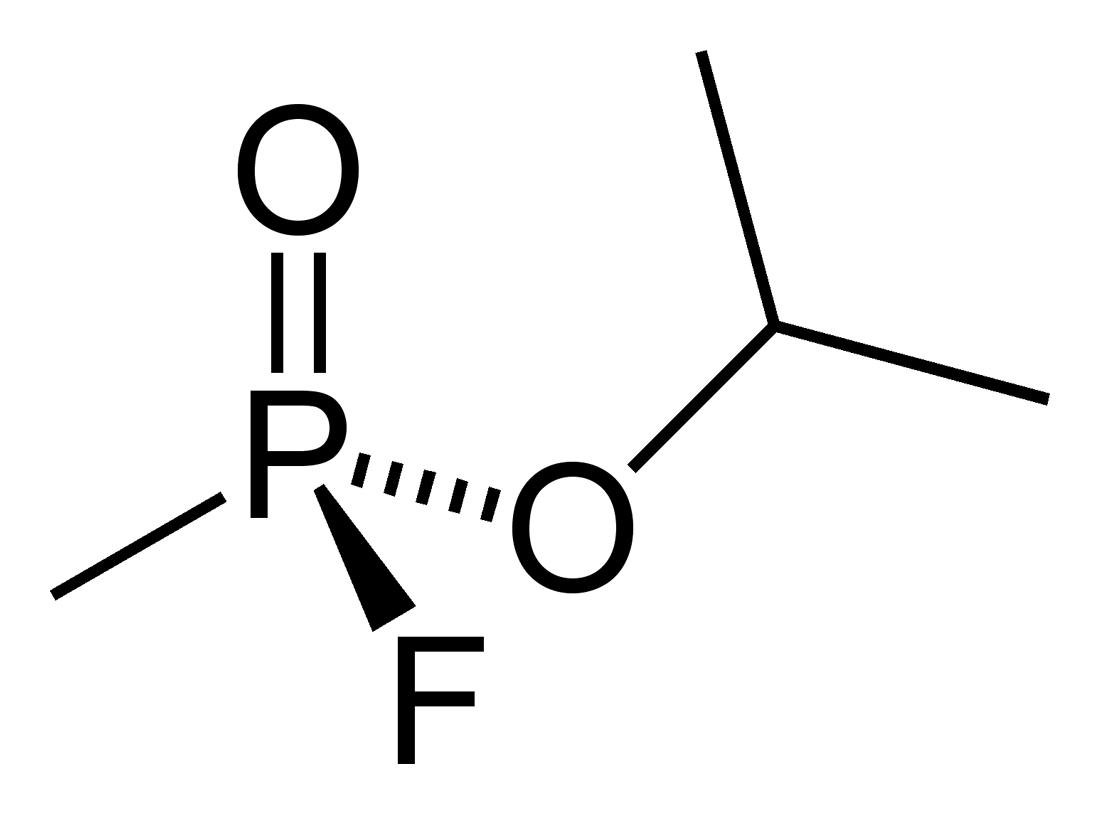
The chemical structure of sarin nerve gas, developed in Germany in 1939

Shortly after the end of World War I, Germany's General Staff enthusiastically pursued a recapture of their preeminent position in chemical warfare. In 1923, Hans von Seeckt pointed the way, by suggesting that German poison gas research move in the direction of delivery by aircraft in support of mobile warfare. Also in 1923, at the behest of the German army, poison gas expert Dr. Hugo Stoltzenberg negotiated with the USSR to build a huge chemical weapons plant at Trotsk, on the Volga river.

Collaboration between Germany and the Soviet Union in poison gas research continued on and off through the 1920s. In 1924, German officers debated the use of poison gas versus non-lethal chemical weapons against civilians.

Chemical warfare was revolutionized by Nazi Germany's discovery of the nerve agents tabun (in 1937) and sarin (in 1939) by Gerhard Schrader, a chemist of IG Farben.

IG Farben was Germany's premier poison gas manufacturer during World War II, so the weaponization of these agents cannot be considered accidental. Both were turned over to the German Army Weapons Office prior to the outbreak of the war.

The nerve agent soman was later discovered by Nobel Prize laureate Richard Kuhn and his collaborator Konrad Henkel at the Kaiser Wilhelm Institute for Medical Research in Heidelberg in the spring of 1944. The Germans developed and manufactured large quantities of several agents, but chemical warfare was not extensively used by either side. Chemical troops were set up (in Germany since 1934) and delivery technology was actively developed.

== World War II ==
=== Imperial Japanese Army ===
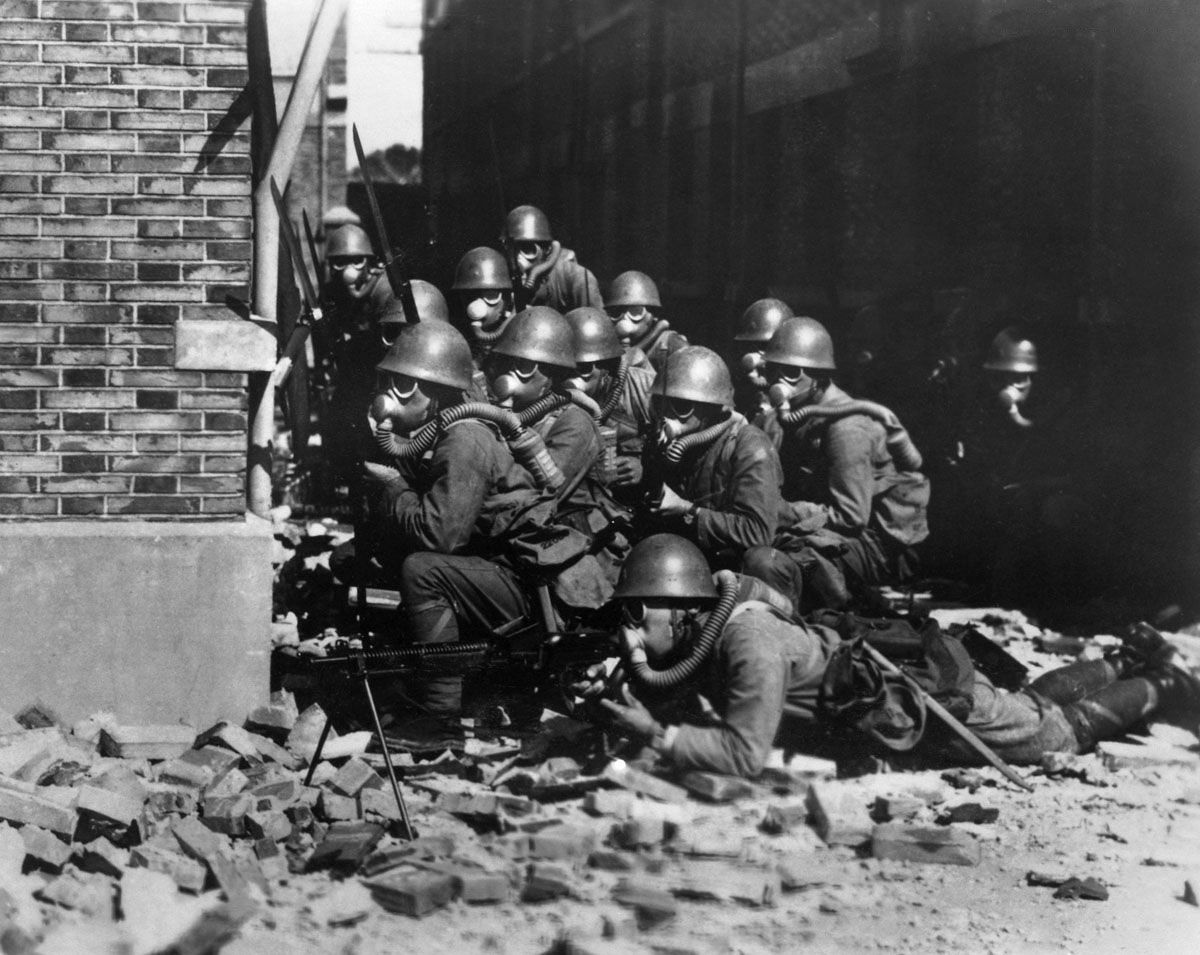
Japanese Special Naval Landing Force wearing gas masks and rubber gloves during a chemical attack near Chapei in the Battle of Shanghai

Despite the 1899 Hague Declaration IV, 2 – Declaration on the Use of Projectiles the Object of Which is the Diffusion of Asphyxiating or Deleterious Gases, Article 23 (a) of the 1907 Hague Convention IV – The Laws and Customs of War on Land, and a resolution adopted against Japan by the League of Nations on May 14, 1938, the Imperial Japanese Army frequently used chemical weapons. Because of fear of retaliation, however, those weapons were never used against Westerners, but against other Asians judged "inferior" by imperial propaganda. According to historians Yoshiaki Yoshimi and Kentaro Awaya, gas weapons, such as tear gas, were used only sporadically in 1937 but in early 1938, the Imperial Japanese Army began full-scale use of sneeze and nausea gas (red), and from mid-1939, used mustard gas (yellow) against both Kuomintang and Communist Chinese troops.

According to historians Yoshiaki Yoshimi and Seiya Matsuno, the chemical weapons were authorized by specific orders given by Emperor Hirohito himself, transmitted by the chief of staff of the army. For example, the Emperor authorized the use of toxic gas on 375 separate occasions during the Battle of Wuhan from August to October 1938. They were also profusely used during the invasion of Changde. Those orders were transmitted either by Prince Kan'in Kotohito or General Hajime Sugiyama. The Imperial Japanese Army had used mustard gas and the US-developed (CWS-1918) blister agent lewisite against Chinese troops and guerrillas. Experiments involving chemical weapons were conducted on live prisoners (Unit 731 and Unit 516).

The Japanese also carried chemical weapons as they swept through Southeast Asia towards Australia. Some of these items were captured and analyzed by the Allies. Historian Geoff Plunkett has recorded how Australia covertly imported 1,000,000 chemical weapons from the United Kingdom from 1942 onwards and stored them in many storage depots around the country, including three tunnels in the Blue Mountains to the west of Sydney. They were to be used as a retaliatory measure if the Japanese first used chemical weapons. Buried chemical weapons have been recovered at Marrangaroo and Columboola.

=== Nazi Germany ===
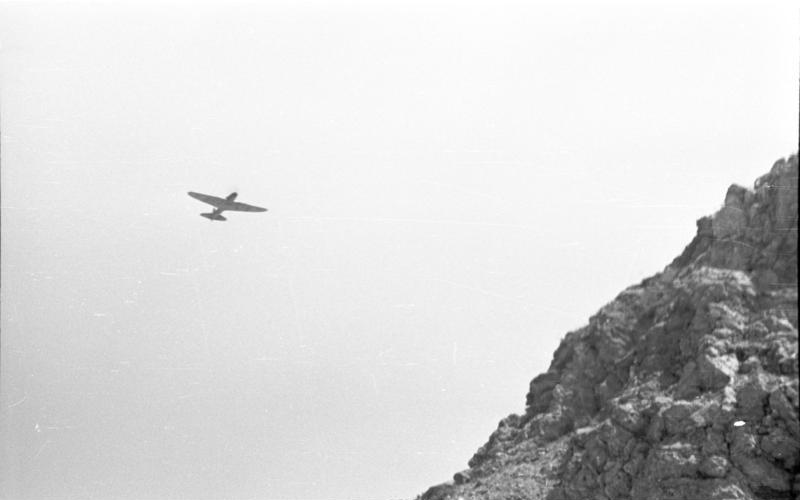
The Germans eventually used poison gas on survivors from the Battle of Kerch, May 1942.

During the Holocaust, a genocide perpetrated by Nazi Germany, millions of Jews, Romani, Slavs, homosexuals, people with disabilities, and other victims were gassed with carbon monoxide and hydrogen cyanide (including Zyklon B). This remains the deadliest use of poison gas in history. Nevertheless, the Nazis did not extensively use chemical weapons in combat, at least not against the Western Allies, despite maintaining an active chemical weapons program in which the Nazis used concentration camp prisoners as forced labor to secretly manufacture tabun, a nerve gas, and experimented upon concentration camp victims to test the effects of the gas. Otto Ambros of IG Farben was a chief chemical-weapons expert for the Nazis.

The Nazis' decision to avoid the use of chemical weapons on the battlefield has been variously attributed to a lack of technical ability in the German chemical weapons program and fears that the Allies would retaliate with their own chemical weapons. It also has been speculated to have arisen from Adolf Hitler's experiences as a soldier in the German army during World War I, where he was injured by a British mustard gas attack in 1918. After the Battle of Stalingrad, Joseph Goebbels, Robert Ley, and Martin Bormann urged Hitler to approve the use of tabun and other chemical weapons to slow the Soviet advance. At a May 1943 meeting in the Wolf's Lair, however, Hitler was told by Ambros that Germany had 45,000 tons of chemical gas stockpiled, but that the Allies likely had far more. Hitler responded by suddenly leaving the room and ordering production of tabun and sarin to be doubled, but "fearing some rogue officer would use them and spark Allied retaliation, he ordered that no chemical weapons be transported to the Russian front." After the Allied invasion of Italy, the Germans rapidly moved to remove or destroy both German and Italian chemical-weapon stockpiles, "for the same reason that Hitler had ordered them pulled from the Russian front—they feared that local commanders would use them and trigger Allied chemical retaliation."

Stanley P. Lovell, deputy director for Research and Development of the Office of Strategic Services, reports in his book Of Spies and Stratagems that the Allies knew the Germans had quantities of Gas Blau available for use in the defense of the Atlantic Wall. The use of nerve gas on the Normandy beachhead would have seriously impeded the Allies and possibly caused the invasion to fail altogether. He submitted the question "Why was nerve gas not used in Normandy?" to be asked of Hermann Göring during his interrogation after the war had ended. Göring answered that the reason was that the Wehrmacht was dependent upon horse-drawn transport to move supplies to their combat units, and had never been able to devise a gas mask horses could tolerate; the versions they developed would not pass enough pure air to allow the horses to pull a cart. Thus, gas was of no use to the German Army under most conditions.

The Nazis did use chemical weapons in combat on several occasions along the Black Sea, notably in Sevastopol, where they used toxic smoke to force Soviet resistance fighters out of caverns below the city, in violation of the 1925 Geneva Protocol. The Nazis also used asphyxiating gas in the catacombs of Odessa in November 1941, following their capture of the city, and in late May 1942 during the Battle of the Kerch Peninsula in eastern Crimea. Victor Israelyan, a Soviet ambassador, reported that the latter incident was perpetrated by the Wehrmacht's Chemical Forces and organized by a special detail of SS troops with the help of a field engineer battalion. Chemical Forces General Ochsner reported to German command in June 1942 that a chemical unit had taken part in the battle. After the battle in mid-May 1942, roughly 3,000 Red Army soldiers and Soviet civilians not evacuated by sea were besieged in a series of caves and tunnels in the nearby Adzhimushkay quarry. After holding out for approximately three months, "poison gas was released into the tunnels, killing all but a few score of the Soviet defenders." Thousands of those killed around Adzhimushkay were documented to have been killed by asphyxiation from gas.

In February 1943, German troops stationed in Kuban received a telegram: "Russians might have to be cleared out of the mountain range with gas." The troops also received two wagons of toxin antidotes.

=== Western Allies ===
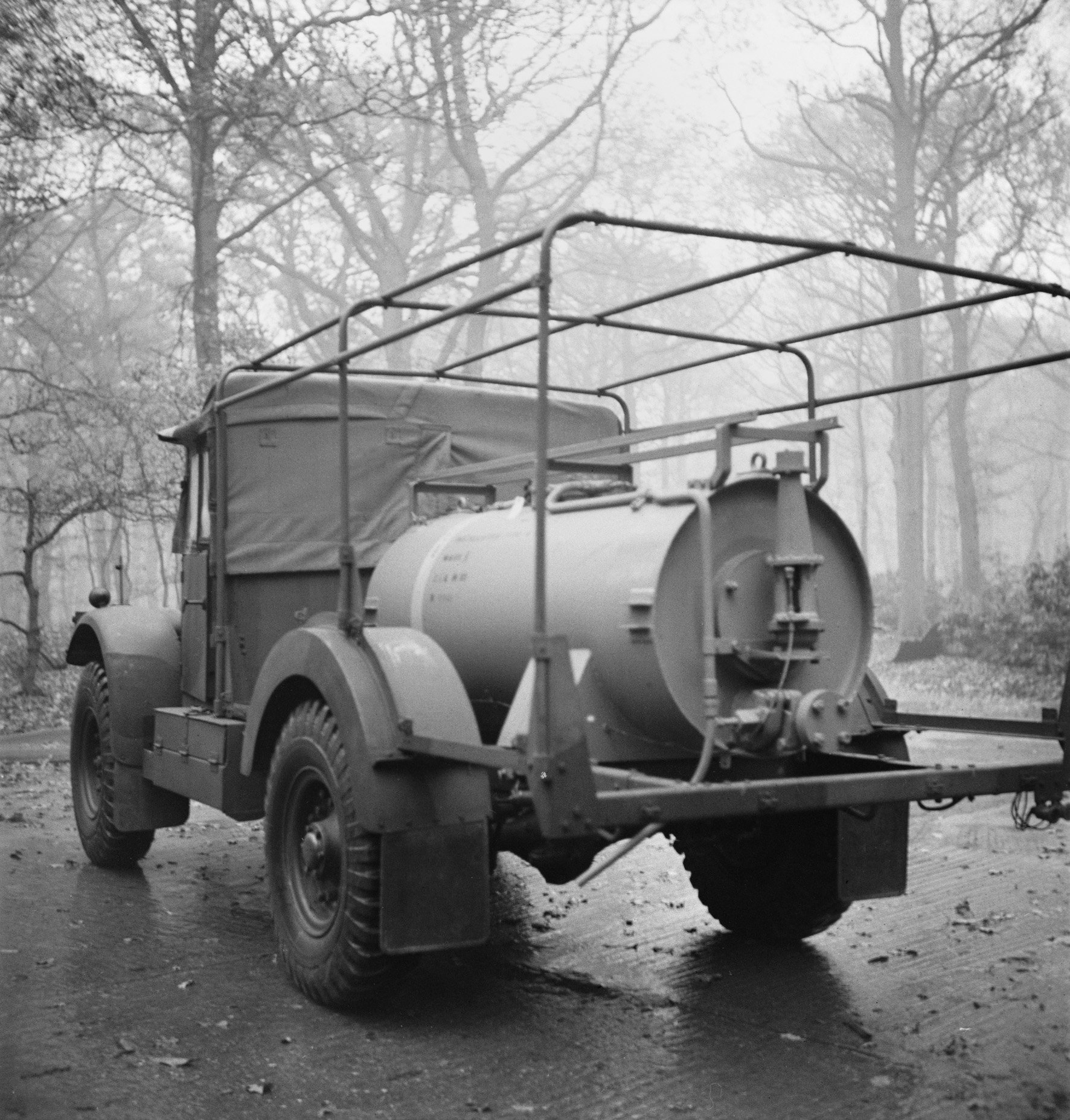
The British stockpiled chemical weapons to use in case of a German invasion. Pictured is a chemical warfare bulk decontamination vehicle.

The Western Allies did not use chemical weapons during the Second World War. The British planned to use mustard gas and phosgene to help repel a German invasion in 1940–1941, and had there been an invasion might have also deployed it against German cities. General Alan Brooke, Commander-in-Chief, Home Forces, in command of British anti-invasion preparations of the Second World War said that he "...had every intention of using sprayed mustard gas on the beaches" in an annotation in his diary. The British manufactured mustard, chlorine, lewisite, phosgene and Paris Green and stored them at airfields and depots for use on the beaches.

The mustard gas stockpile was enlarged in 1942–1943 for possible use by RAF Bomber Command against German cities, and in 1944 for possible retaliatory use if German forces used chemical weapons against the D-Day landings.

Winston Churchill, the British Prime Minister, issued a memorandum advocating a chemical strike on German cities using poison gas and possibly anthrax. Although the idea was rejected, it has provoked debate. In July 1944, fearing that rocket attacks on London would get even worse, and saying he would only use chemical weapons if it were "life or death for us" or would "shorten the war by a year", Churchill wrote a secret memorandum asking his military chiefs to "think very seriously over this question of using poison gas." He stated "it is absurd to consider morality on this topic when everybody used it in the last war without a word of complaint..."

The Joint Planning Staff, however, advised against the use of gas because it would inevitably provoke Germany to retaliate with gas. They argued that this would be to the Allies' disadvantage in France both for military reasons and because it might "seriously impair our relations with the civilian population when it became generally known that chemical warfare was first employed by us."

In 1945, the U.S. Army's Chemical Warfare Service standardized improved chemical warfare rockets intended for the new M9 and M9A1 "Bazooka" launchers, adopting the M26 Gas Rocket, a cyanogen chloride (CK)-filled warhead for the 2.36-in rocket launcher. CK, a deadly blood agent, was capable of penetrating the protective filter barriers in some gas masks, and was seen as an effective agent against Japanese forces (particularly those hiding in caves or bunkers), whose gas masks lacked the impregnants that would provide protection against the chemical reaction of CK. While stockpiled in US inventory, the CK rocket was never deployed or issued to combat personnel.

==== Accidental release ====
On the night of December 2, 1943, German Ju 88 bombers attacked the port of Bari in Southern Italy, sinking several American ships—among them the SS John Harvey, which was carrying mustard gas intended for use in retaliation by the Allies if German forces initiated gas warfare. The presence of the gas was highly classified, and authorities ashore had no knowledge of it, which increased the number of fatalities since physicians, who had no idea that they were dealing with the effects of mustard gas, prescribed treatment improper for those suffering from exposure and immersion.

The whole affair was kept secret at the time and for many years after the war. According to the U.S. military account, "Sixty-nine deaths were attributed in whole or in part to the mustard gas, most of them American merchant seamen" out of 628 mustard gas military casualties.

The large number of civilian casualties among the Italian population was not recorded. Part of the confusion and controversy derives from the fact that the German attack was highly destructive and lethal in itself, also apart from the accidental additional effects of the gas (the attack was nicknamed "The Little Pearl Harbor"), and attribution of the causes of death between the gas and other causes is far from easy.

Rick Atkinson, in his book The Day of Battle, describes the intelligence that prompted Allied leaders to deploy mustard gas to Italy. This included Italian intelligence that Adolf Hitler had threatened to use gas against Italy if the state changed sides, and prisoner of war interrogations suggesting that preparations were being made to use a "new, egregiously potent gas" if the war turned decisively against Germany. Atkinson concludes, "No commander in 1943 could be cavalier about a manifest threat by Germany to use gas."

=== Soviet Union ===
There were multiple reports that the Soviets used battle gas, distributed variously by artillery, airplane, and blowers, in December 1939 during the Winter War. Tests were inconclusive as the detectability of gases diminished quickly. The common conclusion of Finnish authorities by the end of the war was that no chemical weapons were used, although accidental use is also possible.

== Development during the Cold War ==
After World War II, the Allies recovered German artillery shells containing the three German nerve agents of the day (tabun, sarin, and soman), prompting further research into nerve agents by all of the former Allies.

Although the threat of global thermonuclear war was foremost in the minds of most during the Cold War, both the Soviet and Western governments put enormous resources into developing chemical and biological weapons.

=== Britain ===
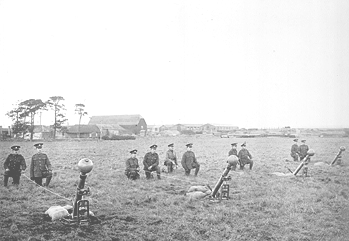
Porton Down was first established in 1916 and became the centre for the development of chemical weapons.

In the late 1940s and early 1950s, British postwar chemical weapons research was based at the Porton Down facility. Research was aimed at providing Britain with the means to arm itself with a modern nerve-agent-based capability and to develop specific means of defense against these agents.

Ranajit Ghosh, a chemist at the Plant Protection Laboratories of Imperial Chemical Industries was investigating a class of organophosphate compounds (organophosphate esters of substituted aminoethanethiols), for use as a pesticide. In 1954, ICI put one of them on the market under the trade name Amiton. It was subsequently withdrawn, as it was too toxic for safe use.

The toxicity did not go unnoticed, and samples of it were sent to the research facility at Porton Down for evaluation. After the evaluation was complete, several members of this class of compounds were developed into a new group of much more lethal nerve agents, the V agents. The best-known of these is probably VX, assigned the UK Rainbow Code Purple Possum, with the Russian V-Agent coming a close second (Amiton is largely forgotten as VG).

On the defensive side, there were years of difficult work to develop the means of prophylaxis, therapy, rapid detection and identification, decontamination and more effective protection of the body against nerve agents, capable of exerting effects through the skin, the eyes and respiratory tract.

Tests were carried out on servicemen to determine the effects of nerve agents on human subjects, with one recorded death due to a nerve gas experiment. There have been persistent allegations of unethical human experimentation at Porton Down, such as those relating to the death of Leading Aircraftman Ronald Maddison, aged 20, in 1953. Maddison was taking part in sarin nerve agent toxicity tests. Sarin was dripped onto his arm and he died shortly afterwards.

In the 1950s, the Chemical Defence Experimental Establishment became involved with the development of CS, a riot control agent, and took an increasing role in trauma and wound ballistics work. Both these facets of Porton Down's work had become more important because of the situation in Northern Ireland.

In the early 1950s, nerve agents such as sarin were produced—about 20 tons were made from 1954 until 1956. CDE Nancekuke was an important factory for stockpiling chemical weapons. Small amounts of VX were produced there, mainly for laboratory test purposes, but also to validate plant designs and optimise chemical processes for potential mass production. However, full-scale mass production of VX agent never took place, with the 1956 decision to end the UK's offensive chemical weapons programme. In the late 1950s, the chemical weapons production plant at Nancekuke was mothballed, but was maintained through the 1960s and 1970s in a state whereby production of chemical weapons could easily re-commence if required.

=== United States ===
In 1952, the U.S. Army patented a process for the "Preparation of Toxic Ricin", publishing a method of producing this powerful toxin. In 1958 the British government traded their VX technology with the United States in exchange for information on thermonuclear weapons. By 1961 the U.S. was producing large amounts of VX and performing its own nerve agent research. This research produced at least three more agents; the four agents (VE, VG, VM, VX) are collectively known as the "V-Series" class of nerve agents.

Between 1951 and 1969, Dugway Proving Ground was the site of testing for various chemical and biological agents, including an open-air aerodynamic dissemination test in 1968 that accidentally killed, on neighboring farms, approximately 6,400 sheep by an unspecified nerve agent.

From 1962 to 1973, the Department of Defense planned 134 tests under Project 112, a chemical and biological weapons "vulnerability-testing program." In 2002, the Pentagon admitted for the first time that some of tests used real chemical and biological weapons, not just harmless simulants.

Specifically under Project SHAD, 37 secret tests were conducted in California, Alaska, Florida, Hawaii, Maryland, and Utah. Land tests in Alaska and Hawaii used artillery shells filled with sarin and VX, while Navy trials off the coasts of Florida, California and Hawaii tested the ability of ships and crew to perform under biological and chemical warfare, without the crew's knowledge. The code name for the sea tests was Project Shipboard Hazard and Defense—"SHAD" for short.

In October 2002, the Senate Armed Forces Subcommittee on Personnel held hearings as the controversial news broke that chemical agents had been tested on thousands of American military personnel. The hearings were chaired by Senator Max Cleland, former VA administrator and Vietnam War veteran.

==== United States chemical respiratory protection standardization ====
In December 2001, the United States Department of Health and Human Services, Centers for Disease Control and Prevention (CDC), National Institute for Occupational Safety and Health (NIOSH), and National Personal Protective Technology Laboratory (NPPTL), along with the U.S. Army Research, Development and Engineering Command (RDECOM), Edgewood Chemical and Biological Center (ECBC), and the U.S. Department of Commerce National Institute of Standards and Technology (NIST) published the first of six technical performance standards and test procedures designed to evaluate and certify respirators intended for use by civilian emergency responders to a chemical, biological, radiological, or nuclear weapon release, detonation, or terrorism incident.

To date NIOSH/NPPTL has published six new respirator performance standards based on a tiered approach that relies on traditional industrial respirator certification policy, next-generation emergency response respirator performance requirements, and special live chemical warfare agent testing requirements of the classes of respirators identified to offer respiratory protection against chemical, biological, radiological, and nuclear (CBRN) agent inhalation hazards. These CBRN respirators are commonly known as open-circuit self-contained breathing apparatus (CBRN SCBA), air-purifying respirator (CBRN APR), air-purifying escape respirator (CBRN APER), self-contained escape respirator (CBRN SCER) and loose- or tight-fitting powered air-purifying respirators (CBRN PAPR).

=== Soviet Union ===
Due to the secrecy of the Soviet Union's government, very little information was available about the direction and progress of the Soviet chemical weapons until relatively recently. After the fall of the Soviet Union, Russian chemist Vil Mirzayanov published articles revealing illegal chemical weapons experimentation in Russia.

In 1993, Mirzayanov was imprisoned and fired from his job at the State Research Institute of Organic Chemistry and Technology, where he had worked for 26 years. In March 1994, after a major campaign by U.S. scientists on his behalf, Mirzayanov was released.

Among the information related by Vil Mirzayanov was the direction of Soviet research into the development of even more toxic nerve agents, which saw most of its success during the mid-1980s. Several highly toxic agents were developed during this period; the only unclassified information regarding these agents is that they are known in the open literature only as "Foliant" agents (named after the program under which they were developed) and by various code designations, such as A-230 and A-232.

According to Mirzayanov, the Soviets also developed weapons that were safer to handle, leading to the development of binary weapons, in which precursors for the nerve agents are mixed in a munition to produce the agent just prior to its use. Because the precursors are generally significantly less hazardous than the agents themselves, this technique makes handling and transporting the munitions a great deal simpler.

Additionally, precursors to the agents are usually much easier to stabilize than the agents themselves, so this technique also made it possible to increase the shelf life of the agents a great deal. During the 1980s and 1990s, binary versions of several Soviet agents were developed and designated "Novichok" agents (after the Russian word for "newcomer"). Together with Lev Fedorov, he told the secret Novichok story exposed in the newspaper The Moscow News.

== Use in conflicts after World War II ==
=== North Yemen ===
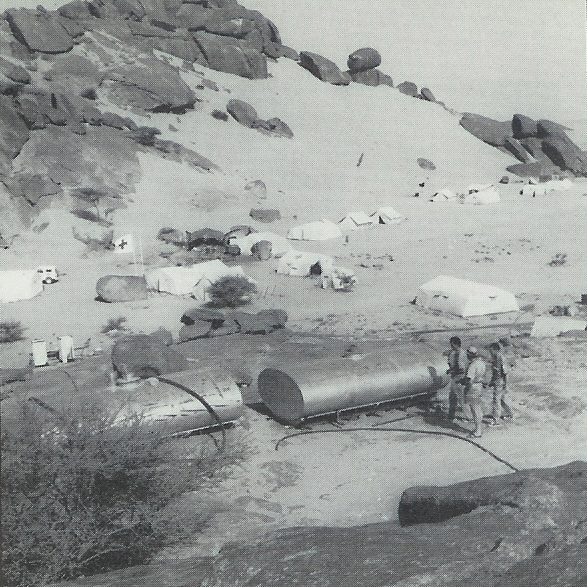
The International Red Cross hospital at Uqd, North Yemen, where the use of chemical weapons was alleged to have occurred

The first attack of the North Yemen Civil War took place on June 8, 1963, against Kawma, a village of about 100 inhabitants in northern Yemen, killing about seven people and damaging the eyes and lungs of 25 others. This incident is considered to have been experimental, and the bombs were described as "home-made, amateurish and relatively ineffective". The Egyptian authorities suggested that the reported incidents were probably caused by napalm, not gas.

There were no reports of gas during 1964, and only a few were reported in 1965. The reports grew more frequent in late 1966. On December 11, 1966, fifteen gas bombs killed two people and injured thirty-five. On January 5, 1967, the biggest gas attack came against the village of Kitaf, causing 270 casualties, including 140 fatalities. The target may have been Prince Hassan bin Yahya, who had installed his headquarters nearby. The Egyptian government denied using poison gas, and alleged that Britain and the US were using the reports as psychological warfare against Egypt. On February 12, 1967, it said it would welcome a UN investigation. On March 1, U Thant, the then Secretary-General of the United Nations, said he was "powerless" to deal with the matter.

On May 10, 1967, the twin villages of Gahar and Gadafa in Wadi Hirran, where Prince Mohamed bin Mohsin was in command, were gas bombed, killing at least seventy-five. The Red Cross was alerted and on June 2, 1967, it issued a statement in Geneva expressing concern. The Institute of Forensic Medicine at the University of Berne made a statement, based on a Red Cross report, that the gas was likely to have been halogenous derivatives—phosgene, mustard gas, lewisite, chloride or cyanogen bromide.

=== Rhodesian Bush War ===
Evidence points to a top-secret Rhodesian program in the 1970s to use organophosphate pesticides and heavy metal rodenticides to contaminate clothing as well as food and beverages. The contaminated items were covertly introduced into insurgent supply chains. Hundreds of insurgent deaths were reported, although the actual death toll likely rose over 1,000.

=== Angola ===
During the Cuban intervention in Angola, United Nations toxicologists certified that residue from both VX and sarin nerve agents had been discovered in plants, water, and soil where Cuban units were conducting operations against National Union for the Total Independence of Angola (UNITA) insurgents. In 1985, UNITA made the first of several claims that their forces were the target of chemical weapons, specifically organophosphates. The following year guerrillas reported being bombarded with an unidentified greenish-yellow agent on three separate occasions. Depending on the length and intensity of exposure, victims suffered blindness or death. The toxin was also observed to have killed plant life. Shortly afterwards, UNITA also sighted strikes carried out with a brown agent which it claimed resembled mustard gas. As early as 1984 a research team dispatched by the University of Ghent had examined patients in UNITA field hospitals showing signs of exposure to nerve agents, although it found no evidence of mustard gas.

The UN first accused Cuba of deploying chemical weapons against Angolan civilians and partisans in 1988. Wouter Basson later disclosed that South African military intelligence had long verified the use of unidentified chemical weapons on Angolan soil; this was to provide the impetus for their own biological warfare programme, Project Coast. During the Battle of Cuito Cuanavale, South African troops then fighting in Angola were issued with gas masks and ordered to rehearse chemical weapons drills. Although the status of its own chemical weapons program remained uncertain, South Africa also deceptively bombarded Cuban and Angolan units with colored smoke in an attempt to induce hysteria or mass panic. According to Defence Minister Magnus Malan, this would force the Cubans to share the inconvenience of having to take preventative measures such as donning NBC suits, which would cut combat effectiveness in half. The tactic was effective: beginning in early 1988 Cuban units posted to Angola were issued with full protective gear in anticipation of a South African chemical strike.

On October 29, 1988, personnel attached to Angola's 59 Brigade, accompanied by six Soviet military advisors, reported being struck with chemical weapons on the banks of the Mianei River. The attack occurred shortly after one in the afternoon. Four Angolan soldiers lost consciousness while the others complained of violent headaches and nausea. That November the Angolan representative to the UN accused South Africa of employing poison gas near Cuito Cuanavale for the first time.

=== Falklands War ===
Technically, the reported employment of tear gas by Argentine forces during the 1982 invasion of the Falkland Islands constitutes chemical warfare. However, the tear gas grenades were employed as nonlethal weapons to avoid British casualties. The barrack buildings the weapons were used on proved to be deserted in any case. The British claim that more lethal, but legally justifiable as they are not considered chemical weapons under the Chemical Weapons Convention, white phosphorus grenades were used.

=== Afghanistan ===
There were reports of chemical weapons being used by Soviet forces during the Soviet–Afghan War, sometimes against civilians.

=== Vietnamese border raids in Thailand ===
There is some evidence suggesting that Vietnamese troops used phosgene gas against Cambodian resistance forces in Thailand during the 1984–1985 dry-season offensive on the Thai-Cambodian border.

=== Iran–Iraq War ===
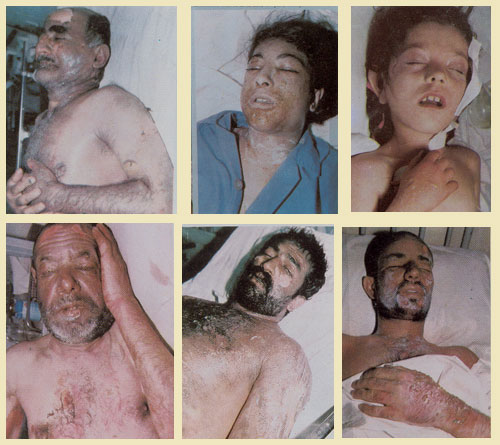
Victims of the 1987 chemical attack on Sardasht, West Azerbaijan, Iran

Chemical weapons employed by Saddam Hussein killed and injured numerous Iranians and Iraqi Kurds. According to Iraqi documents, assistance in developing chemical weapons was obtained from firms in many countries, including the United States, West Germany, the Netherlands, the United Kingdom, and France.

About 100,000 Iranian soldiers were victims of Iraq's chemical attacks. Many were hit by mustard gas. The official estimate does not include the civilian population contaminated in bordering towns or the children and relatives of veterans, many of whom have developed blood, lung and skin complications, according to the Organization for Veterans. Nerve gas agents killed about 20,000 Iranian soldiers immediately, according to official reports. Of the 80,000 survivors, some 5,000 seek medical treatment regularly and about 1,000 are still hospitalized with severe, chronic conditions.

According to the Foreign Policy, the "Iraqis used mustard gas and sarin prior to four major offensives in early 1988 that relied on U.S. satellite imagery, maps, and other intelligence. ... According to recently declassified CIA documents and interviews with former intelligence officials like Francona, the U.S. had firm evidence of Iraqi chemical attacks beginning in 1983."

=== Halabja ===
In March 1988, the Iraqi Kurdish town of Halabja was exposed to multiple chemical agents dropped from warplanes; these "may have included mustard gas, the nerve agents sarin, tabun and VX and possibly cyanide." Between 3,200 and 5,000 people were killed, and between 7,000 and 10,000 were injured. Some reports indicated that three-quarters of them were women and children. The preponderance of the evidence indicates that Iraq was responsible for the attack.

=== Persian Gulf War ===
The U.S. Department of Defense and Central Intelligence Agency's longstanding official position is that Iraqi forces under Saddam Hussein did not use chemical weapons during the Persian Gulf War in 1991. In a memorandum in 1994 to veterans of the war, Defense Secretary William J. Perry and General John M. Shalikashvili, the chairman of the Joint Chiefs of Staff, wrote that "There is no evidence, classified or unclassified, that indicates that chemical or biological weapons were used in the Persian Gulf."

However, chemical weapons expert Jonathan B. Tucker, writing in the Nonproliferation Review in 1997, determined that although "[t]he absence of severe chemical injuries or fatalities among Coalition forces makes it clear that no large-scale Iraqi employment of chemical weapons occurred," an array of "circumstantial evidence from a variety of sources suggests that Iraq deployed chemical weapons into the Kuwait Theater of Operations (KTO)—the area including Kuwait and Iraq south of the 31st Parallel, where the ground war was fought—and engaged in sporadic chemical warfare against Coalition forces." In addition to intercepts of Iraqi military communications and publicly available reporting:

Other sources of evidence for sporadic Iraqi chemical warfare include U.S. intelligence reports on the presence of Iraqi chemical weapons in the KTO; military log entries describing the discovery by U.S. units of chemical munitions in Iraqi bunkers during and after the ground war; incidents in which troops reported acute symptoms of toxic chemical exposure; and credible detections of chemical-warfare agents by Czech, French, and American forces.

Nerve agents (specifically, tabun, sarin, and cyclosarin) and blister agents (specifically, sulfur-mustard and lewisite) were detected at Iraqi sites.

The threat itself of gas warfare had a major effect on Israel, which was not part of the coalition forces led by the US. Israel was attacked with 39 Scud missiles, most of which were knocked down in the air above their targets by Patriot missiles developed by Raytheon together with Israel, and supplied by the US. Sirens warned of the attacks approximately 10 minutes before their expected arrival, and Israelis donned gas masks and entered sealed "safe" rooms, over a period of 5 weeks. Babies were issued special gas-safe cribs, and religious men were issued gas masks that allowed them to preserve their beards.

In 2014, tapes from Saddam Hussain's archives revealed that Saddam had given orders to use gas against Israel as a last resort if his military communications with the army were cut off.

In 2015, The New York Times published an article about the declassified report of Operation Avarice in 2005 in which over 400 chemical weapons including many rockets and missiles from the Iran-Iraq war period were recovered and subsequently destroyed by the CIA. Many other stockpiles, estimated by UNSCOM up to 600 metric tons of chemical weapons, were known to have existed and even admitted by Saddam's regime, but claimed by them to have been destroyed. These have never been found but are believed to still exist.

=== Iraq War ===
During invasion of Iraq, American service members who demolished or handled older explosive ordnance may have been exposed to blister agents (mustard agent) or nerve agents (sarin). According to The New York Times, "In all, American troops secretly reported finding roughly 5,000 chemical warheads, shells or aviation bombs, according to interviews with dozens of participants, Iraqi and American officials, and heavily redacted intelligence documents obtained under the Freedom of Information Act." Among these, over 2,400 nerve-agent rockets were found in summer 2006 at Camp Taji, a former Iraqi Republican Guard compound. "These weapons were not part of an active arsenal"; "they were remnants from an Iraqi program in the 1980s during the Iran-Iraq war".

=== Syrian civil war ===
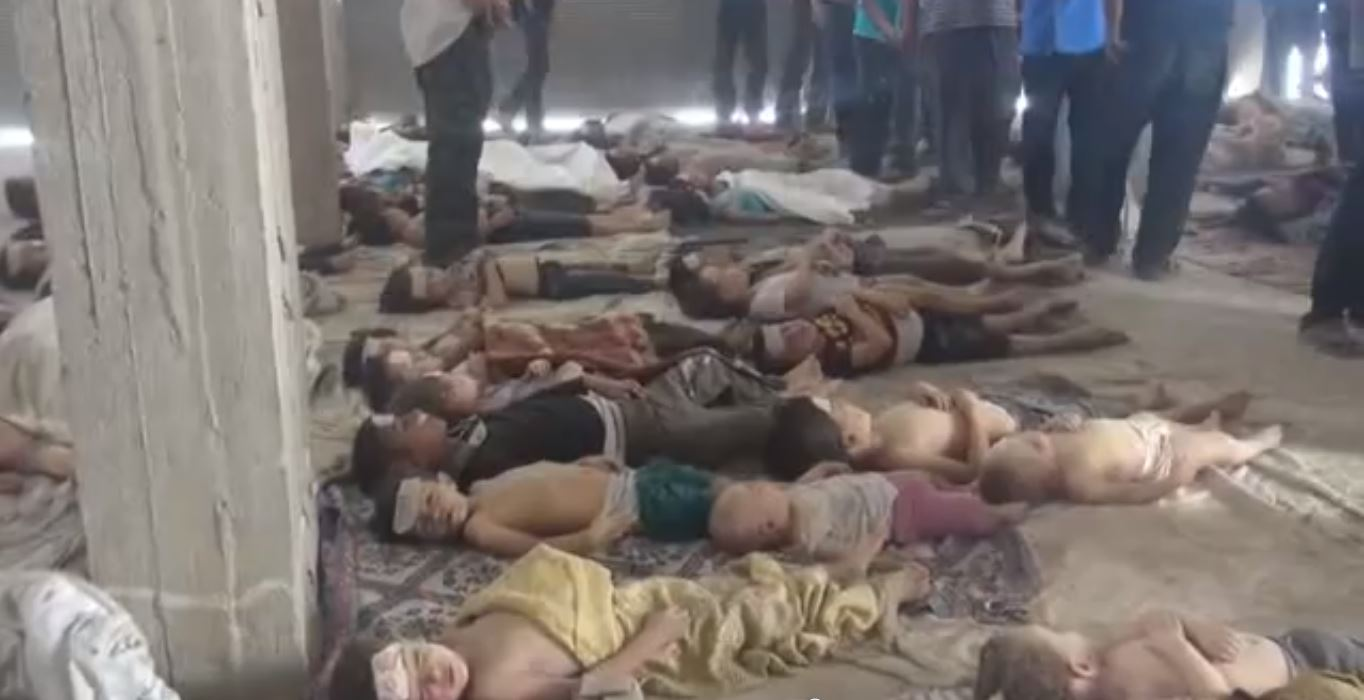
Some of the victims of the Ghouta, Syria attack, August 21, 2013

Sarin, mustard gas, and chlorine have been used during the conflict. Numerous casualties led to an international reaction, especially the 2013 Ghouta attacks. A UN fact-finding mission was requested to investigate alleged chemical weapons attacks. In four cases the UN inspectors confirmed use of sarin gas. In August 2016, a confidential report by the United Nations and the OPCW explicitly blamed the Syrian military of Bashar al-Assad for dropping chemical weapons (chlorine bombs) on the towns of Talmenes in April 2014 and Sarmin in March 2015 and ISIS for using sulfur mustard on the town of Marea in August 2015. In 2016, Jaysh al-Islam rebel group had used chlorine gas or other agents against Kurdish militia and civilians in the Sheikh Maqsood neighborhood of Aleppo.

Many countries, including the United States and the European Union have accused the Syrian government of conducting several chemical attacks. Following the 2013 Ghouta attacks and international pressure, Syria acceded to the Chemical Weapons Convention and the destruction of Syria's chemical weapons began. In 2015 the UN mission disclosed previously undeclared traces of sarin compounds in a "military research site". After the April 2017 Khan Shaykhun chemical attack, the United States launched its first attack against Syrian government forces. On 14 April 2018, the United States, France and the United Kingdom carried out a series of joint military strikes against multiple government sites in Syria, including the Barzah scientific research centre, after a chemical attack in Douma.

== Terrorism and anti-terrorism ==
For many terrorist organizations, chemical weapons might be considered an ideal choice for a mode of attack, if they are available: they are cheap, relatively accessible, and easy to transport. A skilled chemist can readily synthesize most chemical agents if the precursors are available.

In July 1974, a group calling themselves the Aliens of America successfully firebombed the houses of a judge, two police commissioners, and one of the commissioner's cars, burned down two apartment buildings, and bombed the Pan Am Terminal at Los Angeles International Airport, killing three people and injuring eight. The organization, which turned out to be a single resident alien named Muharem Kurbegovic, claimed to have developed and possessed a supply of sarin, as well as four unique nerve agents named AA1, AA2, AA3, and AA4S. Although no agents were found at the time Kurbegovic was arrested in August 1974, he had reportedly acquired "all but one" of the ingredients required to produce a nerve agent. A search of his apartment turned up a variety of materials, including precursors for phosgene and a drum containing 25 pounds of sodium cyanide.

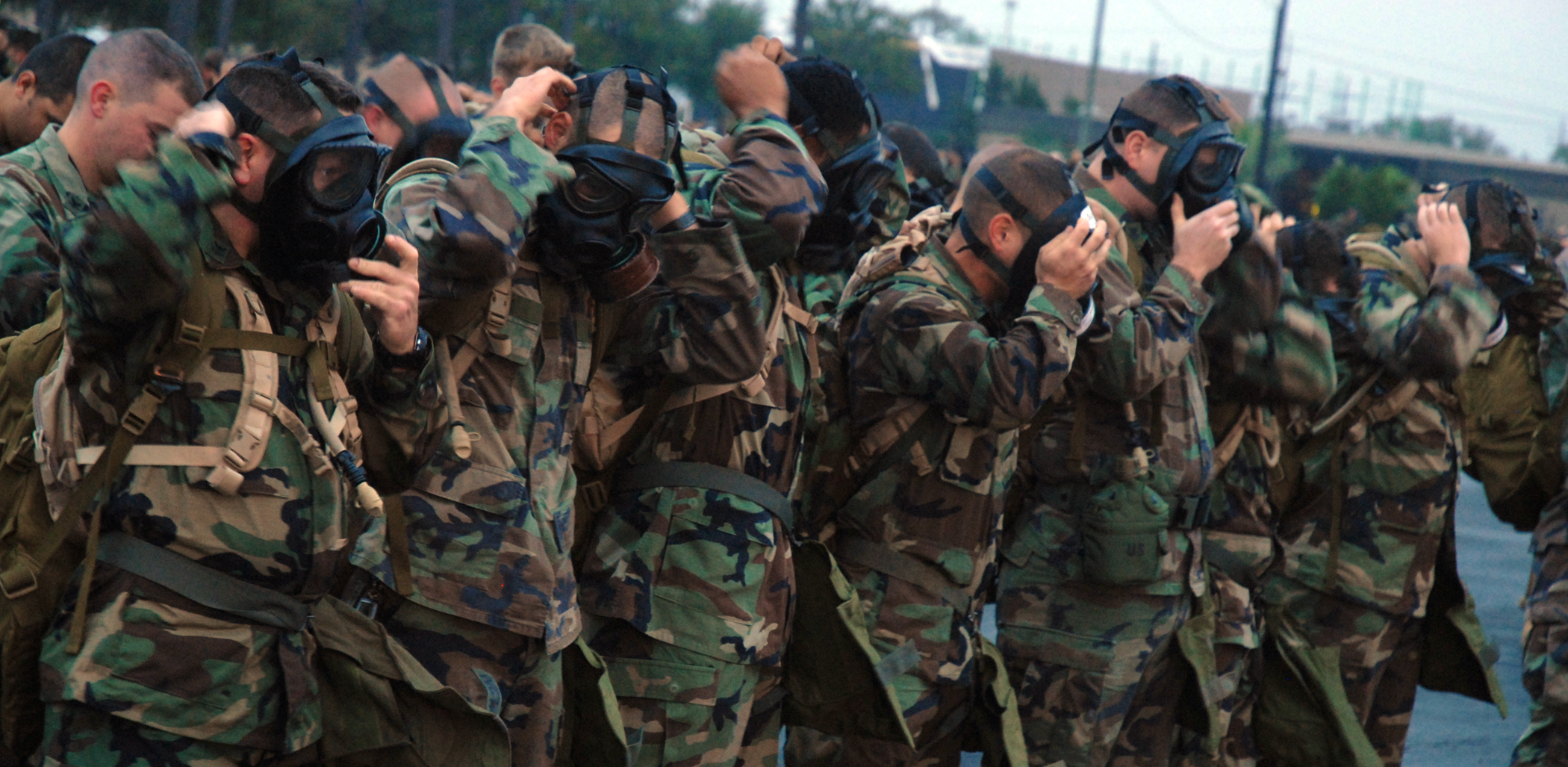
U.S. Navy Seabees don their M40 Field Protective Masks

The first successful use of chemical agents by terrorists against a general civilian population was on June 27, 1994, when Aum Shinrikyo, an apocalyptic group based in Japan that believed it necessary to destroy the planet, released sarin gas in Matsumoto, Japan, killing eight and harming 200. The following year, Aum Shinrikyo released sarin into the Tokyo subway system killing 12 and injuring over 5,000.

On December 29, 1999, four days after Russian forces began an assault of Grozny, Chechen terrorists exploded two chlorine tanks in the town. Because of the wind conditions, no Russian soldiers were injured.

Following the September 11 attacks on the U.S. cities of New York City and Washington, D.C., the organization Al-Qaeda responsible for the attacks announced that they were attempting to acquire radiological, biological, and chemical weapons. This threat was lent a great deal of credibility when a large archive of videotapes was obtained by the cable television network CNN in August 2002 showing, among other things, the killing of three dogs by an apparent nerve agent.

In an anti-terrorist attack on October 26, 2002, Russian special forces used a chemical agent (presumably KOLOKOL-1, an aerosolized fentanyl derivative), as a precursor to an assault on Chechen terrorists, which ended the Moscow theater hostage crisis. All 42 of the terrorists and 120 out of 850 hostages were killed during the raid. Although the use of the chemical agent was justified as a means of selectively targeting terrorists, it killed over 100 hostages.

In early 2007, multiple terrorist bombings had been reported in Iraq using chlorine gas. These attacks wounded or sickened more than 350 people. Reportedly the bombers were affiliated with Al-Qaeda in Iraq, and they have used bombs of various sizes up to chlorine tanker trucks. United Nations Secretary-General Ban Ki-moon condemned the attacks as "clearly intended to cause panic and instability in the country."

== Chemical weapons treaties ==
The Protocol for the Prohibition of the Use in War of Asphyxiating, Poisonous or other Gases, and the Bacteriological Methods of Warfare, or the Geneva Protocol, is an international treaty which prohibits the use of chemical and biological weapons between signatory nations in international armed conflicts. Signed into international law at Geneva on June 17, 1925, and entered into force on February 8, 1928, this treaty states that chemical and biological weapons are "justly condemned by the general opinion of the civilised world."

States parties to the Chemical Weapons Convention in 2015. Light colored territories are those states parties that have declared stockpiles of chemical weapons and/or have known production facilities for chemical weapons.

The most recent arms control agreement in international law, the Convention of the Prohibition of the Development, Production, Stockpiling and Use of Chemical Weapons and on their Destruction, or the Chemical Weapons Convention, outlaws the production, stockpiling, and use of chemical weapons. It is administered by the Organisation for the Prohibition of Chemical Weapons (OPCW), an intergovernmental organisation based in The Hague.

== Bibliography ==
- CBWInfo.com (2001). "A Brief History of Chemical and Biological Weapons: Ancient Times to the 19th Century". Retrieved November 24, 2004.
- Chomsky, Noam (March 4, 2001). "Prospects for Peace in the Middle East", page 2. Lecture.
- Cordette, Jessica, MPH(c) (2003). Chemical Weapons of Mass Destruction. Retrieved November 29, 2004.
- Croddy, Eric (2001). Chemical and Biological Warfare. Copernicus. ISBN 978-0-387-95076-1.
- Fitzgerald, Gerard J. (April 2008). "Chemical Warfare and Medical Response During World War I". American Journal of Public Health. 98 (4): 611. doi:10.2105/AJPH.2007.111930.
- Smart, Jeffery K., M.A. (1997). History of Biological and Chemical Warfare. Retrieved November 24, 2004.
- United States Senate, 103d Congress, 2d Session. (May 25, 1994). The Riegle Report. Retrieved November 6, 2004.
- Гречко, А.А. (1976). Годы Войны. Военное Издательство Министерства Оборонны СССР.Москва.
