= Blakçori =

Blakçori is a surname. Notable people with the surname include:

- Ilir Blakçori (born 1993), Kosovar football left-back
- Muharrem Blakçori, Albanian author and activist
