= Mohammad Naciri =

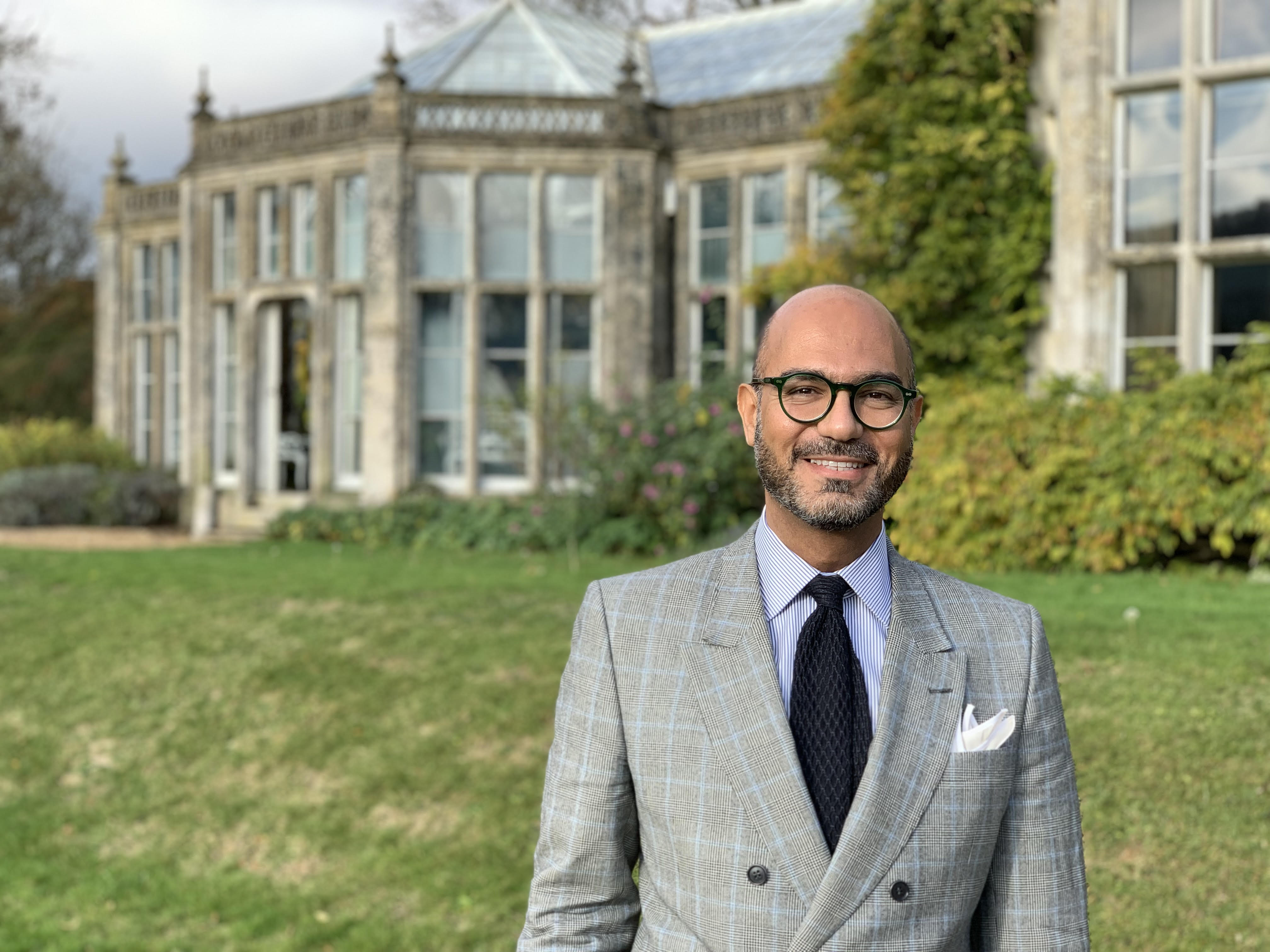
- Naciri at Wilton Park, November, 2018.
- Born: July 31, 1973 (age 53); Rabat, Morocco
- Occupations: Regional director for the two regional: Arab states and Asia Pacific for the United Nations Entity for Gender Equality and the Empowerment of Women (UN Women)

Mohammad Naciri (Arabic: محمد الناصري, born 31 July 1973, romanized: Mḥmd ālnāṣry) is the Chief of Staff for UN Women, the United Nations Entity for Gender Equality and the Empowerment of Women. Prior to his appointment in 2021, he was the Entity's Regional Director for Asia and the Pacific, based in Bangkok, and earlier was the Regional Director for the Middle East and North Africa. He was the first man to hold the positions of Regional Director and Chief of Staff positions in UN Women. A senior United Nations official, Naciri has served with the UN for almost three decades. Prior to his current appointment, he served as deputy regional director, Arab States, UN Women. He belongs to the Naciri family, a long-standing family in Morocco. Naciri has been engaged in addressing cultural and religious norms from a gendered perspective, creating space for partnerships with religious institutions such as Rabita Mohammedia des Oulémas He has spearheaded work on engaging men and boys as agents of change in the region, including through issuing a report on masculinities – the first of its kind in the Arab World. Naciri is a supporter of the arts. He has been supporting young and up and coming artists from the Arab world.

== Early life ==
=== Family ===
Naciri was born in Rabat to a Moroccan father and an Egyptian mother. The Naciri family is a long-standing family in Morocco, whose members have held various positions in government, academia and the judiciary. The Naciri family is notably a large and ancient family of Saharan origin, present everywhere in Morocco. They are affiliated with their ancestor Mohamed Ben Nacer (hence their name) founder of the seventeenth century Sufi following bearing their name to Tamegroute and disciple of Abu Hafs Omar Bin Ahmed Al Ansari who instructed him to inculcate the principles of Tariqa Chadhiliyya.

Notably, Naciri is the grand-nephew of Mohamed El Mekki Naciri, the former Moroccan ambassador to Libya, minister for religious endowments and the owner and chief editor of Al Alam newspaper, former head of Arrabita Al Mohammadia. He is the nephew of Khalid Naciri, the former minister of communication and the spokesperson of the Moroccan government. Naciri is also the first cousin of Salaheddine Mezouar, the former foreign minister of Morocco.

His maternal grandfather is Mohamed Ayoub, a senior member of the Egyptian government, a governor of the Eastern governorate from 1970 to 1975, and a founding member of the new delegation party in 1978.

Naciri's parents were travelling when growing up, he received his primary education in different countries, graduating from high school in the United Arab Emirates.

== Education ==
Naciri has a master's degree in public policy and international development from the Kennedy School of Government, Harvard University (United States) in 1997–1999. He has a second master's degree in social anthropology from the Institute of Social and Cultural Anthropology, University of Oxford (United Kingdom) in 1999-2000 where he was a Chevening scholar, and a third master's degree in business administration from the Arab Academy for Science, Technology & Maritime Transport in Alexandria (Egypt) from 1995 to 1997.

== Career ==
Naciri began his career as an intern with UNICEF, and has since then stayed in the world of development and human rights.

=== UN Women ===
Naciri is an outspoken supporter of women's rights in the region, and the engagement of women in peace processes in particular. Under his leadership, the regional office supported the convening of 45 Yemeni women from different factions to call for an engendered peace process, in his remarks to the meeting, Naciri said, "Yemeni women have an opportunity to contribute in building peace, revitalizing dialogue, and helping Yemen get out from this dark tunnel. We are counting on Yemeni women’s wisdom to create a model that people will follow."

Having been appointed immediately after the Arab spring, much of Naciri's work on gender equality in the region focused on participation and leadership. "We need to look on how can we sustain this participation," Naciri said. "With women, with men, with the country at large, and the government, how can we prove that women's participation is of interest and benefit to the whole society."

Under his leadership, UN Women and United Nations Economic and Social Commission for Western Asia (ESCWA) launched regional research on the costing of violence. He has spearheaded work on engaging men and boys as agents of change in the region, including through issuing a report on masculinities – the first of its kind in the Arab World.

Naciri has worked on expanding both the scope and partnerships of the regional office. A new concept note for a partnership initiative between Union for the Mediterranean (UfM), U.N. Women and the Organisation for Economic Co-operation and Development on Women and ICTs is already under discussion and, according to Naciri, new expertise in this area will definitely be in demand in the future.

Naciri has successfully established several partnerships with bilateral development partners, including the EU MADAD trust fund for Syria response, Swedish International Development Cooperation Agency (SIDA), Finland, Japan and the government of Norway to mention a few.

Naciri has been engaged in addressing cultural and religious norms from a gendered perspective, creating space for partnerships with religious institutions such as Rabita Mohammedia des Oulémas. UN Women under his leadership successfully advocated for the abolishment of laws that gave clemency to rapists if they married their victims in Lebanon, Jordan, Morocco and Tunisia.

==== Dubai Lynx 2015 ====
In 2015 UN Women partnered with Dubai Lynx, the largest regional advertising festival to highlight violence against women, and encouraged young creatives to come up with a video brief on the issue. The regional office shed light on gender taboos through a mother's day campaign which went viral both in the region and beyond. The campaign, highlighting the shame associated with saying one's mother's name, resulted in thousands posting on social media in honor of their mothers.

=== UNDP Yemen ===
From 2009 to 2012, Naciri was the deputy country director of the United Nations Development Programme in Yemen. During this time he managed a comprehensive development portfolio including good governance, poverty alleviation and environmental sustainability in line with UNDP strategic priorities and the Yemen development framework.

=== UNDP Kuwait ===
He was the acting UNDP Kuwait resident representative in 2008–2009, working on, among other things, women's empowerment and witnessing the election of female parliamentarians for the first time in the country's history. He worked on the transparency index, and updating the fiscal policy of the Central Bank of Kuwait. He further worked with Kuwait on the aftermath of the environmental damages caused by the Iraq war through the burning of oil fields.

=== International Organization for Migration ===
Naciri first served with the International Organization For Migration (IOM) as a UN Junior Professional Officer Programme in Cambodia. Here he lobbied for recognition of the human trafficking atrocities taking place in the country, including supporting a public hearing in the US congress in 2003 for the US state department trafficking in persons report. Naciri raised US$10 million for IOMs work on trafficking from the US government as a result of this. Following his time in Cambodia, Naciri was appointed as chief of mission for IOM in Kuwait and tasked with establishing IOMs mission in country. During this time he worked closely with Kuwaiti authorities to include domestic workers under the labor code. Naciri was also in charge of IOMs Southern Iraq response from Kuwait. He was also the deputy director for the out of country voting for Iraq during the 2005 elections. In 2006, during the Lebanon war, Naciri was seconded to be the IOM emergency coordinator.

== Personal Endeavors ==
1. Naciri is a supporter of the arts. In 2008, he was cited by Canvas Magazine, Volume 4, Issue 3 in May–June 2008 as one of the youngest patrons of Middle Eastern art. He has been supporting young and up and coming artists from the Arab world. He was also featured in the Financial Times profile of his personal art collection and how it relates to his women's rights activism.
2. In 2001, he was featured with an article in Katya Traboulsi's book "Des Autres/Of Others" in which he wrote about the relationship between art and people.
3. In April 2018, Naciri gave a TED X talk on being a Male, Muslim, Arab Feminist at Sciences PO Menton campus. In May 2018, Naciri spoke at Oxford University on women's empowerment in the Gulf Cooperation Council (GCC).
4. In 2016, Naciri spearheaded the IIFMENA conference, including closing remarks and the launching of the Sharjah declaration.
5. In 2017, Naciri and UN Women in partnership with Promundo launched the first regional research on masculinities.
6. In November 2015, Naciri and six other high-profile personalities performed an internationally acclaimed documentary play, SEVEN, for the first time in Cairo.
7. Naciri is an international jury member of the Global award of Women's Empowerment, to be awarded in March 2019.
8. In June 2018, he was a speaker at POLITICO.
9. In October 2018, he was on the board of Arab Woman Awards 2018, Kuwait.
10. In November 2018, he was the Columbia European Society and GEG Columbia guest lecturer on EU Involvement in Arab Female Empowerment.
11. Naciri was a member of the Blues rowing team while at Oxford and is a black belt Shotokan Karate practitioner. He was a member of the Rotaract from 1992 to 1999. From 1993 to 1997 he was a member of AIESEC.

== Publications ==
Naciri has been featured in several publications, notably around women's rights.

- In May 2018 he was featured in Gulf Affairs.
- In February 2018, he co-authored an op-ed calling for the importance of an inclusive peace process in Yemen.
- In 2017, The Union for the Mediterranean interviewed him.
