= Muharrem Uz =

Turkish footballer (born 1980)

Personal information
- Date of birth: 10 December 1980 (age 45)
- Place of birth: Herne, Germany
- Height: 1.78 m (5 ft 10 in)
- Position: Midfielder

Team information
- Current team: Nigde Belediyespor

Senior career*
Years	Team	Apps	(Gls)
2001–2002	Kayseri Erciyesspor		
2002–2003	Gaziantepspor	14	(0)
2003–2004	Malatyaspor	9	(0)
2004–2005	Elazığspor	26	(4)
2006	Sivasspor	4	(1)
2006–2009	SV Yeşilyurt	24	(7)
2008	Adana Demirspor	4	
2008	Çorumspor	15	(4)
2010	FC Zhetysu	4	(0)
2010–2011	Tokatspor	20	(1)
2011	Bozüyükspor	8	(0)
2012	Denizli Belediyespor	3	(0)
2013–	Nigde Belediyespor		
- * Club domestic league appearances and goals

Muharrem Uz (born 10 December 1980) is a footballer who plays as a midfielder for side Nigde Belediyespor.

Uz began his professional career by signing a one-year contract with TFF First League club Kayseri Erciyesspor in August 2001. Next, he would join Gaziantepspor and Malatyaspor, playing in a total of 23 Süper Lig matches for the clubs. He joined Kazakhstan Premier League side FC Zhetysu in March 2010, but would leave the club in July 2010.
