= Naciri =

Naciri (Arabic: الناصري) is a Moroccan Arabic surname. Notable people with the surname include:

- Mohamed El Mekki Naciri
- Ahmad ibn Khalid an-Nasiri, Moroccan historian
- Junas Naciri (born 1973), Dutch retired footballer
- Khalid Naciri (born 1946), Moroccan politician
- Mohammad Naciri (born 1973), Moroccan United Nations official
- Mohamed Taieb Naciri (1939–2012), Moroccan lawyer and politician
- Said Naciri (born 1960), Moroccan actor, comedian and producer
- Youssef Naciri (born 1993), Moroccan footballer
- Hassan Naciri, Moroccan public figure.
