= 1974 Los Angeles International Airport bombing =

Terrorist incident in the United States

Coordinates: 33.946260°N 118.404079°W

1974 Los Angeles International Airport Bombing
- Location: Los Angeles, California
- Date: August 6, 1974
- Target: Los Angeles International Airport
- Attack type: Bombing
- Deaths: 3
- Injuries: 36
- Perpetrator: Muharem Kurbegovic

The 1974 Los Angeles International Airport bombing occurred on August 6, 1974, in the overseas passenger terminal lobby of Pan American World Airways (now Terminal 3) at the Los Angeles International Airport. The attack killed three people and injured 36 others.

The attack was perpetrated by 37-year-old Yugoslavian immigrant Muharem Kurbegovic, who was arrested two weeks after the bombing. Kurbegovic was eventually found guilty of first-degree murder for committing the bombing and an additional attack. He was sentenced to life in prison.

== Attack ==
The bomb exploded at 8:10 AM inside a locker. There were about 50 people in the airport lobby at the time of the explosion. The terminal was evacuated after the blast. The explosion ripped through 100 feet (30 m) of the lobby.

Three people died as a result of the attack, with two victims dying at the scene and an additional victim dying later at the hospital. Thirty-six people were injured in the attack, including a priest who lost a leg. Those killed in the bombing were 46-year-old Leonard Hsu of Lomita, 64-year-old Harper Glass of Inglewood, and 53-year-old Robert Moncur of New Zealand.

Kurbegovic was nicknamed "The Alphabet Bomber" because of his alleged plan to attack places in an order that would make an anagram of Aliens of America. He later disputed this and stated that his objective was to "undermine and erode the foundation of Western Civilization, which is the Holy Bible".

In August 1987, Kurbegovic was denied parole.

== See also ==
- Domestic terrorism in the United States
