= Mohamed Ali al-Nasiri =

Dr Mohamed Ali al-Nasiri

Personal details
- Born: 1 July 1944 Nasiriyah – Dhi Qar Governorate, Iraq
- Party: Islamic Dawa Party
- Occupation: Historian, Author & Academic
- Profession: Author

Hajj Dr Mohamed Ali al-Nasiri (born 1 July 1944) is an Arabic journalist, author and academic based in the United Kingdom. His father was Sheikh Abbas of the Al-Juaber tribal confederation.

== Biography ==
Born in Nasiriyah in 1944, al-Nasiri is an Arab scholar, author and journalist of Shiite descent. In his published works he has dealt with a range of subject areas, but particularly Arabic literature, language and history and Islamic studies. He is currently a member of the Islamic Dawa Party of Iraq in the United Kingdom and has worked for BBC, Al-jazeera, Sawt al-Iraq, International Colleges of Islamic Sciences.

He completed first and secondary level education in Nasiriyah in Iraq. He then went on to study at the Al-Fiqh college in Najaf. In 1970 he graduated with a bachelor's degree in Arabic language and Islamic sciences.

After working as a secondary school teacher in both Algeria and Iraq for twenty years he went on to complete his master's degree in the philosophy of Islamic Law in London in 1999 before completing his Doctorate in Islamic Studies in 2002.

Amongst his many published works and books are French Politics in the Middle East (1984) and France in Algeria (1984) and the editing of the core Islamic Beliefs by the late Sheikh Abbas Al-Nasiri(2004).

He has often been invited to speak at debates and seminars around the world and edited on numerous occasions the magazine Sawt al-Iraq which was based in London and had been in print for nearly 20 years.

== Bibliography ==
- French Politics in the Middle East (1984)
- France in Algeria (1984)
