= Juan Pando =

Spanish historian (born 1943)

Juan Pando Despierto (born in Madrid, 1943) is a Spanish historian.

Juan Pando was born within a family of military background. He is the son of the photographer Juan Pando Barrero. He received a triple formation, not only historical and military but a professional photographer. His thesis El mundo militar a través de la fotografía: España y el hecho internacional 1861-1921: Valores estéticos, sociológicos y políticos, enabled him to obtain his doctorate.

He is also an author in the field of photography. The Pando Files are preserved today at the Spanish Institute of Historical Inheritance.
