= Muharem Kurbegovic =

Yugoslav–American domestic terrorist

- Born: June 1, 1943 (age 83); Sarajevo, Independent State of Croatia, Yugoslavia
- Other names: Isaac Rasim; Alphabet Bomber
- Occupation: Aerospace engineer
- Motive: Revenge against judicial officials for a prior arrest; Repealment of all laws pertaining to immigration, naturalization, and sex; Anti-Western sentiment (claimed)
- Convictions: 25 counts of murder, arson, attempted murder, possession of explosives, and exploding a bomb
- Penalty: Life imprisonment

Details
- Span of crimes: 1973–1974
- Killed: 3
- Injured: 36
- Date apprehended: August 20, 1974

Muharem Kurbegovic (born June 1, 1943) is a Yugoslav–American aerospace engineer and domestic terrorist who was convicted for committing a string of lone wolf arsons and bombings in Los Angeles, California in 1973 and 1974, his most notable act being the 1974 Los Angeles International Airport bombing that killed three people and injured 36 others.

Under the alias "Isaac Rasim", Kurbegovic's attacks began with targeted arsons relating to a personal vendetta against judicial officials for a criminal charge, eventually escalating into demands to repeal laws relating to immigration, naturalization, and sex; he also claimed his motive was to "undermine and erode the foundation of Western Civilization, which is the Holy Bible". After the airport bombing, Kurbegovic was nicknamed the "Alphabet Bomber" because of his stated plan to bomb locations in an order that would spell an anagram of his nonexistent terrorist group "Aliens of America" ("A" for airport, "L" for locker, etc.).

After a two-week investigation following the airport bombing that involved numerous mostly-unfounded bomb threats, the potential use of nerve gas against high-rise towers and the United States Congress, and an alleged assassination plot targeting President Gerald Ford, Kurbegovic was arrested in 1974 and was sentenced to life imprisonment in 1980.

== Early life ==
Kurbegovic was born in Sarajevo in occupied Yugoslavia on June 1, 1943. He studied engineering in Europe before emigrating to Los Angeles through Canada in January 1967, where he found work in the aerospace industry, regularly changing roles and companies in the course of his work. He pretended to be a deaf-mute to dodge the draft during the Vietnam War, communicating at work through written notes, and was generally well-respected by his colleagues.

Kurbegovic was a regular at taxi dance halls in Los Angeles, and was arrested in such a venue on March 24, 1971, by an undercover Los Angeles Police Department (LAPD) officer for allegedly masturbating in a bathroom. At his trial in the Los Angeles County Superior Court, Kurbegovic successfully defended himself by "point[ing] out the physical impossibility of masturbating on the toilet seat where he was arrested", and he was found not guilty. Despite his acquittal, Kurbegovic's arrest severely impacted his life: he was fired from his aerospace job, leaving him unemployed for a year before finding work in manufacturing; his chances of gaining American citizenship were jeopardized and he was at risk of deportation; and when he applied to open his own dance hall, the LAPD denied his required police permit citing his criminal record, a ruling that the Los Angeles Board of Police Commissioners, the LAPD's civilian oversight board, upheld.

The lasting consequences of his arrest led to Kurbegovic developing a personal vendetta against judicial officials, namely the municipal court judge who oversaw his trial and the police commissioners who denied his permit appeal. He strongly disdained American laws relating to immigration, naturalization, and sex, which he viewed as being responsible for his predicament, and sought to have them repealed. He was also angered by the 1970 shootings of two Mexican resident aliens by two LAPD officers, allegedly by mistake, and wanted the officers to be arrested and charged for the incident.

== Arsons and bombings ==
In the early morning of November 9, 1973, Kurbegovic planted incendiary devices at three residences, each roughly a 19-minute drive from each other. They were the homes of Allan G. Campbell, the municipal court judge who had presided over Kurbegovic's lewd conduct trial in 1971, and Marguerite Justice and Emmet McGaughey, the police commissioners who had denied Kurbegovic's permit appeal. All three were awakened by the fires and were not harmed, and the fires were put out quickly.

In June 1974, McGaughey, the president of the Board of Police Commissioners, received two suspicious phone calls, the first being nothing but breathing, and the second being a death threat allegedly from the Symbionese Liberation Army (SLA) that claimed he would be killed within 30 days. That month, an incendiary car bomb planted in the gas tank of McGaughey's car detonated, destroying it, but McGaughey himself was not harmed.

On July 4, 1974, arson fires burned three apartment buildings in the Greater Los Angeles area, one in Santa Monica and two in Marina del Rey. No one is known to have been harmed in the fires. KFWB, an all-news radio station, received a phone call from Kurbegovic identifying himself as Isaac Rasim, an SLA "field commander", who claimed responsibility for the fires; the call came either before or after the apartment bombings. The next day, a security guard at Times Mirror Square discovered a cassette tape addressed to the Los Angeles Times hidden in a planter, in which Kurbegovic, now portraying Isaac as the leader of the militant group "Aliens of America", claimed he had mailed nine postcards to each of the U.S. Supreme Court justices, each containing a tiny lead disk under the stamp that held a vial of a nerve agent. Said postcards, purportedly from Bob Hope, had already been intercepted on June 16 at the Palm Springs post office, when a cancelling machine accidentally broke the disks, causing them to get caught in the machine. Kurbegovic would later admit in another tape that the postcard plot was a fluke and that the chemicals in the disks were harmless, but noted the terror the threat had fueled among the public. Kurbegovic would continue to send cassette tapes to various news outlets and make numerous assorted threats until he was caught.

On August 6, at around 8:10 am, a bomb placed by Kurbegovic inside a coin-operated public locker in the Pan Am lobby of the Los Angeles International Airport exploded, killing 3 people and injuring 36 others. That night, Conrad Casler, city editor for the Los Angeles Herald Examiner, received a phone call from Kurbegovic in which he claimed responsibility in the name of Aliens of America, and confirmed his identity by correctly identifying the bomb's locker number as "T 225"—information that had not yet been made public. Kurbegovic sent a cassette tape to a Los Angeles-area CBS affiliate in which he threatened further bombings against other targets, the names of which would spell "ALIENS OF AMERICA", the airport being the first "A". The extent of Kurbegovic's communications with Casler are not clear: news retrospectives claim he only spoke briefly with Casler and stopped after investigators wiretapped Casler's phone, but a 1982 court appeal claimed he continued to call Casler over several days.

On August 16, at around 9:00 pm, Kurbegovic sent a newspaper a cassette tape warning officials he had placed an explosive in a locker ("L") at a Greyhound Lines station in Downtown Los Angeles. The LAPD's bomb squad evacuated 1,000 people in and around the Greyhound station and found a 25-pound satchel charge, the most powerful explosive they had handled up to that time, in locker 625. Using a rudimentary pulley system, the bomb squad managed to extract the charge and safely dispose of it at a bomb range. In the tape, Kurbegovic also threatened both another attack for the letter "I", as well as a sarin attack targeting the United States Capitol.

== Investigation and arrest ==
Early investigations into Kurbegovic's arsons had no notable progression. As Kurbegovic's lewd conduct case was extremely minor and had occurred over a year prior, investigators reasonably did not consider a connection between Kurbegovic and the arsons.

After the LAX bombing, the LAPD conducted a more thorough investigation, assembling a task force of 1,000 officers tasked with investigating and capturing the Alphabet Bomber, assisted by the Federal Bureau of Investigation and the Bureau of Alcohol, Tobacco, Firearms and Explosives. Listening to the collection of tapes sent by "Isaac Rasim", linguists deduced he was from Southeast Europe, while investigators noticed he had admitted to the November 1973 arsons in a tape from August 12, 1974, in which he also alluded to the sentencing of an "innocent alien". Reappraisals of Campbell, Justice, and McGaughey's records to include acquittals and resident aliens found seven connections, including one individual, Kurbegovic, who Justice and McGaughey had made negative comments about regarding his moral character.

With the investigation now centered on Kurbegovic, the LAPD began questioning witnesses and people associated with him. Several of Kurbegovic's coworkers alerted police to suspicious and concerning behavior on his part, such as a colleague from Dynatech who recalled Kurbegovic asking him how he would "undertake a scheme to demand $10 million after setting off a bomb, in exchange for not setting off a second". Investigators also learned the Greyhound bomb used a tank of a type frequently used by Dynatech, and that Kurbegovic had managed to acquire explosive chemicals by stealing them from his manufacturing workplace and posing as a representative of Hughes Aircraft Company to order them directly from chemical companies. Kurbegovic was quickly identified as the Alphabet Bomber.

On August 20, an LAPD surveillance operation caught Kurbegovic leaving a cassette tape in the washroom of a Carl's Jr. restaurant; when Kurbegovic returned to the restaurant's washroom shortly after, an LAPD officer followed him in and arrested him without incident. In custody, Kurbegovic alternated between acting deaf-mute and speaking, and continued to make several unfounded threats, such as a bomb allegedly planted among the thermonuclear weapons at a United States Air Force installation.

Investigators searching Kurbegovic's apartment discovered assembled pipe bombs, assorted bomb-making paraphernalia, and receipts for chemicals addressed to Hughes Aircraft. Also in the apartment was approximately 25 pounds of potassium cyanide and nitric acid that Kurbegovic planned to use to create cyanide gas that he would pump into the air conditioning ducts of high-rise towers, per a threat he had made shortly after the LAX bombings, but the stockpile was reportedly so well-hidden that detectives did not find them until Kurbegovic told officials about the chemicals in 1976. Reportedly, Kurbegovic possessed every ingredient necessary to create an actual lethal nerve agent except a certain organic phosphate that he had already ordered which, at the time of his arrest, had arrived in Los Angeles and was waiting for pickup.

=== Alleged presidential threat ===
According to chemical weapons experts Neil C. Livingstone and Joseph D. Douglass in their 1984 paper CBW: The Poor Man's Atomic Bomb, as well as LAPD Detective Arleigh McCree, in mid-August 1974 Kurbegovic stated he would travel to Washington, D.C. to assassinate newly sworn-in President Gerald Ford and outgoing President Richard Nixon with a nerve agent that he proceeded to describe in detail, leading to the United States Secret Service and the Central Intelligence Agency joining the investigation. Working out of the White House basement, federal investigators conducted an intensive manhunt, and after extensive psychological profiling, database searches, and tape recording analyses using CIA audio forensics equipment, Kurbegovic was allegedly identified within 18 hours of federal involvement, although the rest of the investigation was conducted primarily by the LAPD. Kurbegovic was supposedly never charged with threatening the president because prosecutors believed the charges already filed against him were severe enough to ensure a harsh sentence on their own. The Secret Service requested the threats not be publicized to avoid potential copycats. However, these claims were not repeated in any other news articles and official reports on the Alphabet Bomber manhunt, and the Secret Service officially denied their involvement in the investigation.

== Trial and conviction ==
In November 1974, Kurbegovic asked to be deported, but the court rejected his request. His trial was delayed for years on grounds of mental incompetence. At his trial, Kurbegovic chose to defend himself and frequently exhibited odd behaviors such as claiming to be the Messiah and having outbursts at the judge and prosecutors. In October 1980, after an eight-month trial, Kurbegovic was convicted of 25 counts of murder, arson, attempted murder, possession of explosives, and exploding a bomb. In November 1980, Kurbegovic was sentenced to life in prison.

Kurbegovic was frequently moved around to different mental institutions and high-security prisons; in 1985 he was held in San Quentin Rehabilitation Center, and in 2003 he was held in Pelican Bay State Prison. In August 1987, Kurbegovic was denied parole, after claiming he was infected with AIDS by prison officials. In 2002, he filed a writ in the Superior Court of California claiming he had "been a member of the Al-Qaida terrorist organization since 1963", despite the group not existing until 1988. In September 2008, he was again denied parole.

== See also ==
- Domestic terrorism in the United States
