= Moharam Khan Nasiri =

Afghan politician

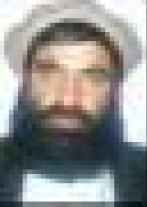
- Occupation: Member of the Meshrano Jirga
- Title: Hajji

Hajji Moharam Khan Nasiri is a member of the Meshrano Jirga, the upper house of Afghanistan's National Assembly, for Laghman Province. He is the secretary of the Rules Committee.
