= Muharrem Blakçori =

Albanian author and activist

Muharrem Blakçori (1894–1968) was an Albanian author and activist known for having translated the first Albanian language version of the Quran.
