= Our Guys in Salisbury =

2018 Russian board game

- Designers: Mikhail Bober
- Publishers: Igroland
- Publication: December 2018; 7 years ago
- Genres: Board game
- Players: 2
- Chance: High (dice rolling)

Our Guys in Salisbury (Russian: Наши в Солсбери) is a Russian board game that depicts the route of Anatoliy Chepiga and Alexander Mishkin from Moscow to the 2018 Salisbury poisoning of Sergei and Yulia Skripal. The game was designed in November 2018 by Mikhail Bober, and released under the brand name Igroland shortly before Christmas that year. It reached international headlines in January 2019 due to its "poor taste" and "disregard" for the victims of the attack.

The game was released in a pack of six other games; Zooworld, Tank Battle, Big Races, The Unbelievable Cosmic Journey and World of Fairytales, allegedly available for 49 roubles on the website of Yekaterinburg-based retailer GalaMart. 5,000 copies of the game were printed in December 2018, which allegedly sold out soon after its release.

== Gameplay and design ==
Players begin the game with their pieces on the Moscow space. Throughout the game, players roll dice to move through various cities visited by the two suspects, including Minsk, Tel Aviv, Geneva, Paris, Amsterdam and London. To win, players must reach Salisbury with the most points.

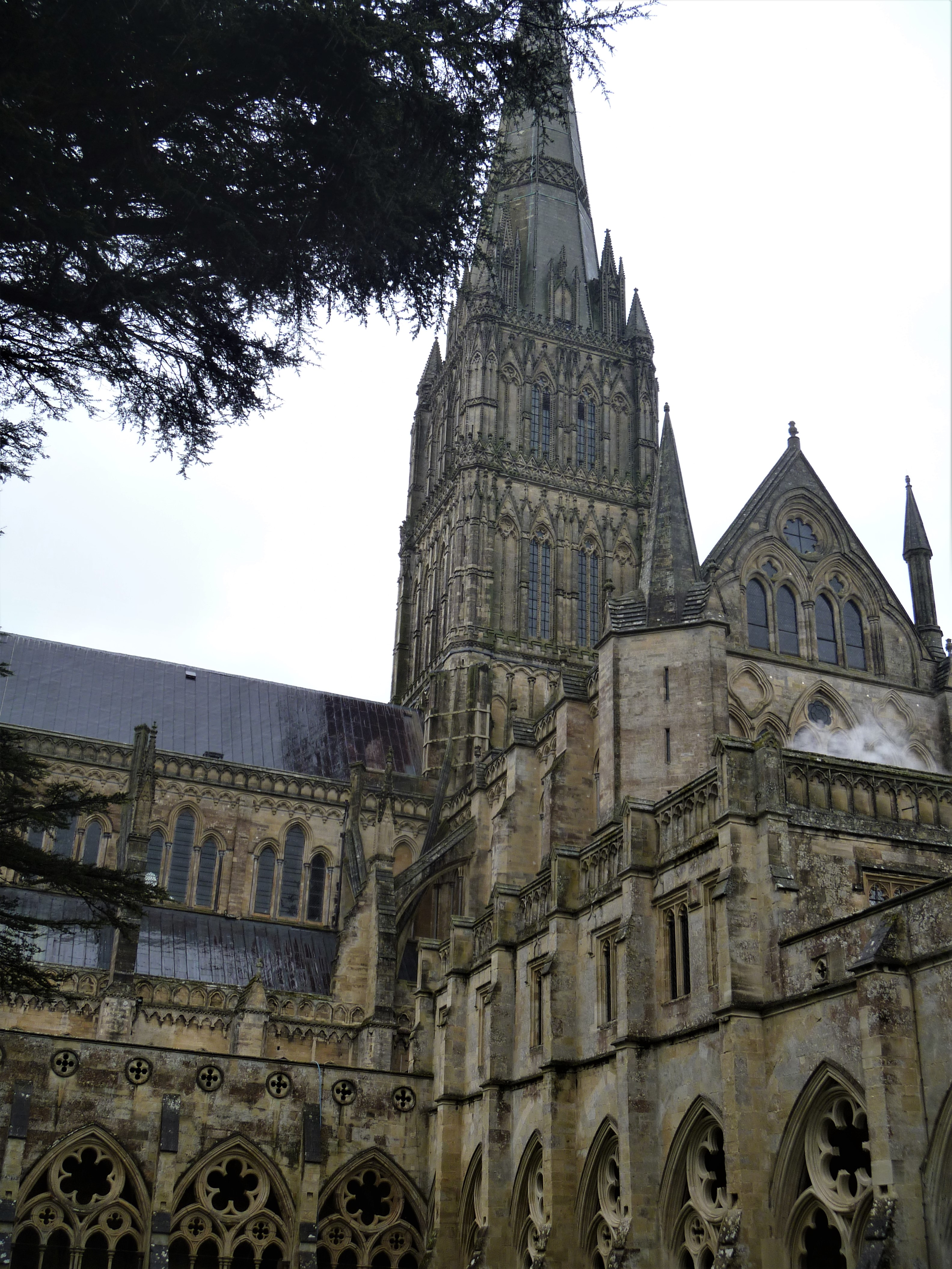
Salisbury Cathedral in 2018

Salisbury is decorated on the game's board with a picture of Salisbury Cathedral in crosshairs, below two figures in hazmat suits taken from photographs of the police response to the poisoning. A spray bottle depicting a green skull and crossbones is depicted on the bottom left of the board, which The Guardian and Euronews stated was a reference to the perfume bottle containing the similar Novichok nerve agent which killed Dawn Sturgess in the Amesbury poisonings months after the Salisbury incident. Anatoliy Chepiga and Alexander Mishkin, the suspects in the poisoning, are depicted in the bottom right of the board.

In an interview, designer Bober stated that the game was intended as an "answer to western media: enough already. To us it’s not funny any more. It’s sad. This needs to stop." He said he also meant the game as "a kind of joke, and a bridge of friendship," and that "we wanted to support our countrymen who might be offended by this situation" as "a lot of things are said and a lot of it without any proof." He also told TV Rain that the game was a "humorous response" to British allegations which he said came from "Russophobia".

== Reception ==
Upon the first reports and images of the game, doubts were cast on whether it really existed. Dmitry Kolezev, a Russian journalist, published an early photograph of the game's box in November 2018 with the caption "I can’t understand, is this photoshop or not?" It was later also discovered by Reuters reporter Polina Ivanova, prompting more speculation on whether it was real.

Jo Broom, the former Mayor of Salisbury, stated that the game was a "kick in the teeth," and that it "shows a shocking disregard really for all those that have been involved in the tragedy last year." Matthew Rowley, the brother of Amesbury poisoning victim Charlie Rowley, called for the game to be withdrawn from sale and for its developers to be fined. The Guardian stated that the game "reflects how the response to the Salisbury poisonings in particular have been treated as something of a joke in Russia"
