= Denis Sergeev (GRU officer) =

Russian officer of military intelligence service GRU

- Born: 1973 (age 52–53); Kazahkstan
- Other name: Sergej Fedotov

Denis Vyacheslavovich Sergeev, who goes by the alias of Sergej Fedotov in Europe (born 1973 in Usharal, Kazakhstan) is a Russian officer of military intelligence service GRU. He is suspected to have been the local coordinator of the poisoning of Sergei and Yulia Skripal 2018 in the UK and the 2015 poisoning of Bulgarian arms dealer Emilian Gebrev in Sofia.

== Career ==
Denis Sergeev is a member of Russian military intelligence service GRU. Investigative group Bellingcat wrote that Sergeev's rank in the organisation "was no lower than colonel, and possibly Lt. General or Major General."

Sergeev was born in 1973 in a military settlement in the Kazakh Soviet Socialist Republic and did his military service in the southern Russian port of Novorossiisk. Later he graduated from the Russian Diplomatic Military Academy in Moscow, also known as the "GRU Conservatory", where military intelligence trains its cadres.

=== Involvement in GRU operations in Europe ===
Sergeev was involved in the establishment of a total of eight companies between 2004 and 2012, which were opened and later liquidated. He was shareholder or managing director; at times other suspected GRU officers were involved in the companies. The purpose of these companies, whose names imitate larger Russian companies, is unclear. NZZ speculated, that they may have been used to launder money or as a fictitious employer to GRU employees. Sergeyev got a personal bank loan of about one million USD, the purpose of which remains unknown.

=== Poisoning of Emil Gebrev ===
One of the aliases of Sergeev, "Sergei Fedotov", was on a Russian passport used in Bulgaria at the time of the Novichok poisoning of Emil Gebrev, a Sofia arms dealer. The poisoning was acute.

Investigative group Bellingcat teamed up with investigative journalists at German daily Der Spiegel to report in November 2019 on Sergeev's possible involvement in a poison attack on the Bulgarian arms manufacturer Emilian Gebrev in the spring of 2015. The Bulgarian Prosecutor General's Office has confirmed the presence of Sergeev during the period of the attack but the investigation was shuttered by July 2019, amid Gebrev's claims of cowardice.

Three individuals including Sergeev were charged in absentia by the Bulgarians with attempted murder "by intoxication with an unidentified phosphorus-organic substance" in January 2020. The substance used to poison the three Bulgarians may have been a banned pesticide called Amiton, known in Russia as Tetram. Curiously, as of January 2020, there was no record of written communication between officials in Bulgaria and the OPCW in this matter.

=== Poisoning of Sergei and Yulia Skripal ===
In February 2019, Bellingcat confirmed that a third Russian GRU officer was present in the United Kingdom when the Skripals' were poisoned by Novichok in March 2018. In September 2021, Bellingcat revealed Sergeev's identity and wrote that he was "a high-ranking GRU officer". Furthermore, Bellingcat established that "Russian authorities have taken the unusual measure of erasing any public records" of Sergeev's existence, as well as the other two main suspects in the Skripal poisoning.

Sergeev is said to have had a senior position to the executing GRU-agents Chepiga and Mishkin in the Skripal poisoning operation. He was likely in charge of coordinating the operation in Salisbury.
