= 2025 GRU Exposure in Prague =

The 2025 GRU exposure in Prague concerned a Russian influence operation uncovered by the Czech Security Information Service (BIS) involving Belarusian journalist Natalia Sudliankova (Shevko) (Belarusian: Натальля Судлянкова (Шевко); born 9 June 1964).

On 2 April 2025, BIS said that Sudliankova had worked for several Russian state-linked organisations and that, from 2021, her activities were directed and financed by GRU officer Alexey Shavrov. The Czech government placed Sudliankova and Shavrov on its national sanctions list and required her to leave the country. In May 2025, the European Union also sanctioned her, stating that she had cooperated with Russian entities including Rosatom, Pravfond and the Immortal Regiment.

In August 2026, the Municipal Court in Prague upheld the Czech sanctions against Sudliankova, finding that classified intelligence supported claims that she had been tasked and paid by Shavrov and other Russian-linked actors.

== Background ==
Russian intelligence officers have operated in the Czech Republic under diplomatic cover for many years. In 2021, Czech authorities attributed the 2014 Vrbětice ammunition warehouse explosions to members of the Russian military intelligence service, the GRU. The Czech government subsequently expelled 18 Russian embassy employees identified as officers of the GRU and Russia's Foreign Intelligence Service (SVR), and substantially reduced the size of the Russian diplomatic mission in Prague. The Czech Security Information Service (BIS) later said that Russia's reduced intelligence presence under diplomatic cover increased its reliance on local collaborators.

Sudliankova, a Belarusian journalist and opponent of Belarusian president Alexander Lukashenko, left Belarus with her family in 1999 and was granted political asylum in the Czech Republic. Belarusian authorities later sought her extradition in connection with criminal charges brought against her in Belarus. In 2002, a Czech court rejected a Belarusian request for her extradition, finding the charges against her to be without merit.

Sudliankova subsequently worked in Czech and Russian-language media. She was an editor with the Belarusian service of Radio Free Europe/Radio Liberty and contributed to Týden, Lidové noviny, E15 and the Russian newspaper Izvestia. She also became editor-in-chief of Pražský Telegraf, a Russian-language newspaper published in Prague. By the early 2010s, she had also become involved in Czech–Russian business and public-relations activities.

Her activities increasingly extended into the energy sector and organisations promoting Czech–Russian commercial relations. Sudliankova served on the chamber's presidium of the Russian-Czech Chamber of Commerce, and the public-relations agency Essential Communication, with which she was associated, had a long-standing relationship with the Russian state nuclear corporation Rosatom.

Her public commentary also became more favourable towards Russian positions following the Russian annexation of Crimea in 2014. In an interview she rejected the characterization of the war in eastern Ukraine as a Russian–Ukrainian conflict and said that Russian forces were not fighting there.

== Russian-linked activities ==
=== Rosatom and Atominfo.cz ===
During the 2010s, Sudliankova became increasingly involved in public-relations work connected with Rosatom. She was associated with the Prague-based agency Essential Communication, which worked for Rosatom and organised media and promotional activities related to the company's interests in the Czech Republic.

Sudliankova was also associated with Atominfo.cz, a Czech-language website specialising in nuclear energy. The domain was registered to PR-aspekt International, the company that also published Pražský Telegraf and Atominfo published specialist reporting on nuclear technology.

In 2020, Atominfo.cz had contacted Czech lawmakers and sought to organise a conference on nuclear energy shortly before a parliamentary committee was due to discuss the participation of Russian and Chinese companies in the planned expansion of the Dukovany Nuclear Power Station. The Czech Ministry of the Interior later cited the episode as an example of Russian influence activity.

=== Pražský Telegraf and Pravfond ===
Sudliankova was editor-in-chief of the Prague-based Russian-language newspaper Pražský Telegraf, which was published by PR-aspekt International. From 2015, the newspaper received grants from Pravfond, a Russian state-backed foundation established to support Russian citizens and compatriots abroad.

Members of Sudliankova's family were also involved in the organisations behind her media and public-relations activities. Her husband, Mikhail Tchepeliv, managed PR-aspekt International and, together with his son submitted Pravfond grant applications on behalf of Pražský Telegraf. Sudliankova's son Alexei Chevko was the sole shareholder and managing director of PR-aspekt from 2009 to 2014. Her daughter Anastasia Čepelova became the sole owner of Essential Communication in 2020; the agency had previously provided public-relations services for Rosatom.

=== Russian-Czech organisations ===
Sudliankova was also active in organisations directly promoting Russian business interests in the Czech Republic. She served on the presidium of the Russian-Czech Chamber of Commerce (RČSOK) which, established in 2012, brought together Czech and Russian companies and included Russian state-linked businesses such as Rusatom Overseas. Her husband, Mikhail Tchepeliv, joined the board of RČSOK in August 2021.

== GRU-directed activities ==
According to the Czech Security Information Service (BIS), Sudliankova's activities in 2021 and 2022 were directed and financed by GRU officer Alexey Shavrov. Acting on his instructions, she arranged the publication of several articles in Czech media, mostly in the form of interviews. BIS said that the articles included criticism of a Czech non-governmental organisation in 2021 and criticism of assistance to Ukraine in 2022.

BIS reported that Sudliankova received payments through an intermediary in cryptocurrency, amounting to tens of thousands of euros. It described her as one of the most active long-term collaborators of Russian intelligence officers operating in the Czech Republic under diplomatic cover.

In 2024, Sudliankova was also involved in a separate influence campaign connected to sanctioned Russian businessman Alisher Usmanov. BIS said that an employee of USM Holding coordinated and financed the publication of articles in several European countries questioning the legitimacy of European Union sanctions against Usmanov. The European Union later stated that Sudliankova had also cooperated with Russian organisations including Rosatom, Pravfond and the Immortal Regiment.

== Exposure and sanctions ==
On 2 April 2025, the Czech government placed Sudliankova and GRU officer Alexey Shavrov on the national sanctions list following an investigation by the Security Information Service (BIS). Czech authorities described Sudliankova as a collaborator of Russian military intelligence and said that her activities had been financed from Russia.

The sanctions froze their assets and barred them from entering the Czech Republic. Sudliankova, who was living in the country at the time, was given 30 days to leave. She left the country on 1 May 2025 and later confirmed that she was in Moscow. The Czech government also proposed that Sudliankova and Shavrov be added to the European Union sanctions list and the EU proceeded on 20 May 2025.

The case drew attention to a gap in Czech criminal law concerning activities conducted on behalf of foreign powers. A new offence of "unauthorised activity on behalf of a foreign power" entered into force in February 2025. Interior Minister Vít Rakušan said that, had the provision applied to her earlier conduct, Czech authorities could have considered criminal prosecution rather than only her removal from the country.

== Legal challenge ==
Sudliankova challenged her inclusion on the Czech national sanctions list at the Municipal Court in Prague, which reviewed classified intelligence material submitted in support of the government's decision.

In August 2026, the court rejected her challenge and upheld the sanctions. According to the judgment, classified documents showed that Sudliankova had been tasked and paid by GRU officer Alexey Shavrov and by an employee of USM Holdings. The court found that the intelligence material was sufficiently detailed and mutually corroborating to support the government's conclusions.

== See also ==
- GRU (Russian Federation)
- Espionage in the Czech Republic
- Czech–Russia Relations
- Unit 29155
