= 2014 Vrbětice ammunition warehouse explosions =

Series of explosions in the Czech Republic

Vrbětice ammunition warehouse explosions
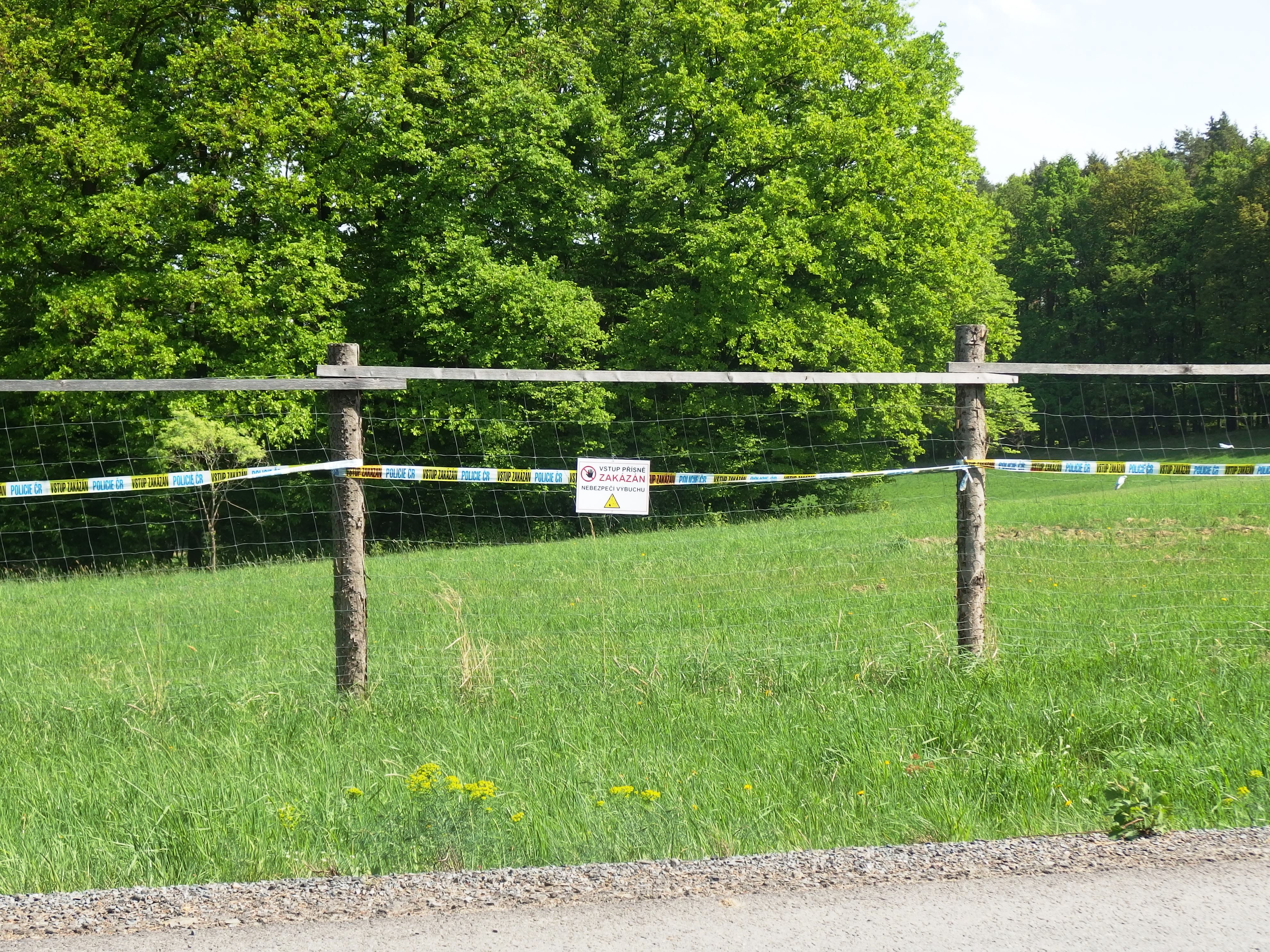
- A no entry clean-up zone secured by Czech police in May 2018
- Native name: Výbuchy muničních skladů ve Vrběticích
- Location: 49°7′24.6″N 17°53′51.7″E; Vrbětice, Vlachovice (Zlín District), Czech Republic
- Date: 16 October 2014, 3 December 2014
- Target: Ammunition depot
- Attack type: Sabotage
- Deaths: 2
- Perpetrator: GRU Unit 29155

In 2014, two explosions of ammunition depots occurred in Vrbětice, Vlachovice, in the Zlín District of the Czech Republic. The first explosion occurred on 16 October, and the second on 3 December. Two people were killed in the first explosion. The cleanup of unexploded ammunition left by the blasts was finished on 13 October 2020. According to the Security Information Service and the Police of the Czech Republic, two agents from the Russian military's GRU Unit 29155 were involved in the explosions, with the motivation of disrupting weapons supplies to Ukraine. On April 29, 2024, Czech president Petr Pavel declared the investigations and information available to him confirm the event to be a Russian attack on Czech soil.

== Background ==
Both destroyed warehouses were located on the site of the state-owned Military Technical Institute (Vojenský technický ústav, or VTÚ), leased by the Ostrava-based arms company Imex Group. A total of six buildings were leased on site, in which the company stored ammunition, weapons and other goods. The owner was Petr Bernatík Jr., who was the executive director and, together with his father, also worked in several other armaments companies.

== Explosions ==
=== First explosion ===
On 16 October 2014, the first explosion occurred at Warehouse No. 16, which contained 58 tonnes of military material, including ammunition and weapons. The explosion scattered ammunition up to 800 metres (870 yd) from the warehouse. Two employees of the company leasing the warehouse were killed and nearby villages were evacuated.

The ammunition depot was not present in Zlín District emergency plans, so firefighters at the scene were left unaware of the possible dangers. Immediately after the explosion, about 100 people from the nearby village Vlachovice, as well as students from elementary school and high school in Slavičín were evacuated from the surrounding area. The evacuation, which lasted for two days, was a preemptive measure, as pyrotechnicians were clearing the villages. For days, there were sudden uncontrolled detonations in the area caused by ammunition falling from trees or disturbed elements and by wildlife. On 30 November, pyrotechnicians completed clearing part of the complex, after which the planned removal of approximately 7,000 tonnes of ammunition from the remaining warehouses could begin.

=== Second explosion ===
On 3 December 2014, a second explosion occurred at Warehouse No. 12, which contained 98 tonnes of ammunition. The depot was 1.2 kilometres (0.75 mi) from the epicentre of the first explosion. 430 people from surrounding villages were evacuated. According to Imex Group's lawyer, artillery ammunition and submachine guns were stored in the depot. He believed that the depot could not have exploded on its own.

=== Cleaning up the damage ===
Uncontrolled blasts continued after the second explosion. The last one was observed in mid-December 2014. On 22 December, clean-up workers arrived in Vrbětice. In October 2020 the clean-up was finished. The total cost of cleaning the unexploded ammunition was estimated to be up to CZK 1 billion.

== Involvement of Russian GRU ==
According to the Security Information Service and the Police of the Czech Republic, the depot explosions were probably engineered by Russian military intelligence (GRU) officers. The announcement was made at a press conference by the Czech Prime Minister Andrej Babiš on 17 April 2021. Babiš said that there was "reasonable suspicion regarding a role of members of Russian military intelligence GRU Unit 29155 in the explosion." He said "Russia was not attacking the Czech Republic. The agents attacked ... the goods of a Bulgarian arms trader, who was probably selling these arms to parties fighting Russia ... The ammunition was supposed to explode en route. Of course it is unacceptable that GRU agents were undertaking the operation here - which they bungled".

Two Russian intelligence officers Alexander Mishkin and Anatoly Chepiga suspected of carrying out the poisoning of Sergei and Yulia Skripal in 2018 were alleged to have been involved in the explosions. Mishkin and Chepiga reportedly arrived in Prague from Moscow on 13 October 2014 and left on 16 October. They requested permission to visit the warehouses for the period of 13–17 October from Imex, using fake passports of citizens of Tajikistan and Moldova (Chepiga as Ruslan Tabarov, Mishkin as Nicolaj Popa). Although no one saw them in the ammunition depot, the investigators believe that both visited Vrbětice as potential arms buyers.

According to the Czech news magazine Respekt, the ammunition stored in the exploded depot was to be sold to Ukraine battling in the war in Donbas through the Bulgarian arms trader Emiliyan Gebrev; Gebrev himself was poisoned in 2015, allegedly by the GRU, and his arms depots in Bulgaria suffered five explosions linked to the GRU between 2011 and 2022. Jan Hamáček said the munitions were not planned to explode on Czech territory but only after being transported to Bulgaria. According to the news portal of Seznam.cz, the ammunition was to be sold to the Syrian opposition battling in the civil war against the armed forces led by Bashar al-Assad, an ally of Russia. EMCO, the Gebrev company, published a statement denying that the ammunition was heading to Syria or Ukraine. Later, Gebrev admitted in his email to The New York Times that his company had shipped military equipment to Ukraine after 2014.

Russian investigative group The Insider published further details, indicating that EMCO was one of two companies in the EU manufacturing ammunition compatible with Soviet designed arms, especially 120 mm mortar and 152 mm howitzer rounds. Supplies from the other company were purchased out by the GRU at a higher price, thus making them unavailable for Ukraine, while EMCO agreed to a sale to Ukrainian armed forces, which significantly increased their defense capabilities against Russian intervention. However, the particular supplies intended for Ukraine were not stored in Vrbětice, and the GRU either didn't know it or it hoped that the supplies from Vrbětice would be eventually transported to EMCO depots in Bulgaria and explode there (which explains the delayed detonation).

According to the conclusions of the joint investigation by Bellingcat, Der Spiegel, Respekt and The Insider, six officers of the GRU, led by the head of military unit 29155, general Andrey Averyanov, took part in the operation. In addition to Averyanov, Mishkin and Chepiga, among these six officers were Nikolay Yezhov, Denis Sergeev (cover identity "Sergey Fedotov") and Egor Gordienko ("Georgy Gorshkov"). Two out of six operated under the cover of diplomatic couriers. Data analyzed by Bellingcat supports the hypothesis that the 2014 explosions in Vrbětice were part of a longer-term GRU operation aimed at disrupting Ukraine's capabilities to procure weapons and munitions critical to its defense against Russian troops and Russia-sponsored militants in the war in Eastern Ukraine. The investigation at the time was ongoing and the National Center Against Organized Crime was examining potential support from a Czech citizen.

On January 30, 2024, Sofia City Prosecutor's Office announced that it issued a European Arrest Warrant against six Russian nationals accused of terrorism based on the court rulings.

On April 29, 2024, the Police of the Czech Republic announced the completion of the investigation of explosions, stating that it considered it proven that the explosions were carried out by GRU. Police officers from the National Centre for Combating Organised Crime investigated the matter as part of a joint investigation team with police officers from Great Britain and worked closely with police authorities from Ukraine and the USA. In May 2024, the commander of Unit 29155, Averyanov, was declared wanted by the Czech Police.

== Security Information Service intelligence report ==
On 7 April 2021, the Czech Prime Minister Andrej Babiš and other members of the Intelligence Activity Committee of the National Security Council were informed about the involvement of Russian secret agents by the Security Information Service. On the same day, a secret intelligence report by BIS was delivered to the Office of the Czech president Miloš Zeman; the Office delivered it to the president himself on 13 April. On 25 April the president said he had been first informed about the involvement by Babiš and Hamáček on 17 April; according to five sources of Deník N, the President did not read the report before that. In January 2022, it was reported that police wanted to analyze the intelligence report for fingerprints and DNA to find out who had unauthorized access to it but the Office of the President told them the report had been shredded in November 2021.

== Reactions following Czech Government's conclusions on Russian involvement ==
=== Domestic reactions ===
On 17 April 2021, Minister of the Interior and acting Minister of Foreign Affairs Jan Hamáček announced that the Czech Republic was expelling all Russian diplomats who had been identified as Russian intelligence services′ operatives, namely 18 diplomats in the Russian embassy in Prague.

On 19 April, Czech Prime Minister Andrej Babiš said that the incident was not an act of state terrorism, but a botched operation to destroy the goods of a Bulgarian ammunition trader, "who was probably selling those weapons to parties fighting against Russia". Babiš's statement was widely condemned and ridiculed by politicians, experts, and the public. Babiš was criticised by the Czech Social Democratic Party first deputy chairman Roman Onderka and by the opposition. Some public figures including Jan Hamáček, former Chief of the General Staff Petr Pavel, President of the Senate Miloš Vystrčil and Chairman of the Civic Democratic Party Petr Fiala labelled the incident as a terrorist attack and an act of state terrorism. Babiš apologized and said that the incident was an "unprecedented" terrorist attack. The initial statement by Babiš was quickly picked up by Russian media, including state-controlled RT.

On 18 April, Czech Trade Minister Karel Havlíček said that Russia's Rosatom would be excluded from the nuclear tender to build a new unit of the Dukovany Nuclear Power Station.

On 21 April, the Senate of the Czech Republic passed a resolution designating the explosion an "act of state terrorism against an EU country", and called on the Czech government, i.a., to claim from Russia a financial compensation for the victims, material damage and repair of the damages.

Prague City Hall demanded that the government negotiate with Russia on the return of part of the city's park Stromovka with a total area of about half a hectare that the Russian Embassy has been using since it was taken over by Soviet troops in 1968 after the Warsaw Pact invasion of Czechoslovakia.

Seznam Zprávy reported that Jan Hamáček was considering negotiating with Russia not to disclose evidence of Russia's involvement in the explosions in exchange for 1 million doses of Sputnik V vaccine. Hamáček denied the accusation and said that he intended to sue the media outlet. The journalist, Janek Kroupa, said that he had an audio recording.

On 25 April Czech president Miloš Zeman cast doubt on Russia's involvement, suggesting the blasts could have been caused accidentally due to the mishandling of explosives and said there was no conclusive evidence to charge Russia. This statement prompted thousands of demonstrators to take to the streets in Prague on 29 April, calling Zeman "a servant" of Russia, and demanding he be tried for treason. In response to Zeman's comments, Deputy Prime Minister Jan Hamáček on 26 April said that "only one line of investigation exists on the Vrbětice case and that is the one connected with movements of those members of the [GRU] unit 29155" and that "the president's speech was such that everybody found something in it to please them including the Russian Federation, unfortunately".

=== Reactions of other countries ===
On 17 April 2021, the day the Czech government made statements on Russia's involvement and expulsion of Russian diplomats, the US Embassy in Prague stated that the United States "stands with its steadfast ally, the Czech Republic. We appreciate their significant action to impose costs on Russia for its dangerous actions on Czech soil." The Czech Republic was also fully supported by the Minister of Foreign Affairs of the United Kingdom, Dominic Raab, who stated that this event corresponded to the previous behaviour of Russian secret service agents, as was revealed, for example, in Salisbury. Other countries that were the first to express support for the Czech Republic included Slovakia, Latvia, Ukraine, Canada and Poland. The chairman of the Britain's Commons foreign affairs select committee, Tom Tugendhat, stated that "the explosions in Vrbětice are the murder of two Czech citizens and a direct attack on a NATO country." He believed that the level of relations with the Russian Federation needed to be reduced immediately. Tugendhat said that the member states of the North Atlantic Alliance should expel the Russian ambassadors.

On 20 April, Poland, Hungary, and Slovakia of the Visegrád Group issued the statement "We are ready to continue to build our resilience against subversion. We will carry out this both at the national level and in cooperation with our NATO allies, as well as within the framework of the European Union. The Foreign Ministers of Poland, Slovakia and Hungary express their solidarity with the latest actions taken by the Czech Republic, our close partner, ally and neighbor."

On 22 April, NATO′s North Atlantic Council issued a statement that concluded by saying, "Allies express deep concern over the destabilising actions Russia continues to carry out across the Euro-Atlantic area, including on Alliance territory, and stand in full solidarity with the Czech Republic." On the same day, Slovakia expelled three Russian diplomats (Russia had 28 diplomats accredited in Slovakia), Slovak prime minister Eduard Heger commenting that Slovakia was acting in solidarity with the Czech Republic and that the decision was made after a thorough evaluation of information provided by Slovak intelligence services in coordination with the services of allied countries.

On 23 April, Lithuania, Latvia and Estonia expelled four Russian diplomats in solidarity with Prague.

Russia expelled 20 diplomats as persona non grata from the Czech embassy in Moscow. Maria Zakharova called the evidence presented by Czech authorities "a lie". On 23 April, Vladimir Putin signed a decree establishing a list of "unfriendly countries" which will be banned from hiring Russians at their diplomatic missions. On 14 May, Russia placed both the Czech Republic and the United States on the list of unfriendly countries. On 27 April, the Russian Foreign Minister Sergei Lavrov stated that additional countries could be added to the unfriendly list, especially the Baltic countries of Lithuania, Latvia, Estonia, and also Australia, Canada, the United Kingdom, and Ukraine, and on 10 June, Poland was proposed to be added to the unfriendly list because Andrzej Duda had called the explosions a "violation of international law".

== See also ==
- 2024 Toropets depot explosions
- 2025 GRU Exposure in Prague
- Russian sabotage operations in Europe
- Russian hybrid warfare
