= 2018 Amesbury poisonings =

2018 poisoning in Amesbury, England

- Location: Amesbury, Wiltshire, England
- Date: 30 June 2018
- Weapon: A-234 (suspected chemical weapon used)
- Deaths: Dawn Sturgess (8 July 2018; aged 44; after being admitted to hospital)
- Injuries: Charlie Rowley (aged 45; admitted to hospital; discharged 20 July 2018)
- Coroners: HM Coroner for Wiltshire and Swindon

On 30 June 2018, in Amesbury, two British nationals, Charlie Rowley and Dawn Sturgess, were admitted to Salisbury District Hospital in Wiltshire, England. Police determined that they were poisoned by a Novichok nerve agent of the same kind used in the poisoning of Sergei and Yulia Skripal in Salisbury, 8 miles (13 km) away, almost four months prior. Sturgess died on 8 July, and Rowley regained consciousness two days later. The inquest into the death of Sturgess was suspended upon the establishment of an independent inquiry, the outcome of which stated that Russian president Vladimir Putin was "morally responsible" for the death.

== Hospital admissions and subsequent death of Sturgess ==
According to the subsequent press report released by the Metropolitan Police, at 10:15 on Saturday 30 June 2018, the South Western Ambulance Service was called to a residential address in Amesbury after Dawn Sturgess had collapsed. She was subsequently taken to hospital and admitted. At 15:30, the ambulance service was again called to that address, after Charlie Rowley had fallen ill. He was taken to hospital, and Wiltshire Police were informed of both admissions.

On 8 July, Sturgess died at Salisbury District Hospital after doctors took the decision to switch off her life support. On 10 July, Rowley regained consciousness and there was a "small but significant improvement to his condition" according to the hospital. On 11 July, he was no longer in critical condition and the hospital downgraded his condition to "serious but stable". The same day, officers from the investigation team spoke with Rowley. He told his brother Matthew the nerve agent had been in a small perfume or aftershave bottle, which they had found in a park about nine days before spraying themselves with it. The police later closed and fingertip-searched Queen Elizabeth Gardens, a riverside park in central Salisbury, which the couple had visited the day before they fell ill. The funeral of Sturgess took place at Salisbury crematorium on 30 July 2018.

On 20 July, Rowley was discharged from the hospital. Over the weekend of 18/19 August 2018, he was re-admitted to hospital with sight problems. On 4 September 2018 he was reported to be ill with meningitis but was expected to leave hospital "within a month".

== Investigation ==
The incident was investigated by the Specialist Operations Directorate of the Metropolitan Police, assisted nationally by the National Counter Terrorism Policing Network and locally by Wiltshire Police, in a multi-agency response named Operation Fortis. According to the Metropolitan Police, there was nothing in either of the victims' backgrounds to suggest that they were deliberately targeted, and there were no other reports of people presenting with similar symptoms. The couple was believed to have been near the roads that were sealed off during the investigation of the Skripal poisoning in Salisbury.

During initial assessment, medical staff believed that the patients' illness was caused by the use of contaminated illegal drugs. But on 2 July, hospital staff had concerns over the symptoms the couple were displaying, and sent samples from both patients to the Government's Defence Science and Technology Laboratory (DSTL) at Porton Down for analysis. On 4 July the laboratory confirmed that the patients had been exposed to the Novichok nerve agent.

According to BBC News, the "most likely hypothesis" was that the Novichok was left over from the attack on the Skripals, and that the contaminated item which poisoned the couple "could be a vial or syringe because of the couple's lifestyle", as it was believed the Novichok was disposed of "in a haphazard way". Friends of the couple told The Guardian that Rowley frequently scavenged recycling bins for objects that he could sell, and that the couple's houses contained "loads of household things" they had picked up.

Sites in both Amesbury and Salisbury which were believed to have been visited by the couple were cordoned off. These included the local Boots Pharmacy, the Baptist Centre, and Muggleton Road in Amesbury, and Queen Elizabeth Gardens in Salisbury. Local residents were warned of an increased police presence, including officers wearing protective equipment.

On 6 July, police announced that officers had identified and spoken to several key witnesses and were reviewing more than 1,300 hours of CCTV footage which has been collected so far.

On 13 July a police cordon closed the north end of Rollestone Street, Salisbury, to enable members of the Counter Terrorism Policing Network to search John Baker House, a hostel for the homeless where Dawn Sturgess lived. On 24 July the cordon was lifted and the police announced that no contamination was found in the hostel.

The Metropolitan Police announced on 13 July 2018 that they had identified the source of the nerve agent that poisoned Sturgess and Rowley as being a "small bottle" discovered at Rowley's house in Amesbury, which was confirmed by analysis at DSTL Porton Down to contain Novichok. Matthew Rowley, brother of the victim, said Charlie told him that he had picked up "the perfume bottle". The Metropolitan Police refused to confirm this claim.

Also on 13 July, the intergovernmental Organisation for the Prohibition of Chemical Weapons (OPCW) received a request from the UK for technical assistance on the incident in Amesbury. The OPCW sent a team of specialists who collected samples and sent them to two laboratories. By 18 July, preliminary work was completed and the team left the UK.

On 7 August 2018, the Foreign Office announced that OPCW experts would return to Amesbury to collect further samples. A spokesman said: "During their visit, the OPCW's experts will collect more samples to inform their work following their visit in July. The samples will be analysed at highly reputable international laboratories designated by the OPCW." The poison was confirmed on 4 September by the OPCW to be the same kind of nerve agent as that used on the Skripals, but the OPCW also said that it could not determine if it was from the same batch.

On 5 September 2018, Assistant Commissioner Neil Basu said the police had "no doubt" that this incident was connected to the poisoning of Sergei and Yulia Skripal. He said, "we do not believe Dawn and Charlie were deliberately targeted, but became victims as a result of the recklessness [with] which such a toxic nerve agent was disposed of." On the same date, the Metropolitan Police released a detailed description of the Salisbury poisoning and named Alexander Petrov and Ruslan Boshirov as the suspects wanted. The announcement went on to state that the investigation into the Amesbury poisoning was ongoing by the Police and the Crown Prosecution Service, and further charges relating to Sturgess and Rowley would follow.

== Government response ==
On 5 July 2018, Home Secretary Sajid Javid chaired a meeting of the COBR committee to discuss the incident. In the House of Commons later that day, Javid stated the most likely hypothesis was that the Novichok was in an item discarded after the Skripal attack. He accused Russia of using Britain as a "dumping ground for poison".

== Interview with Rowley ==
Rowley gave an interview to ITV News on 24 July 2018, stating that he believed a sealed box of a recognisable brand of perfume, which he had found and given to Sturgess, was the source of the Novichok. His partner became sick "within 15 minutes" of spraying the "oily substance" onto her wrists before rubbing them together, under the assumption that it was perfume. He also stated that he came into contact with the chemical agent after some tipped onto his hands while attaching the plastic spray dispenser to the bottle, but had washed his hands soon after. They had used a knife to open the sealed packaging.

== Inquest and inquiry ==
Logo of the inquiry

The inquest for Sturgess was opened and adjourned by HM Coroner for Wiltshire and Swindon in Salisbury on 19 July 2018, with a Pre-Inquest Review listed for 16 January 2019. This was delayed, in part because the Crown Prosecution Service requested a suspension in view of the ongoing criminal investigation. The Senior Coroner, David Ridley, issued a 31-page ruling on the scope of the inquest on 20 December 2019, but no date for the full inquest was given. A preliminary hearing was held in March 2023. The UK government said that the delay in conducting the inquest was due to its desire to redact evidence to protect national security. Sturgess' family expressed disappointment at the delay and requested that the government release some of the material related to Sturgess' death.

The inquest was suspended upon the establishment of an independent inquiry. The "much delayed" inquiry began on 14 October 2024, led by Lord Hughes of Ombersley and starting with a hearing at the Guildhall in Salisbury. On 4 December 2025 the outcome of the inquiry was released.

== Inquiry outcome ==
The inquiry concluded that Russian president Vladimir Putin authorized the assassination attempt on Sergei Skripal using the Novichok nerve agent in Salisbury in 2018. A clear link was found between the use and discarding of Novichok and the death of Dawn Sturgess as well as the poisoning of her partner Charlie Rowley. Deploying such a toxic nerve agent in a busy city was described as an "astonishingly reckless act," with a foreseeable risk of harm to others beyond the intended target, dramatically increased by leaving the Novichok in a bottle disguised as perfume in the city. The inquiry also identified failings in managing the risk to Skripal from Russia after his arrival in the UK and deficiencies in the public health response following the Salisbury attack, prior to Dawn Sturgess's death. The report holds Russia's GRU and Putin morally responsible for the incident.

== Fate of flat ==
In June 2020 it was announced that the flat where the poisonings occurred, together with the one below it, would be demolished. Both Dawn Sturgess' family and her partner supported the proposal and liked the idea of the area being turned into a green space. Dawn's father, Stan Sturgess, said "It's a shame that it is being lost but I can imagine that people wouldn't want to live there." Rowley said "I think it's for the best. There would always be a stigma around it."
