= Vlachovice (Zlín District) =

- Municipality
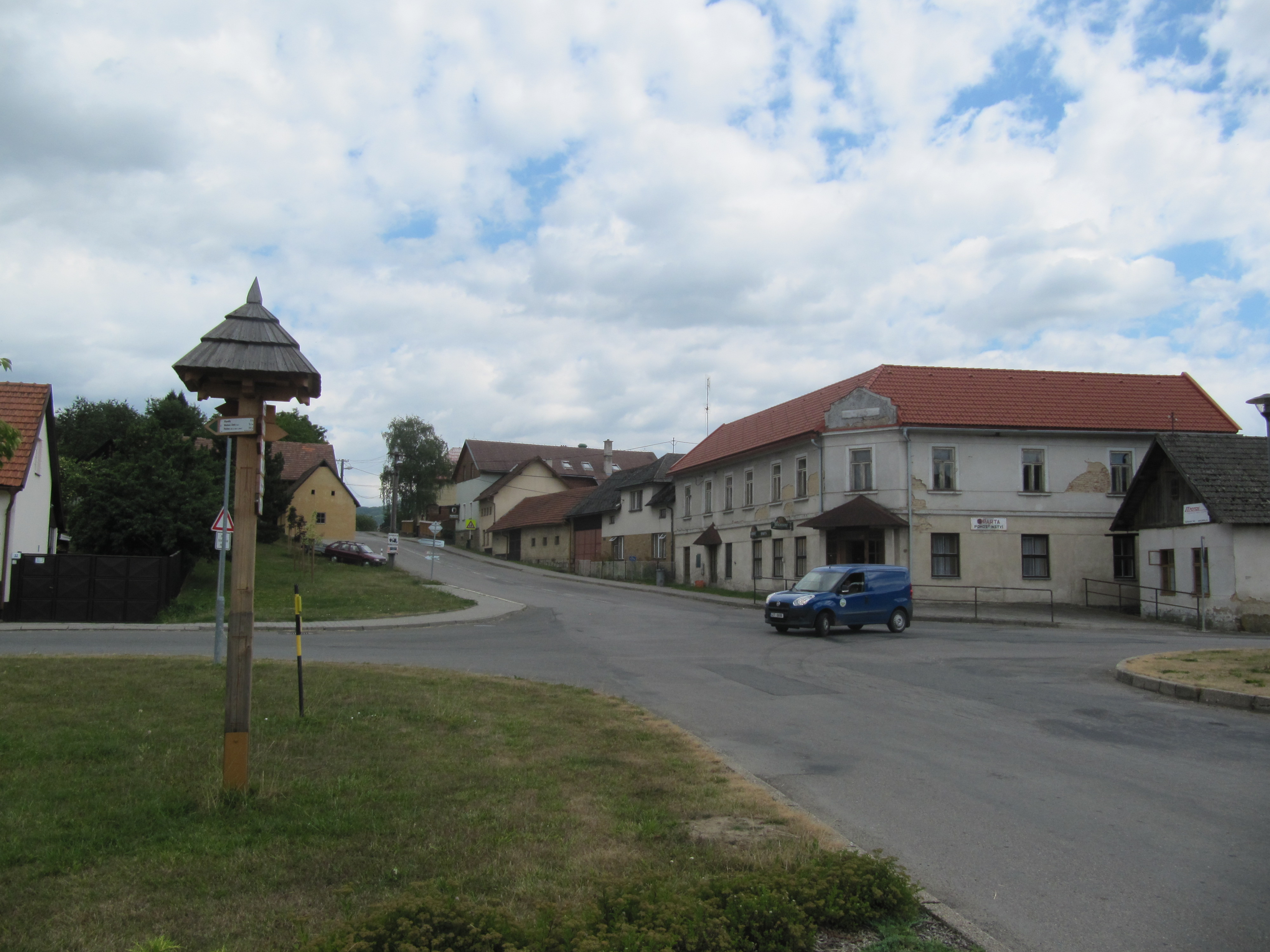
- Main intersection in Vlachovice

- Flag Coat of arms

- Location in the Czech Republic
- Coordinates: 49°7′26″N 17°56′24″E
- Country: Czech Republic
- Region: Zlín
- District: Zlín
- First mentioned: 1261

Area
  - Total: 22.38 km^{2} (8.64 sq mi)
- Elevation: 339 m (1,112 ft)

Population (2026-01-01)
  - Total: 1,485
  - Density: 66.35/km^{2} (171.9/sq mi)
- Time zone: UTC+1 (CET)
  - Summer (DST): UTC+2 (CEST)
- Postal code: 763 24
- Website: www.vlachovice.cz

Vlachovice [ˈvʊləxəˈvitsɛ] is a municipality and village in Zlín District in the Zlín Region of the Czech Republic. It has about 1,500 inhabitants.

Vlachovice lies approximately 23 kilometres (14 mi) south-east of Zlín and 276 km (171 mi) south-east of Prague.

== Administrative division ==
Vlachovice consists of two municipal parts (in brackets population according to the 2021 census):

- Vlachovice (1,042)
- Vrbětice (343)

== History ==
In 2014, a series of explosions occurred in a military warehouse in the village of Vrbětice. Presumably, the explosion was caused by the Russian GRU agents.

== Demographics ==
Historical population
Year	Pop.	±%
1869	1,170	—
1880	1,281	+9.5%
1890	1,352	+5.5%
1900	1,353	+0.1%
1910	1,311	−3.1%
1921	1,322	+0.8%
1930	1,300	−1.7%
1950	1,260	−3.1%
1961	1,559	+23.7%
1970	1,544	−1.0%
1980	1,547	+0.2%
1991	1,566	+1.2%
2001	1,544	−1.4%
2011	1,439	−6.8%
2021	1,385	−3.8%
Source: Censuses
