= Nikolayevka, Ivanovsky District, Amur Oblast =

Nikolayevka Николаевка
- Selo
- Location within Amur Oblast Location within Russia
- Coordinates: 50°35′N 128°20′E
- Country: Russia
- Region: Amur Oblast
- District: Ivanovsky District
- Time zone: UTC+9:00

Nikolayevka (Russian: Николаевка) is a rural locality (a selo) and the administrative center of Nikolayevsky Selsoviet of Ivanovsky District, Amur Oblast, Russia. The population was 287 as of 2018. There are five streets.

== Geography ==
Nikolayevka is located on the left bank of the Belaya River, 49 km northeast of Ivanovka (the district's administrative centre) by road. Novopokrovka is the nearest rural locality.
