= Vrbětice =

Village in the Czech Republic

- Village
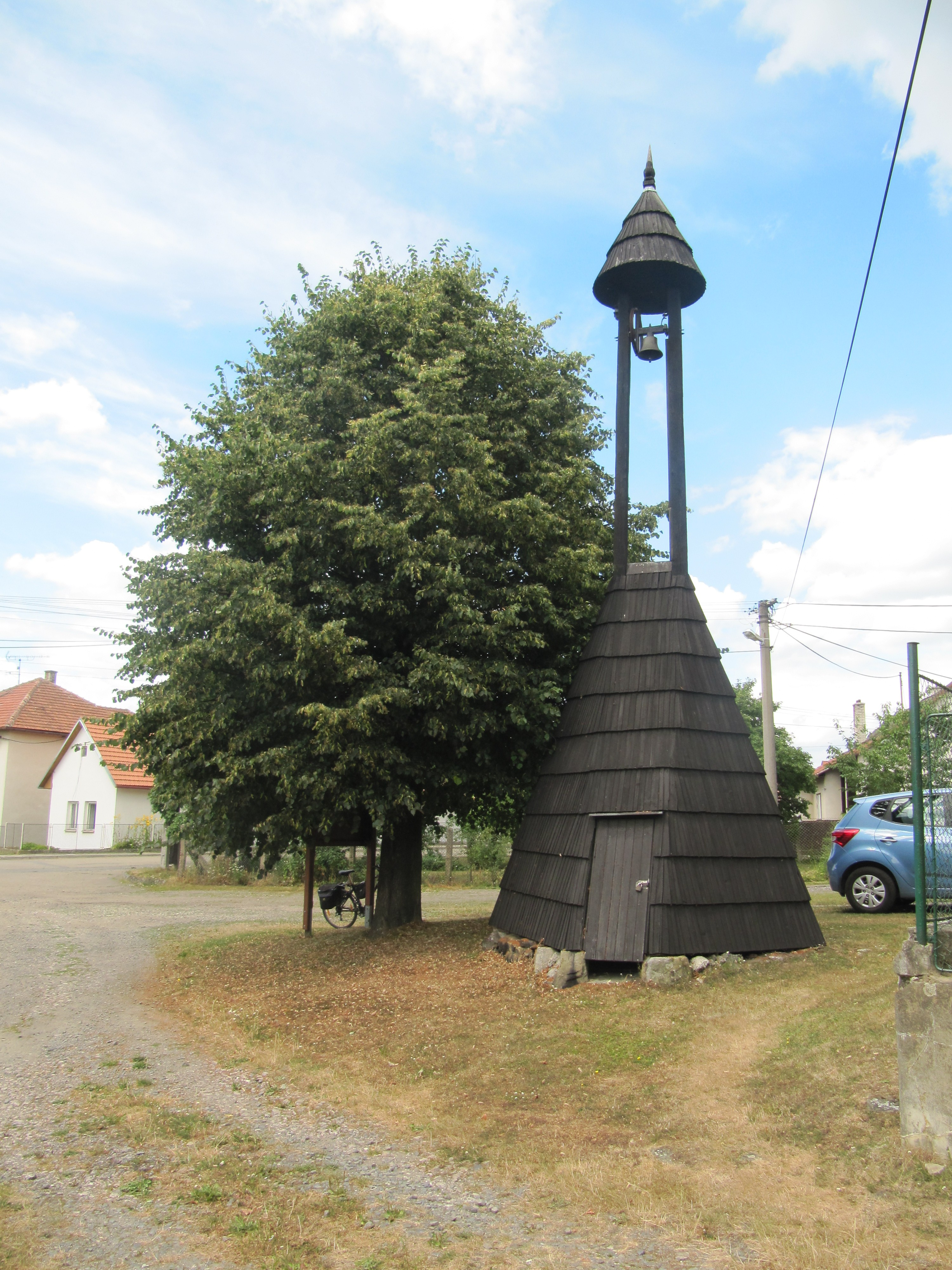
- Wooden bell tower

- Location in the Czech Republic
- Coordinates: 49°6′48″N 17°56′24″E
- Country: Czech Republic
- Region: Zlín
- District: Zlín
- Municipality: Vlachovice
- First mentioned: 1318

Area
  - Total: 6.16 km^{2} (2.38 sq mi)
- Elevation: 338 m (1,109 ft)

Population (2021)
  - Total: 343
  - Density: 55.7/km^{2} (144/sq mi)
- Time zone: UTC+1 (CET)
  - Summer (DST): UTC+2 (CEST)
- Postal code: 763 24
- Website: www.vlachovice.cz

Vrbětice (Czech pronunciation: [ˈvr̩bjɛcɪtsɛ]) is a village and municipal part of Vlachovice in Zlín District in the Zlín Region of the Czech Republic. It is located in the valley of the river Vlára.

== History ==
The first written mention of Vrbětice dates back to 1318. Although Vrbětice is in the immediate vicinity of Vlachovice, the village has always belonged to the Hošťálková rule and was at no time subject to Vlachovice. Serf conditions in Vrbětice were very mild. With the exception of forest work, its residents were exempt from forced labour. In the 1620 land register, a hereditary bailiff is documented for the first time in Vrbětice.

In 1850, after the abolition of patrimonial, Vrbětice formed a municipality in the district administration Uherský Brod and the judicial district Valašské Klobouky. The first school was built here in 1882.

In 2014, a series of explosions occurred in a military warehouse in Vrbětice. Presumably, the explosion was caused by the Russian GRU agents.

== Demographics ==
Historical population

Year	Pop.	±%
1869	346	—
1880	410	+18.5%
1890	399	−2.7%
1900	389	−2.5%
1910	412	+5.9%

Year	Pop.	±%
1921	401	−2.7%
1930	364	−9.2%
1950	382	+4.9%
1961	424	+11.0%
1970	441	+4.0%

Year	Pop.	±%
1980	398	−9.8%
1991	398	+0.0%
2001	391	−1.8%
2011	341	−12.8%
2021	343	+0.6%

Source: Censuses

== Sights ==
The main landmark and the only protected cultural monument is a timbered wooden bell tower from the 19th century. It is located in the centre of the village.
