= Poisoning of Sergei and Yulia Skripal =

2018 attempted murder in Salisbury, England

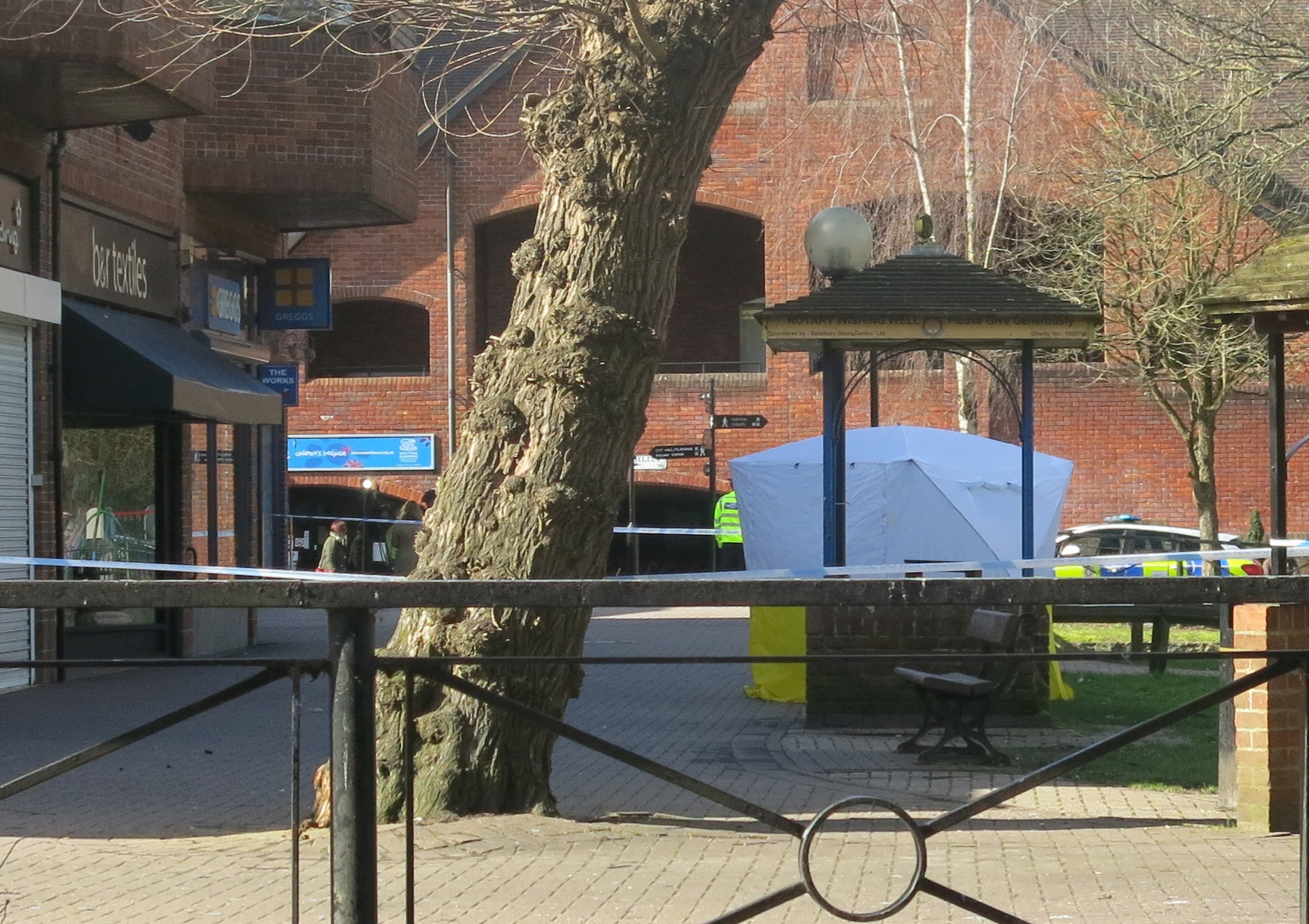
- A forensics tent covers the bench in Salisbury where Sergei and Yulia Skripal fell unconscious.
- Location: 51°4′11.619″N 1°47′54.371″W; Salisbury, Wiltshire, England
- Date: 4 March 2018
- Target: Sergei Viktorovich Skripal; Yulia Sergeevna Skripal
- Weapon: A-234 (suspected chemical weapon used)
- Victim: 1 death 4 admitted to hospital (subsequently discharged): Sergei and Yulia Skripal; Detective Sgt Nick Bailey (Wiltshire Police)
- Accused: "Alexander Petrov" (alias of Alexander Mishkin); "Ruslan Boshirov" (alias of Anatoliy Chepiga); "Sergej Fedotov" (alias of Denis Sergeev)

On 4 March 2018 in the city of Salisbury, Sergei Skripal and his daughter Yulia became victim of an assassination attempt through a Novichok nerve agent. He is a former Russian military officer and double agent for the British intelligence agencies. Both spent several weeks in hospital in a critical condition before being discharged. A police officer, Nick Bailey, was also taken into intensive care after attending the incident and was later discharged. (Note: Stephen Davies of Salisbury NHS Foundation Trust wrote an open letter to The Times, published on 16 March 2018, clarifying that contrary to reports, no members of the public were affected: "Sir, Further to your report ("Poison exposure leaves almost 40 needing treatment", 14 March), may I clarify that no patients have experienced symptoms of nerve agent poisoning in Salisbury and there have only ever been three patients with significant poisoning. Several people have attended the emergency department concerned that they may have been exposed. None has had symptoms of poisoning and none has needed treatment. Any blood tests performed have shown no abnormality. No member of the public has been contaminated by the agent involved.")

The British government accused Russia of attempted murder and announced a series of punitive measures against Russia, including the expulsion of diplomats. The UK's official assessment of the incident was supported by 28 other countries which responded similarly. Altogether, an unprecedented 153 Russian diplomats were expelled by the end of March 2018. Russia denied the accusations, expelled foreign diplomats in retaliation for the expulsion of its own diplomats, and accused Britain of the poisoning.

On 30 June 2018, a similar poisoning of two British nationals in Amesbury, 11 km (7 mi) north of Salisbury, involved the same nerve agent. Charlie Rowley found a perfume bottle, later discovered to contain the agent, in a litter bin somewhere in Salisbury and gave it to Dawn Sturgess, who sprayed it on her wrist. Sturgess fell ill within 15 minutes and died on 8 July, but Rowley, who had also come into contact with the poison, survived after treatment. British police believe this incident was not a targeted attack, but a result of the way the nerve agent was disposed of after the poisoning in Salisbury. A public inquiry was launched into the circumstances of Sturgess's death.

On 5 September 2018, British authorities identified two Russian nationals, using the names Alexander Petrov and Ruslan Boshirov, as suspected of the Skripals' poisoning, and alleged that they were active officers in Russian military intelligence. Later, investigative website Bellingcat stated that it had positively identified Ruslan Boshirov as being the highly decorated GRU Colonel Anatoliy Chepiga, that Alexander Petrov was Alexander Mishkin, also of the GRU, and that a third GRU officer present in the UK at the time was identified as Denis Vyacheslavovich Sergeev, believed to hold the rank of major general in the GRU. The pattern of his communications while in the UK indicates that he liaised with superior officers in Moscow.

The attempted assassination and subsequent agent exposures was an embarrassment for Russian president Vladimir Putin and for Russia's spying organisation. It was allegedly organised by the secret Unit 29155 of the Russian GRU, under the command of Major General Andrey Averyanov. On 27 November 2019, the Organisation for the Prohibition of Chemical Weapons (OPCW) added Novichok, the Soviet-era nerve agent used in the attack, to its list of banned substances.

== Chronology of events ==
=== Incident ===
3 March 2018

- At 14:40 GMT, Yulia Skripal, the 33-year-old daughter of Sergei Skripal, a 66-year-old resident of Salisbury, flew into Heathrow Airport from Sheremetyevo International Airport in Moscow, Russia.

4 March

- At 09:15 Sergei Skripal's burgundy 2009 BMW 320d was seen in the area of London Road, Churchill Way North and Wilton Road at Salisbury.
- At 13:30 Skripal's car was seen on Devizes Road on the way towards the town centre.
- At 13:40 the Skripals arrived in the upper level car park at The Maltings, Salisbury and then went to the Bishop's Mill pub in the town centre.
- At 14:20 they dined at Zizzi on Castle Street, leaving at 15:35.
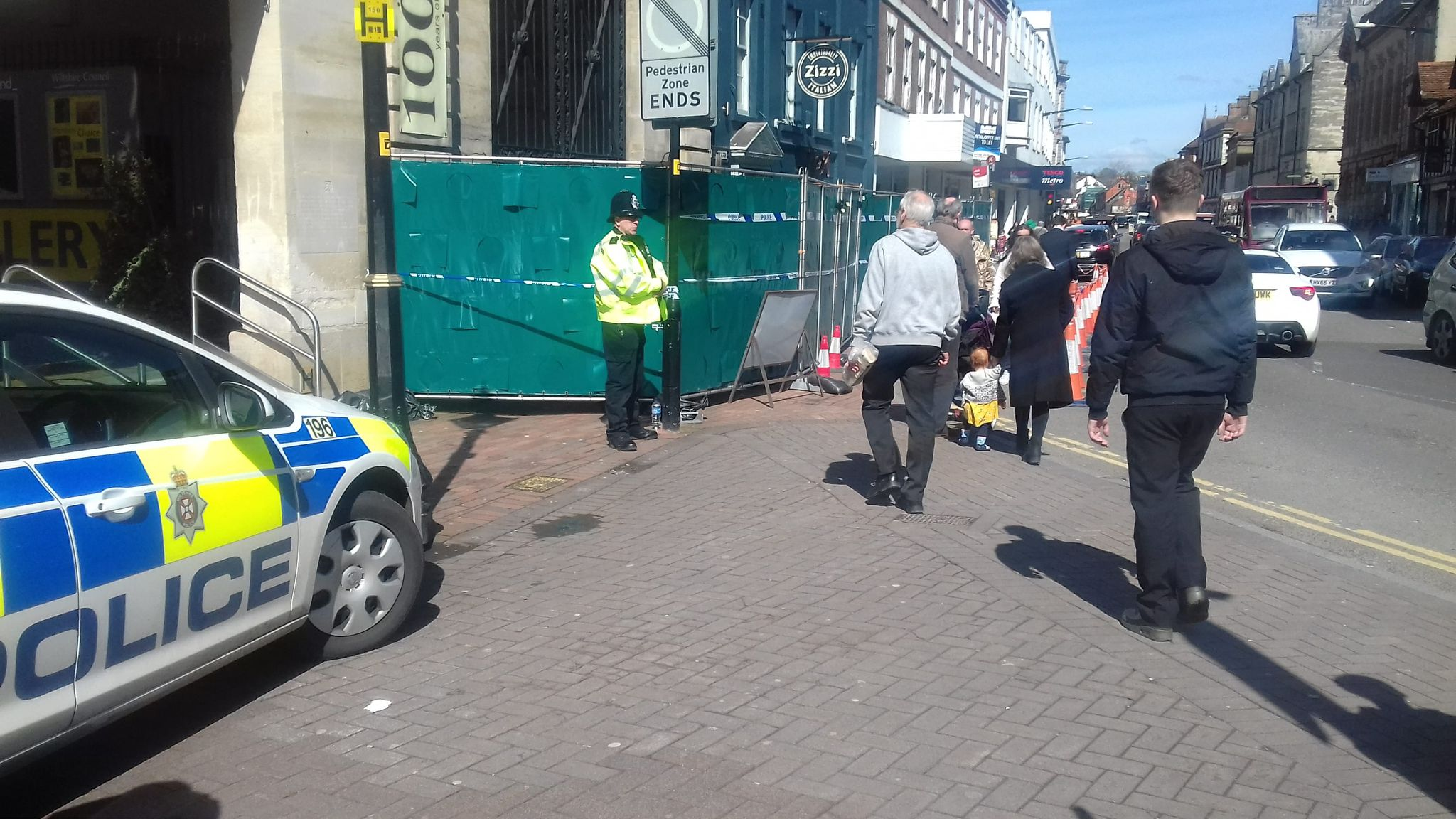
- Police guard the Zizzi restaurant in Salisbury after the poisonings.
  At 16:15 an emergency services call reported that a man and woman, later identified as Sergei and Yulia, had been found unconscious on a public bench outside The Maltings shopping centre in the centre of Salisbury by the passing Chief Nursing Officer for the British Army and her daughter. (Note: The nurse was the Chief Nursing Officer for the Army and the commanding officer of the Queen Alexandra's Royal Army Nursing Corps, Colonel Alison L McCourt OBE ARRC QHN; her teenage daughter later received an award for alerting her mother and assisting in first aid.) An eyewitness saw the woman foaming at the mouth with her eyes wide open but completely white. According to a later British government statement they were "slipping in and out of consciousness on a public bench".
- At 17:10, they were taken separately to Salisbury District Hospital by an ambulance and an air ambulance.

5 March

- At 09:03 the following morning, Salisbury NHS Foundation Trust declared a major incident in response to concerns raised by medical staff; shortly afterwards this became a multi-agency incident named Operation Fairline.

=== Consequent events ===
Health authorities checked 21 members of the emergency services and the public for possible symptoms; two police officers were treated for minor symptoms, said to be itchy eyes and wheezing, while one, Detective Sergeant Nick Bailey, who had been sent to Skripal's house, was in a serious condition. On 22 March, Bailey was discharged from the hospital. In a statement he said "normal life for me will probably never be the same" and thanked the hospital staff.

On 26 March, Skripal and his daughter were reported to still be critically ill. On 29 March it was announced that Yulia's condition was improving and she was no longer in a critical condition. After three weeks in a critical condition, Yulia regained consciousness and was able to speak. Sergei was also in a critical condition until he regained consciousness one month after the attack. On 5 April, doctors said that Sergei was no longer in critical condition and was responding well to treatment. On 9 April, Yulia was discharged from hospital and taken to a secure location. On 18 May, Sergei Skripal was discharged from the hospital too. On 23 May, a handwritten letter and a video statement by Yulia were released to the Reuters news agency for the first time after the poisoning. She stated that she was lucky to be alive after the poisoning and thanked the staff of the Salisbury hospital. She described her treatment as slow, heavy and extremely painful and mentioned a scar on her neck, apparently from a tracheotomy. She expressed hope that someday she would return to Russia. She thanked the Russian embassy for its offer of assistance but said she and her father were "not ready to take it".

On 5 April, British authorities said that inside Skripal's house, which had been sealed by the police, two guinea pigs were found dead by vets, when they were allowed in, along with a cat in a distressed state, which had to be put down.

On 22 November the first interview with DS Bailey was released, in which he reported that he had been poisoned, despite the fact that he inspected the Skripals' house wearing a forensic suit. In addition to the poisoning, Bailey and his family had lost their home and all their possessions, because of contamination. Investigators said that the perfume bottle containing Novichok nerve agent, which was later found in a bin, had contained enough of the nerve agent to potentially kill thousands of people.

In early 2019, building contractors built a scaffolding "sealed frame" over the house and the garage of Skripal's home. A military team then dismantled and removed the roofs on both buildings over the course of two weeks. Cleaning and decontamination was followed by rebuilding over a period of four months. On 22 February 2019, Government officials announced that the last of the 12 sites that had been undergoing an intense and hazardous clean-up – Skripal's house – had been judged safe.

In May 2019, Sergei Skripal made a phone call and left a voice message to his niece Viktoria living in Russia. This was the first time after the poisoning that his voice had been heard by the public.

In August 2019 it was confirmed that a second police officer had been poisoned while investigating, but only in trace amounts.

== Investigation ==
The first public response to the poisoning came on 6 March. It was agreed under the Counter Terrorism Policing network that the Counter Terrorism Command based within the Metropolitan Police would take over the investigation from Wiltshire Police. Assistant Commissioner Mark Rowley, head of Counter Terrorism Policing, appealed for witnesses to the incident following a COBR meeting chaired by Home Secretary Amber Rudd.

Samples of the nerve agent used in the attack tested positive at the Defence Science and Technology Laboratory at Porton Down for a "very rare" nerve agent, according to the UK Home Secretary.

180 military experts in chemical warfare defence and decontamination, as well as 18 vehicles, were deployed on 9 March to assist the Metropolitan Police to remove vehicles and objects from the scene and look for any further traces of the nerve agent. The personnel were drawn mostly from the Army, including instructors from the Defence CBRN Centre and the 29 Explosive Ordnance Disposal and Search Group, as well as from the Royal Marines and Royal Air Force. The vehicles included TPz Fuchs operated by Falcon Squadron from the Royal Tank Regiment. On 11 March, the UK government advised those present at either The Mill pub (now, The Bishops Mill, 7, The Maltings) or the Zizzi restaurant in Salisbury on 4 and 5 March to wash or wipe their possessions, emphasising that the risk to the general public was low.

Several days later, on 12 March, Prime Minister Theresa May said the agent had been identified as one of the Novichok family of agents, believed to have been developed in the 1980s by the Soviet Union. According to the Russian ambassador to the UK, Alexander Yakovenko, the British authorities identified the agent as A-234, which is derived from an earlier version known as A-232.

By 14 March, the investigation was focused on Skripal's home and car, a restaurant in which they dined, a pub where they had drinks, and a bench where the two fell unconscious. A recovery vehicle was removed by the military from Gillingham in Dorset on 14 March, in connection with the poisoning.

Subsequently, there was speculation within the British media that the nerve agent had been planted in one of the personal items in Yulia Skripal's suitcase before she left Moscow for London, and in US media that it had been planted in their car.

Ahmet Üzümcü, Director-General of the Organisation for the Prohibition of Chemical Weapons (OPCW), said on 20 March that it will take "another two to three weeks to finalise the analysis" of samples taken from the poisoning of Skripal. On 22 March, the Court of Protection gave permission for new blood samples to be obtained from Yulia and Sergei Skripal for use by the OPCW. By 28 March, the police investigation concluded that the Skripals were poisoned at Sergei's home, with the highest concentration being found on the handle of his front door. On 12 April the OPCW confirmed the UK's analysis of the type of nerve agent and reported it was of a "high purity", stating that the "name and structure of the identified toxic chemical are contained in the full classified report of the Secretariat, available to States Parties".

A declassified letter from the UK's national security adviser, Sir Mark Sedwill, to NATO Secretary General Jens Stoltenberg, stated Russian military intelligence hacked Yulia Skripal's email account since at least 2013 and tested methods for delivering nerve agents including on door handles.

The Department for Environment confirmed the nerve agent was delivered "in a liquid form". They said eight sites require decontamination, which will take several months to complete and cost millions of pounds. The BBC reported experts said the nerve agent does not evaporate or disappear over time. Intense cleaning with caustic chemicals is required to get rid of it. The Skripals' survival was possibly due to the weather – there had been heavy fog and high humidity, and according to its inventor and other scientists, moisture weakens the potency of this type of toxin.

On 22 April 2018, it was reported that British counter-terror police had identified a suspect in the poisoning: a former Federal Security Service (FSB) officer (reportedly a 54-year-old former FSB captain) who acted under several code names including "Gordon" and "Mihails Savickis". According to detectives, he led a team of six Russian assassins who organised the chemical weapons attack. Sedwill reported on 1 May 2018 however that UK intelligence and police agencies had failed to identify the individual or individuals who carried out the attack.

On 3 May 2018, the head of the OPCW, Ahmet Üzümcü, informed the New York Times that he had been told that about 50–100 grams of the nerve agent was thought to have been used in the attack, which indicated it was likely created for use as a weapon and was enough to kill a large number of people. The next day however the OPCW made a correcting statement that the "quantity should probably be characterised in milligrams", though "the OPCW would not be able to estimate or determine the amount of the nerve agent that was used".

On 19 July the Press Association reported that police believed they had identified "several Russians" as the suspected perpetrators of the attack. They had been identified through CCTV, cross-checked with border entry data.

On 6 August 2018, it was reported that the British government was "poised to submit an extradition request to Moscow for two Russians suspected of carrying out the Salisbury nerve agent attack". The UK has no extradition treaty with Russia. The Metropolitan Police used two super recognisers to identify the suspects after trawling through up to 5,000 hours of CCTV footage from Salisbury and numerous airports across the country.

British Prime Minister Theresa May announced in the Commons the same day that British intelligence services had identified the two suspects as officers in the G. U. Intelligence Service (formerly known as GRU) and the assassination attempt was not a rogue operation and was "almost certainly" approved at a senior level of the Russian government. May also said Britain would push for the EU to agree new sanctions against Russia.

On 5 September 2018, the Russian news site Fontanka reported that the numbers on leaked passport files for Petrov and Boshirov are only three digits apart, and fall in a range that includes the passport files for a Russian military official expelled from Poland for spying. It is not known how the passport files were obtained, but Andrew Roth, the Moscow correspondent for The Guardian, commented that "If the reporting is confirmed, it would be a major blunder by the intelligence agency, allowing any country to check passport data for Russians requesting visas or entering the country against a list of nearly 40 passport files of suspected GRU officers." On 14 September 2018, the online platforms Bellingcat and The Insider Russia observed that in Petrov's leaked passport files, there is no record of a residential address or any identification papers prior to 2009, suggesting that the name is an alias created that year; the analysis also noted that Petrov's dossier is stamped "Do not provide any information" and has the handwritten annotation "S.S.," a common abbreviation in Russian for "top secret". On 15 September 2018, the Russian opposition newspaper Novaya Gazeta reported finding in Petrov's passport files a cryptic number that seems to be a telephone number associated with the Russian Defence Ministry, most likely the Military Intelligence Directorate.

As part of the announcement Scotland Yard and the Counter Terrorism Command released a detailed track of the individuals' 48 hours in the UK. This covered their arrival from Moscow at Gatwick Airport, a trip to Salisbury by train the day before the attack, stated by police to be for reconnaissance, a trip to Salisbury by train on the day of the attack, and return to Moscow via Heathrow Airport. The two spent both nights at the City Stay Hotel, next to Bow Church DLR station in Bow, East London. Novichok was found in their hotel room after police sealed it off on 4 May 2018. Neil Basu, National Lead for Counter Terrorism Policing said that tests were carried out on their hotel room and it was "deemed safe".

On 26 September 2018, the real identity of the suspect named by police as Ruslan Boshirov was revealed as Colonel Anatoliy Vladimirovich Chepiga by The Daily Telegraph, citing reporting by itself and Bellingcat, with Petrov having a more junior rank in the GRU. The 39-year-old was made a Hero of the Russian Federation by decree of the President in 2014. Two European security sources confirmed that the details were accurate. The BBC commented: "The BBC understands there is no dispute over the identification." The Secretary of State for Defence Gavin Williamson wrote: "The true identity of one of the Salisbury suspects has been revealed to be a Russian Colonel. I want to thank all the people who are working so tirelessly on this case." However, that statement was subsequently deleted from Twitter.

On 8 October 2018, the real identity of the suspect named by police as Alexander Petrov was revealed as Alexander Mishkin.

On 22 November 2018, more CCTV footage, with the two suspects walking in Salisbury, was published by the police.

On 19 December 2018, Mishkin (a.k.a. Petrov) and Chepiga (a.k.a. Boshirov) were added to the sanctions list of the United States Treasury Department, along with other 13 members of the GRU agency.

On 6 January 2019, the Telegraph reported that the British authorities had established all the essential details of the assassination attempt, including the chain of command that leads up to Vladimir Putin. In February, a third GRU officer present in the UK at the time, Denis Sergeev, was identified. In September 2021, the BBC reported that Crown Prosecution Service had authorised charges against the three men but that formal charges could not be laid unless the men were arrested. The charges authorised against the three men are conspiracy to murder, attempted murder, causing grievous bodily harm and use and possession of a chemical weapon.

== Response of the United Kingdom ==
Within days of the attack, political pressure began to mount on Theresa May's government to take action against the perpetrators, and most senior politicians appeared to believe that the Russian government was behind the attack. The situation was additionally sensitive for Russia as Russian president Vladimir Putin was facing his fourth presidential election in mid-March, and Russia was to host the 2018 FIFA World Cup football competition in June. When giving a response to an urgent question from Tom Tugendhat, the chairman of the Foreign Affairs Select Committee of the House of Commons, who suggested that Moscow was conducting "a form of soft war against the West", Foreign Secretary Boris Johnson on 6 March said the government would "respond appropriately and robustly" if the Russian state was found to have been involved in the poisoning. UK Home Secretary Amber Rudd said on 8 March 2018 that the use of a nerve agent on UK soil was a "brazen and reckless act" of attempted murder "in the most cruel and public way".

Prime Minister Theresa May said in the House of Commons on 12 March:

It is now clear that Mr Skripal and his daughter were poisoned with a military-grade nerve agent of a type developed by Russia. This is part of a group of nerve agents known as 'Novichok'. Based on the positive identification of this chemical agent by world-leading experts at the Defence Science and Technology Laboratory at Porton Down; our knowledge that Russia has previously produced this agent and would still be capable of doing so; Russia's record of conducting state-sponsored assassinations; and our assessment that Russia views some defectors as legitimate targets for assassinations; the Government has concluded that it is highly likely that Russia was responsible for the act against Sergei and Yulia Skripal. Mr Speaker, there are therefore only two plausible explanations for what happened in Salisbury on 4 March. Either this was a direct act by the Russian State against our country. Or the Russian government lost control of this potentially catastrophically damaging nerve agent and allowed it to get into the hands of others.

May also said that the UK government requested that Russia explain which of these two possibilities it was by the end of 13 March 2018. She also said: "[T]he extra-judicial killing of terrorists and dissidents outside Russia were given legal sanction by the Russian Parliament in 2006. And of course Russia used radiological substances in its barbaric assault on Mr Litvinenko." She said that the UK government would "consider in detail the response from the Russian State" and in the event that there was no credible response, the government would "conclude that this action amounts to an unlawful use of force by the Russian State against the United Kingdom" and measures would follow. British media billed the statement as "Theresa May's ultimatum to Putin".

On 13 March 2018, UK Home Secretary Amber Rudd ordered an inquiry by the police and security services into alleged Russian state involvement in 14 previous suspicious deaths of Russian exiles and businessmen in the UK.

May unveiled a series of measures on 14 March 2018 in retaliation for the poisoning attack, after the Russian government refused to meet the UK's request for an account of the incident. One of the chief measures was the expulsion of 23 Russian diplomats which she presented as "actions to dismantle the Russian espionage network in the UK", as these diplomats had been identified by the UK as "undeclared intelligence agents". The BBC reported other responses, including:

- Increasing checks on private flights, customs and freight
- Freezing Russian state assets where there is evidence that they may be used to threaten the life or property of UK nationals or residents
- Plans to consider new laws to increase defences against "hostile state activity"
- Ministers and the British royal family boycotting the 2018 FIFA World Cup in Russia
- Suspending all high-level bilateral contacts between the UK and Russia
- Retraction of the state invitation to Russia's foreign minister Sergey Lavrov
- A new £48-million chemical weapons defence centre
- Offering voluntary vaccinations against anthrax to British troops who are held at high readiness so that they are ready to deploy to areas where there is risk of this type of attack

May said that some measures which the government planned could "not be shared publicly for reasons of national security". Jeremy Corbyn cast doubt in his parliamentary response to May's statement concerning blaming the attack on Russia prior to the results of an independent investigation, which provoked criticism from some MPs, including members of his own party. A few days later, Corbyn was satisfied that the evidence pointed to Russia. He supported the expulsion but argued that a crackdown on money laundering by UK financial firms on behalf of Russian oligarchs would be a more effective measure against "the Putin regime" than the Conservative government's plans. Corbyn pointed to the pre-Iraq War judgements about Iraq and weapons of mass destruction as reason to be suspicious.

The United Nations Security Council called an urgent meeting on 14 March 2018 on the initiative of the UK to discuss the Salisbury incident. According to the Russian mission's press secretary, the draft press statement introduced by Russia at the United Nations Security Council meeting was blocked by the UK. The UK and the US blamed Russia for the incident during the meeting, with the UK accusing Russia of breaking its obligations under the Chemical Weapons Convention. Separately, the White House fully supported the UK in attributing the attack to Russia, as well as the punitive measures taken against Russia. The White House also accused Russia of undermining the security of countries worldwide.

The UK, and subsequently NATO, requested Russia provide "full and complete disclosure" of the Novichok programme to the OPCW. On 14 March 2018, the government stated it would supply a sample of the substance used to the OPCW once UK legal obligations from the criminal investigation permitted.

Boris Johnson said on 16 March that it was "overwhelmingly likely" that the poisoning had been ordered directly by Russian president Vladimir Putin, which marked the first time the British government accused Putin of personally ordering the poisoning. According to the UK Foreign Office, the UK attributed the attack to Russia based on Porton Down's determination that the chemical was Novichok, additional intelligence, and a lack of alternative explanations from Russia. The Defence Science and Technology Laboratory announced that it was "completely confident" that the agent used was Novichok, but they still did not know the "precise source" of the agent.

The UK had held an intelligence briefing with its allies in which it stated that the Novichok chemical used in the Salisbury poisoning was produced at a chemical facility in the town of Shikhany, Saratov Oblast, Russia.

== Response of Russia ==
=== Russian government ===
On 6 March 2018 Andrey Lugovoy, deputy of Russia's State Duma and alleged killer of Alexander Litvinenko, in his interview with the Echo of Moscow said: "Something constantly happens to Russian citizens who either run away from Russian justice, or for some reason choose for themselves a way of life they call a change of their Motherland. So the more Britain accepts on its territory every good-for-nothing, every scum from all over the world, the more problems they will have."

Russian Foreign Minister Sergey Lavrov on 9 March rejected Britain's claim of Russia's involvement in Skripal's poisoning and accused the United Kingdom of spreading propaganda. Lavrov said that Russia was "ready to cooperate" and demanded access to the samples of the nerve-agent which was used to poison Skripal. The request was rejected by the British government.

Following Theresa May's 12 March statement in Parliament – in which she gave President Putin's administration until midnight of the following day to explain how a former spy was poisoned in Salisbury, otherwise she would conclude it was an "unlawful use of force" by the Russian state against the UK, Lavrov, talking to the Russian press on 13 March, said that the procedure stipulated by the Chemical Weapons Convention should be followed whereunder Russia was entitled to have access to the substance in question and 10 days to respond.

On 17 March, Russia announced that it was expelling 23 British diplomats and ordered the closure of the UK's consulate in St Petersburg and the British Council office in Moscow, stopping all British Council activities in Russia.

Russia has officially declared the poisoning to be a fabrication and a "grotesque provocation rudely staged by the British and U.S. intelligence agencies" to undermine the country.

The Russian government and embassy of Russia in the United Kingdom repeatedly requested access to the Skripals, and sought to offer consular assistance. These requests and offers were respectively denied or declined.

On 5 September 2018 Putin's Press Secretary, Dmitry Peskov, stated that Russia had not received any official request from Britain for assistance in identifying the two suspected Russian GRU military intelligence officers that Scotland Yard believes carried out the Skripal attack. The same day, the Foreign Ministry of Russia asserted that UK ambassador in Moscow, Laurie Bristow, had said that London would not provide Russia with the suspects' fingerprints, passport numbers, visa numbers, or any extra data.

On 12 September 2018, Putin, while answering questions at the plenary meeting of the 4th Eastern Economic Forum in Russia's Far Eastern port city of Vladivostok said that the identities of both men London suspected of involvement in the Skripal case were known to the Russian authorities and that both were civilians, who had done nothing criminal. He also said he would like the men to come forward to tell their story. In a 13 September 2018 interview on the state-funded television channel RT, the accused claimed to be sports nutritionists who had gone to Salisbury merely to see the sights and look for nutrition products, saying that they took a second day-trip to Salisbury because slush had dampened their first one.

On 25 September, the FSB began searching for Ministry of Internal Affairs (MVD) officers who had provided journalists with foreign passport and flight information about the suspects.

On 26 September, the same day one of the suspects was identified as the Colonel of GRU, Lavrov urged the British authorities to cooperate in the investigation of the case, said Britain had given no proof of Russia's guilt and suggested that Britain had something to hide.

=== Russian state media ===
For a few days following the poisoning, the story was discussed by web sites, radio stations and newspapers, but Russian state-run main national TV channels largely ignored the incident.

Eventually, on 7 March, anchor Kirill Kleimyonov of the state television station Channel One Russia's current affairs programme Vremya mentioned the incident by attributing the allegation to Boris Johnson. After speaking of Johnson disparagingly, Kleimyonov said that being "a traitor to the motherland" was one of the most hazardous professions and warned: "Don't choose England as a next country to live in. Whatever the reasons, whether you're a professional traitor to the motherland or you just hate your country in your spare time, I repeat, no matter, don't move to England. Something is not right there. Maybe it's the climate, but in recent years there have been too many strange incidents with a grave outcome. People get hanged, poisoned, they die in helicopter crashes and fall out of windows in industrial quantities." Kleimyonov's commentary was accompanied by a report highlighting previous suspicious Russia-related deaths in the UK, namely those of financier Alexander Perepilichny, businessman Boris Berezovsky, ex-FSB officer Alexander Litvinenko and radiation expert Matthew Puncher. Puncher discovered that Litvinenko was poisoned by polonium; he died in 2006, five months after a trip to Russia.

Dmitry Kiselyov, pro-Kremlin TV presenter, said on 11 March that the poisoning of Sergei Skripal, who was "completely wrung out and of little interest" as a source, was only advantageous to the British to "nourish their Russophobia" and organise the boycott of the FIFA World Cup scheduled for June 2018. Kiselyov referred to London as a "pernicious place for Russian exiles".

The prominent Russian television hosts' warnings to Russians living in the UK were echoed by a similar direct warning from a senior member of the Russian Federation Council, Andrey Klimov, who said: "It's going to be very unsafe for you."

Claims made by Russian media were fact-checked by UK media organisations.

An interview with two men claiming to be the suspects named by the UK was aired on RT on 13 September 2018 with RT editor Margarita Simonyan. They said they were ordinary tourists who had wished to see Stonehenge, Old Sarum, and the "famous… 123-metre spire" of Salisbury Cathedral. They also said that they "maybe approached Skripal's house, but we didn't know where it was located," and denied using Novichok, which they had allegedly transported in a fake perfume bottle, saying, "Is it silly for decent lads to have women's perfume? The customs are checking everything, they would have questions as to why men have women's perfume in their luggage." Although Simonyan avoided most questions about the two men's backgrounds, she hinted that they might be gay by asking, "All footage features you two together… What do you have in common that you spend so much time together?" The New York Times interpreted the hint by noting that "The possibility that Mr. Petrov and Mr. Boshirov could be gay would, for a Russian audience, immediately rule out the possibility that they serve as military intelligence officers."

On 22 August 2022, the editor-in-chief of Kremlin-backed RT network, Margarita Simonyan, appeared to lend support to the suggestion that Russia had been involved in the poisoning, with her remark "I am sure we can find professionals willing to admire the famous spires in the vicinity of Tallinn" – seen as a reference to the agents' claims that they were sightseeing in Salisbury.

== Chemical weapons experts and intelligence ==
=== Porton Down ===
On 3 April 2018 Gary Aitkenhead, the chief executive of the Government's Defence Science and Technology Laboratory (Dstl) at Porton Down responsible for testing the substance involved in the case, said they had established the agent was Novichok or from that family but had been unable to verify the "precise source" of the nerve agent and that they had "provided the scientific info to Government who have then used a number of other sources to piece together the conclusions you have come to". Aitkenhead refused to comment on whether the laboratory had developed or maintains stocks of Novichok. He also dismissed speculations the substance could have come from Porton Down: "There is no way anything like that could have come from us or left the four walls of our facility." Aitkenhead stated the creation of the nerve agent was "probably only within the capabilities of a state actor", and that there was no known antidote.

=== Former Russian scientists and intelligence officers ===
Vil Mirzayanov, a former Soviet Union scientist who worked at the research institute that developed the Novichok class of nerve agents and lives in the United States, believes that hundreds of people could have been affected by residual contamination in Salisbury. He said that Sergei and Yulia Skripal, if poisoned with Novichok, would be left with debilitating health issues for the rest of their lives. He also criticised the response of Public Health England, saying that washing personal belongings was insufficient to remove traces of the chemical.

Two other Russian scientists who now live in Russia and have been involved in Soviet-era chemical weapons development, Vladimir Uglev and Leonid Rink, were quoted as saying that Novichok agents had been developed in the 1970s–1980s within the programme that was officially titled FOLIANT, while the term Novichok referred to a whole system of chemical weapons use; they, as well as Mirzayanov, who published Novichok's formula in 2008, also noted that Novichok-type agents might be synthesised in other countries. In 1995, Leonid Rink received a one-year suspended sentence for selling Novichok agents to unnamed buyers, soon after the fatal poisoning of Russian banker Ivan Kivilidi by Novichok.

A former KGB and FSB officer, Boris Karpichkov, who operated in Latvia in the 1990s and fled to the UK in 1998, told ITV's Good Morning Britain that on 12 February 2018, three weeks before the Salisbury attack and exactly on his birthday, he received a message over the burner phone from "a very reliable source" in the FSB telling Karpichkov that "something bad [wa]s going to happen with [him] and seven other people, including Mr. Skripal", whom he then knew nothing about. Karpichkov said he disregarded the message at the time, thinking it was not serious, as he had previously received such messages. According to Karpichkov, the FSB's list includes the names of Oleg Gordievsky and William Browder.

=== Spiez Laboratory in Switzerland ===
The Swiss Federal Intelligence Service announced on 14 September 2018 that two Russian spies had been caught in the Netherlands and expelled earlier in the year for attempting to hack into the Spiez Laboratory in the Swiss town of Spiez, a designated lab of the OPCW that had been tasked with confirming that the samples of poison collected in Salisbury were Novichok. The spies were discovered through a joint investigation by the Swiss, Dutch, and British intelligence services. The two men expelled were not the same as the Salisbury suspects.

== Response from other countries and organisations ==
=== US government ===
Following Theresa May's statement in Parliament, the US Secretary of State Rex Tillerson released a statement on 12 March that fully supported the stance of the UK government on the poisoning attack, including "its assessment that Russia was likely responsible for the nerve agent attack that took place in Salisbury". The following day, US President Donald Trump said that Russia was likely responsible.

United States Ambassador to the United Nations Nikki Haley at the Security Council briefing on 14 March 2018 stated: "The United States believes that Russia is responsible for the attack on two people in the United Kingdom using a military-grade nerve agent".

Following the United States National Security Council's recommendation, President Trump, on 26 March, ordered the expulsion of sixty Russian diplomats (referred to by the White House as "Russian intelligence officers") and the closure of the Russian consulate in Seattle. The action was cast as being "in response to Russia's use of a military-grade chemical weapon on the soil of the United Kingdom, the latest in its ongoing pattern of destabilising activities around the world".

On 8 August, five months after the poisoning, the US government agreed to place sanctions on Russian banks and exports. On 6 August, the US State Department concluded that Russia was behind the poisoning. The sanctions, which are enforced under the Chemical and Biological Weapons Control and Warfare Elimination Act of 1991 (CBW Act), were planned to come into effect on 27 August. However, these sanctions were not implemented by the Trump administration.

=== European Union and member states ===
European Commission Vice-President Frans Timmermans argued for "unequivocal, unwavering and very strong" European solidarity with the United Kingdom when speaking to lawmakers in Strasburg on 13 March. Federica Mogherini, the High Representative of the Union for Foreign Affairs and Security Policy, expressed shock and offered the bloc's support. MEP and leader of the Alliance of Liberals and Democrats for Europe in the European Parliament Guy Verhofstadt proclaimed solidarity with the British people.

During a meeting in the Foreign Affairs Council on 19 March, all foreign ministers of the European Union declared in a joint statement that the "European Union expresses its unqualified solidarity with the UK and its support, including for the UK's efforts to bring those responsible for this crime to justice." In addition, the statement also pointed out that "The European Union takes extremely seriously the UK Government's assessment that it is highly likely that the Russian Federation is responsible."

Norbert Röttgen, a former federal minister in Angela Merkel's government and current chairman of Germany's parliamentary foreign affairs committee, said the incident demonstrated the need for Britain to review its open-door policy towards Russian capital of dubious origin.

Sixteen EU countries expelled 33 Russian diplomats on 26 March.

The European Union officially sanctioned 4 Russians that were suspected of carrying out the attack on 21 January 2019. The head of the GRU Igor Kostyukov and the deputy head Vladimir Alexseyev were both sanctioned along with Mishkin and Chepiga. The sanctions banned them from travelling to the EU and froze any assets they may have there along with banning any person or company in the EU providing any financial support to those sanctioned.

=== Other non-EU countries ===
Albania, Australia, Canada, Georgia, North Macedonia, Moldova, Norway and Ukraine expelled a total of 27 Russian diplomats who were believed to have been intelligence officers. Australia's PM Malcolm Turnbull said, "We responded with the solidarity we've always shown when Britain's freedoms have been challenged." The New Zealand Government also issued a statement supporting the actions, noting that it would have expelled any Russian intelligence agents who had been detected in the country.

=== NATO ===
NATO issued an official response to the attack on 14 March. The alliance expressed its deep concern over the first offensive use of a nerve agent on its territory since its foundation and said that the attack was in breach of international treaties. It called on Russia to fully disclose its research of the Novichok agent to the OPCW.

Jens Stoltenberg, NATO Secretary General, announced on 27 March that NATO would be expelling seven Russian diplomats from the Russian mission to NATO in Brussels. In addition, 3 unfilled positions at the mission have been denied accreditation from NATO. Russia blamed the US for the NATO response.

=== Joint responses ===
The leaders of France, Germany, the United States and the United Kingdom released a joint statement on 15 March which supported the UK's stance on the incident, stating that it was "highly likely that Russia was responsible" and calling on Russia to provide complete disclosure to the OPCW concerning its Novichok nerve agent program. On 19 March, the European Union also issued a statement strongly condemning the attack and stating it "takes extremely seriously the UK Government's assessment that it is highly likely that the Russian Federation is responsible".

On 6 September 2018, Canada, France, Germany and the United States issued a joint statement saying they had "full confidence" that the Salisbury attack was orchestrated by Russia's Main Intelligence Directorate and "almost certainly approved at a senior government level" and urged Russia to provide full disclosure of its Novichok programme to the OPCW.

== Expulsion of diplomats ==
Countries shown in green expelled Russian diplomats.

By the end of March 2018 a number of countries and other organisations expelled a total of more than 150 Russian diplomats in a show of solidarity with the UK. According to the BBC it was "the largest collective expulsion of Russian intelligence officers in history".

The UK expelled 23 Russian diplomats on 14 March 2018. Three days later, Russia expelled an equal number of British diplomats and ordered the closure of the UK consulate in St. Petersburg and of the British Council in Russia. Nine countries expelled Russian diplomats on 26 March: along with 6 other EU nations, the US, Canada, Ukraine and Albania. The following day, several nations inside and outside of the EU, and NATO responded similarly. By 30 March, Russia expelled an equal number of diplomats of most nations who had expelled Russian diplomats. By that time, Belgium, Montenegro, Hungary and Georgia had also expelled one or more Russian diplomats. Additionally on 30 March, Russia reduced the size of the total UK mission's personnel in Russia to match that of the Russian mission to the UK.

Bulgaria, Luxembourg, Malta, Portugal, Slovakia, Slovenia and the European Union itself have not expelled any Russian diplomats but have recalled their ambassadors from Russia for consultations. Furthermore, Iceland decided to diplomatically boycott the 2018 FIFA World Cup held in Russia.

| Country or organisation | Diplomats expelled | Date announced | Response by Russia | Date announced |
|---|---|---|---|---|
| Albania | 2 | 26 March | 2 diplomats expelled by Russia. | 30 March |
| Australia | 2 | 27 March | 2 diplomats expelled by Russia. | 30 March |
| Belgium | 1 | 27 March | 1 diplomat expelled (the economic attaché). | 4 April |
| Canada | 4^{[a]} | 26 March | 4 diplomats expelled by Russia. | 30 March |
| Croatia | 1 | 26 March | 1 diplomat based in Zagreb declared PNG. | 30 March |
| Czech Republic | 3 | 26 March | 3 diplomats expelled by Russia. | 30 March |
| Denmark | 2 | 26 March | 2 diplomats expelled by Russia. | 30 March |
| Estonia | 1 | 26 March | 1 diplomat expelled by Russia. | 30 March |
| Finland | 1 | 26 March | 1 diplomat expelled by Russia. | 30 March |
| France | 4 | 26 March | 4 diplomats expelled by Russia. | 30 March |
| Germany | 4 | 26 March | 4 diplomats expelled by Russia. | 30 March |
| Georgia | 1 | 30 March | 1 diplomat expelled by Russia. | 13 April |
| Hungary | 1 | 26 March | 1 diplomat expelled by Russia. | 4 April |
| Ireland | 1 | 27 March | 1 diplomat expelled by Russia. | 30 March |
| Italy | 2 | 26 March | 2 diplomats expelled by Russia. | 30 March |
| Latvia | 1 | 26 March | 1 diplomat expelled by Russia. | 30 March |
| Lithuania | 3 | 26 March | 3 diplomats expelled by Russia. | 30 March |
| North Macedonia | 1 | 26 March | 1 diplomat expelled by Russia. | 30 March |
| Moldova | 3 | 27 March | 3 diplomats expelled by Russia. | 30 March |
| Montenegro | 1 | 28 March | 1 diplomat expelled by Russia. | 2 April |
| NATO | 7^{[b]} | 27 March | | |
| Netherlands | 2 | 26 March | 2 diplomats expelled by Russia. | 30 March |
| Norway | 1 | 26 March | 1 diplomat expelled by Russia. | 30 March |
| Poland | 4 | 26 March | 4 diplomats expelled by Russia. | 30 March |
| Romania | 1 | 26 March | 1 diplomat expelled by Russia. | 30 March |
| Spain | 2 | 26 March | 2 diplomats expelled by Russia. | 30 March |
| Sweden | 1 | 26 March | 1 diplomat expelled by Russia. | 30 March |
| Ukraine | 13 | 26 March | 13 diplomats expelled by Russia. | 30 March |
| United Kingdom | 23 | 14 March | 23 UK diplomats expelled by Russia. British consulate in St Petersburg closed. Russian office of the British Council closed. | 17 March |
| United Kingdom | 23 | 14 March | UK diplomatic mission to Russia reduced in size to match Russian mission to UK. Requires the UK to recall a further 27 officials. | 30 March |
| United States | 60,^{[c]} Russian consulates in San Francisco and Seattle closed. | 26 March | 60 US diplomats expelled by Russia. US consulate in St Petersburg closed. | 30 March |
Notes: ^{^[a]} 4 diplomats expelled. 3 pending applications declined.; ^{^[b]} 7 expelled and 3 pending applications declined. Maximum delegation reduced by 10 (from 30 to 20).; ^{^[c]} 48 Russian diplomats expelled from Washington D.C. and 12 expelled from New York.

This cooperation of countries for the mass expulsions of Russian diplomats was used again just four years later in 2022 as the format for the diplomatic expulsions during the Russo-Ukrainian War.

== Aftermath ==
=== Russia ===
The suspected failed poisoning of the Skripals became an embarrassment for Putin, and ended up causing severe damage to Russia's spying organisations. Once Bellingcat exposed the agents' names in September, Moscow then targeted interior ministry leaks that may have helped expose dozens of undercover operatives. It also prompted fury in the Kremlin, the result of which was a purge in the senior ranks of the GRU. Furthermore a number of botched attempts by the GRU were also revealed in October – the Sandworm cybercrime unit had attempted unsuccessfully to hack the UK Foreign Office and the Porton Down facility within a month of the poisonings. Another hack was attempted in April this time on the headquarters of the Organisation for the Prohibition of Chemical Weapons (OPCW) in the Netherlands. The OPCW was investigating the poisonings in the UK, as well the Douma chemical attack in Syria. Four Russian intelligence officers, believed to have been part of a 'GRU cleanup' unit for the earlier failed operations, travelled to The Hague on diplomatic passports. The incident was thwarted by Dutch military intelligence, who had been tipped off by British intelligence officials. The four tried – and failed – to destroy their equipment and were immediately put on a plane back to Moscow. Soon after these events Vladimir Putin's tone changed; at the Russian Energy Forum in Moscow he described Skripal as a "scum and a traitor to the motherland."

The 2018 disclosure of the link on sequential passport numbers issued to GRU agents led to a number of other Russian agents fleeing the west and returning to Russia, including Maria Adela Kuhfeldt Rivera – real name Olga Kolobova, a deep cover agent in Naples. Another was Sergey Vladimirovich Cherkasov, arrested and jailed in Brazil in 2022.

Russia's chief of military intelligence, Igor Korobov and his agency thus came under heavy criticism. Putin was angered over the identification of the agents and the botched failures, and in a meeting apparently scolded Korobov. Soon after this Korobov then collapsed at home in sudden "ill health", (claimed journalist Sergey Kanev) and died not long after in November after a "long illness". GRU defector Viktor Suvorov claimed that 'Korobov was murdered, and everyone in the GRU understood why'. Alexander Golts, a Russian military analyst even admitted that agents 'got a bit too relaxed' and went on to say 'such sloppy work is the reality'.

In February 2019, Bellingcat confirmed that a third GRU officer present in the UK at the time was identified as Denis Vyacheslavovich Sergeev, believed to hold the rank of major general in the GRU. The pattern of his communications while in the UK indicated that he liaised with superior officers in Moscow. In September 2021, Bellingcat revealed that "Russian authorities had taken the unusual measure of erasing any public records" of Sergeev's existence, as well as the other two main suspects in the Skripal poisoning. Sergeev is said to have had a senior position to Chepiga and Mishkin and was likely in charge of coordinating the operation in Salisbury.

In April 2021, Mishkin and Chepiga were named as having been involved in the 2014 Vrbětice ammunition warehouses explosions in the Czech Republic.

The Moscow Times reported a public opinion survey later in the year of the poisonings:

The results of the survey published by the independent Levada Center pollster [in October 2018] say that 28 percent of Russians believe that British intelligence services were behind Skripals' poisoning, with only 3 percent saying they believe their own intelligence officers carried out the attack. Another 56 percent said that "it could have been anyone". Meanwhile, 37 percent of respondents said they knew about the case in detail and 33 percent said they had "heard something" about it, with another 20 percent saying they had heard nothing about the poisoning.

=== United Kingdom ===
In the UK, the response to the poisonings was viewed as a success. Initially there were criticisms of the intelligence failures with the supposed GRU agents gaining access to the UK in the first place. After the Litvinenko poisoning, however, there were calls for more robust action against Russia, should an event like it unfold. The Salisbury poisonings put that robustness into action, rallying significant solidarity from the West. In addition, the response also exposed many Russian intelligence officers, and British officials believe they did real damage to Russian intelligence operations, even if it was short term.

Some of the emergency vehicles used in the response to the poisoning were buried in a landfill site near Cheltenham. In June 2019 it was revealed emergency services spent £891,000 on replacing and discarding contaminated vehicles. South Western ambulance service discarded eight vehicles, comprising three ambulances and five paramedic cars. Wiltshire Police destroyed a total of 16 vehicles at a cost of £460,000.

On 13 September 2018, Chris Busby, a retired research scientist, who is regularly featured as an expert on the Russian government-controlled RT television network, was arrested after his home in Bideford was raided by police. Busby was an outspoken critic of the British Government's handling of the Salisbury poisonings. In one video he said: "Just to make it perfectly clear, there's no way that there's any proof that the material that poisoned the Skripals came from Russia." Busby was held for 19 hours under the Explosive Substances Act 1883, before being released with no further action. Following his release, Busby told the BBC he believed that the fact that two of the officers who had raided his property had felt unwell was explained by "psychological problems associated with their knowledge of the Skripal poisoning".

On 16 September, fears of Novichok contamination flared up again after two people fell ill at a Prezzo restaurant, 300 metres (980 ft) from the Zizzi location where the Skripals had eaten before collapsing. The restaurant, a nearby pub, and surrounding streets were cordoned off, with some patrons under observation or unable to leave the area. The next day, the police said there was "nothing to suggest that Novichok" was the cause of the two people falling ill. However, on 19 September, one of the apparent victims, Anna Shapiro, claimed in The Sun newspaper that the incident had been an attempted assassination against her and her husband by Russia. This article was later removed from The Sun "for legal reasons" and the police began to investigate the incident as a "possible hoax" after the couple were discharged from hospital.

In 2020, senior British officials told The Times that Sergei and Yulia Skripal had been given new identities and state support to start a new life. Both had relocated to New Zealand under the assumed identities.

In May 2021 Nick Bailey, who continued to feel the effects of his poisoning and had retired early as a result, began personal injury litigation against Wiltshire Police; an undisclosed settlement was reached in April 2022.

=== Recovery money ===
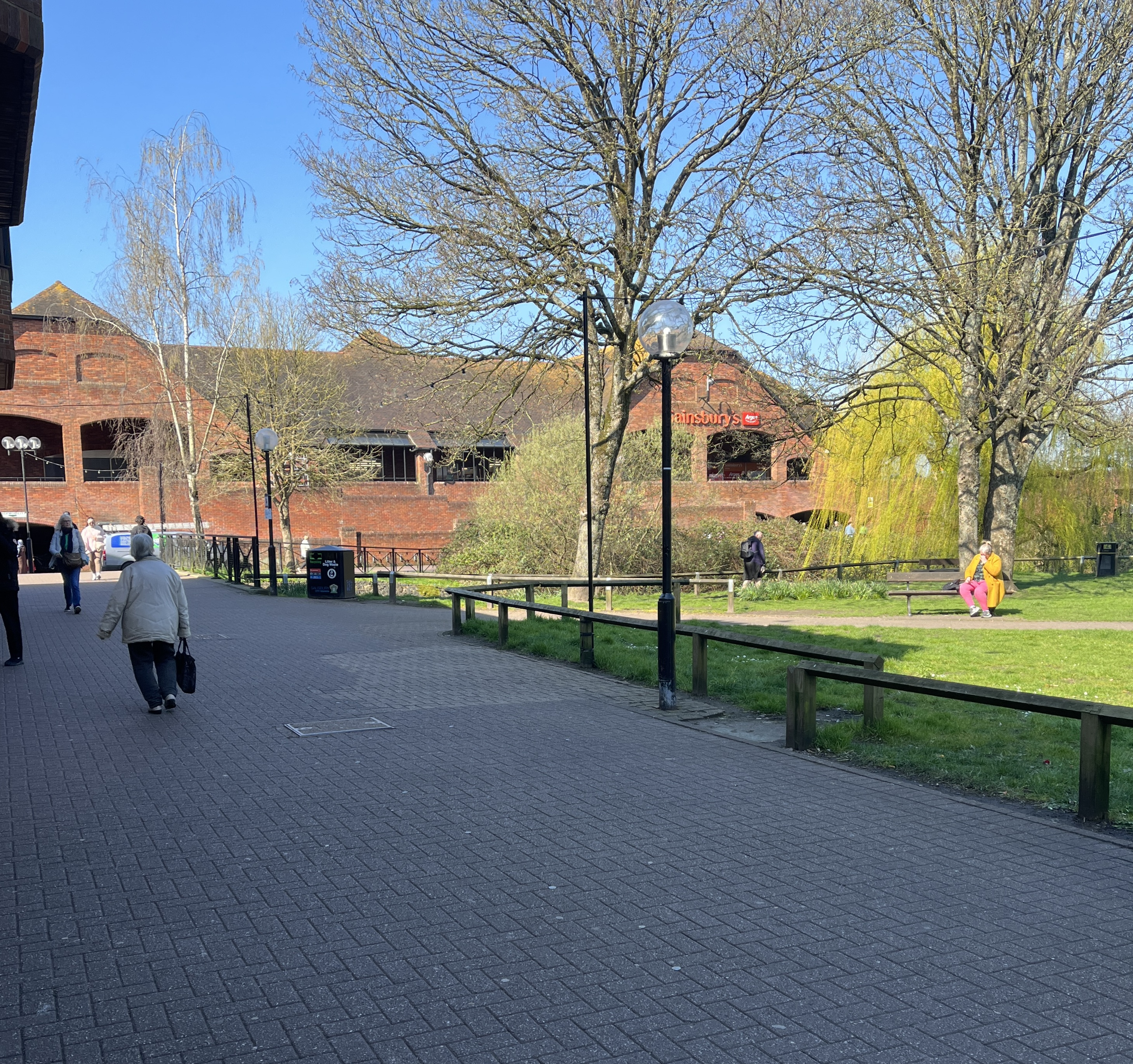
The Maltings, Salisbury, in 2026; the re-paved area (lighter paving stones) marks the position of the bench where the Skripals collapsed. The charity wishing well has also been removed.

As of 17 October 2018, a total of £ 7.5 million had been pledged by government in support of the city and to support businesses, boost tourism and to cover unexpected costs. Wiltshire Council had spent or pledged £ 7,338,974 on recovery, and a further £500,000 "was in the pipeline":

- £ 733,381 towards unexpected closure and loss of footfall to businesses
- £ 404,024 in revenue grants for 74 businesses
- £ 99,891 in capital grants
- £ 229,446 in business rate relief for 56 businesses
- £ 210,491 on events to boost tourism
- £ 500,000 from the Department of Digital, Culture, Media and Sport
- £ 4,000 on dry cleaning or disposal of clothes believed to be contaminated by Novichok
- £ 1 million towards keeping contaminated sites safe
- £ 570,000 recovery money to cover costs of free parking, and free park and ride services
- £ 4.1 million of the money pledged by the Home Office to cover Wiltshire Police's costs. A council commissioner said total policing cost had exceeded £ 10 million. Having £ 6.6 million allocated for funding the police force, he said he hoped to "recoup the full amount from central government".

=== Recognition of responders ===
Deputy Chief Constable Paul Mills and Superintendent Dave Minty of Wiltshire Police were each awarded the Queen's Police Medal in the 2020 New Year Honours for their roles in responding to the incident.

The combined Wiltshire Emergency Services received Wiltshire Life's 2019 "Pride of Wiltshire" award.

== Media depictions ==
The Salisbury Poisonings, a three-part dramatisation of the events in Salisbury and Amesbury, with a focus on the response of local officials and the local community, was broadcast on BBC One in June 2020 and later released on Netflix in December 2021.

A Channel 4 television documentary, Salisbury Poisonings: The Untold Story, was first broadcast in April and May 2026. It consisted of three 47-minute long episodes.

== See also ==
- 2018 Amesbury poisonings
- Intelligence agencies of Russia
- Assassination of Kim Jong-nam by North Korea with VX nerve agent
- Poisoning of Alexander Litvinenko putatively by Russian intelligence agents with Polonium-210
- Poisoning of Alexei Navalny, Russian politician poisoned with Novichok
- Bulgarian umbrella used to assassinate Georgi Markov in London
- Lists of poisonings
- Russian spies in the Russo-Ukrainian War
- Diplomatic expulsions during the Russo-Ukrainian War
- Our Guys in Salisbury
- Zersetzung (decomposition)
