= Loyga, Arkhangelsk Oblast =

Loyga Лойга
- Settlement
- Location within Arkhangelsk Oblast Location within Russia
- Coordinates: 61°04′N 44°36′E
- Country: Russia
- Region: Arkhangelsk Oblast
- District: Ustyansky District
- Time zone: UTC+3:00

Loyga (Russian: Лойга) is a rural locality (a settlement) in Rostovsko-Minskoye Rural Settlement of Ustyansky District, Arkhangelsk Oblast, Russia. The population was 1,303 as of 2010. There are 21 streets.

== Geography ==
Loyga is located 198 km east of Oktyabrsky (the district's administrative centre) by road. Kizema is the nearest rural locality.
