= Anatoly Chepiga =

Russian spy (born 1979)

- Анатолий Владимирович Чепига
- Born: 5 April 1979 (age 47); Nikolayevka, Ivanovsky District, Amur Oblast, Russian SFSR, Soviet Union
- Military career
- Allegiance: Russia
- Service Branch: Main Intelligence Directorate; Spetsnaz GRU
- Service years: Since 2001
- Rank: Polkovnik (equiv. colonel)
- Nicknames: Ruslan Boshirov; Ruslan Tabarov; Andrey Sholkhov
- Conflicts: Second Chechen War; Russo-Ukrainian War
- Awards: Hero of the Russian Federation

Anatoly Vladimirovich Chepiga (Russian: Анатолий Владимирович Чепига, born 5 April 1979) is a colonel in the Russian General Staff's Main Directorate (also known as GRU), the military intelligence service of the Russian Federation. He is reported to have served in the Second Chechen War and the Russo-Ukrainian War. He is known to have operated under the cover names "Ruslan Tabarov" and "Ruslan Boshirov".

== Hero of the Russian Federation award ==
According to Western sources, he received the title Hero of the Russian Federation in 2014, the highest honour awarded by the President of Russia. According to Ukraine, this was probably a reward to Chepiga for being the head of the team providing personal security for the then-deposed President Viktor Yanukovych during the successful "extraction mission" from Ukraine to Russia. Chepiga was reportedly in the Czech Republic in October 2014, using the name Ruslan Boshirov, and Ruslan Tabarov.

The Insider published photographs of the memorial to the graduates of the FEFU – Heroes of the Soviet Union and the Russian Federation behind the monument to Konstantin Rokossovsky on the territory of the school, where the name "Chepiga A. V." is stamped. It is written on the official website of DOSAAF in the Ivanovo district of the Amur Region that "in December 2014, Colonel A. Chepiga was awarded the title of Hero of the Russian Federation for performing a peacekeeping mission". The assignment of this title is mentioned on the portal of graduates of the Far Eastern Higher Combined Arms Command School (DVOKU) and in the article by Olga Kapshtyk, journalist of the Suvorov Onslaught newspaper. Radio Liberty together with Bellingcat published a photo of the boarding school "Heroes Alumni" booth from Odnoklassniki social network, on which "Anatoly Vladimirovich Chepiga is clearly visible, his name, surname and patronymic are well read". In an interview with Business FM online and the TV Rain channel, Alexander Borzhko, chairman of the DOSAAF regional branch of the Amur Region, who was the commander of the DVOKU cadet battalion, where Chepiga served, confirmed that "Chepiga was given the Hero of Russia", although he does not know for what exactly.

A spokesman for the President of Russia, Dmitry Peskov, responded to a question from journalists about whether the information presented in the Bellingcat investigation that Vladimir Putin awarded a medal to a person with that name was checked: "Yes, they checked. I have no information that a person with that name was awarded". RIA Novosti reports that to the clarifying question about whether it is possible that a person receives a reward, but this information is classified and for this reason Peskov does not have such information, he replied: "Once again, we do not want to continue these groundless discussions".

== Reported activities ==
Bellingcat and its investigative partner The Insider claimed that Chepiga was one of the suspects in the poisoning of Sergei and Yulia Skripal and the killing of Dawn Sturgess, having travelled to the United Kingdom together with Alexander Mishkin under the alias of Ruslan Boshirov.

Later in October 2018, Turkish media outlets reported that Chepiga was also possibly linked to the assassination of the Chechen militant field commander Abdulvakhid Edelgiriyev, in late 2015, in Istanbul. Turkish journalists noted the resemblance of Anatoly Chepiga to Andrey Sholkhov, the name used by a person believed to have participated in the assassination.

In April 2021 Chepiga, alongside Alexander Mishkin, was linked to the 2014 Vrbětice ammunition warehouses explosions in the Czech Republic. He is wanted by the Czech Police.

Based on government database leaks, "Agentstvo" established that in 2019, only a year after the failed Skripal assassination attempt and Bellingcat investigation, the family of Anatoly Chepiga changed their surnames to Korulin.

== See also ==
- List of Heroes of the Russian Federation
- Unit 29155
