= Alexander Mishkin =

Russian spy, military doctor

- Алекса́ндр Ми́шкин
- Born: Alexander Yevgenyevich Mishkin; 13 July 1979 (age 47); Loyga, Arkhangelsk Oblast, Russian SFSR, Soviet Union
- Military career
- Allegiance: Russia
- Service: Main Intelligence Directorate
- Rank: Polkovnik (equiv. colonel)
- Nicknames: Alexander Petrov; Nicolaj Popa
- Conflicts: Russo-Ukrainian War

Alexander Yevgenyevich Mishkin (Russian: Алекса́ндр Евге́ньевич Ми́шкин) is a doctor in the Russian General Staff's Main Directorate (also known as GRU), the military intelligence service of the Russian Federation.

On 8 October 2018, investigative website Bellingcat and its partner The Insider claimed that Mishkin was one of the suspects in the poisoning of Sergei and Yulia Skripal and the killing of Dawn Sturgess, having travelled to the United Kingdom under the alias Alexander Petrov. Another alias he has used is Nicolaj Popa.

== Biography ==
Mishkin was born on 13 July 1979, in the village of Loyga, Arkhangelsk Oblast, Soviet Union. He studied at the S. M. Kirov Military Medical Academy.

In 2014 he received the Hero of Russia award and free upscale apartment in Moscow for his GRU activities.

In April 2021 Mishkin, alongside Anatoliy Chepiga, was alleged to be linked to the 2014 Vrbětice ammunition warehouses explosions in the Czech Republic. He is wanted by the Czech Police.

== See also ==
- Unit 29155
