= Mironov =

Mironov/Mironoff (Russian: Миронов), or Mironova (feminine: Миронова) is a Russian last name and may refer to:

== Mironov ==
- Alexander Mironov, cyclist
- Alexandru Mironov (b. 1942), science-fiction author, television personality and politician
- Andrei Mironov (disambiguation), several people
- Arseny Mironov (1917–2019), aerospace scientist, engineer, aircraft pilot
- Boris Mironov (b. 1972), professional ice hockey defenseman
- Dmitri Mironov (b. 1965), retired ice hockey defenseman
- Filipp Mironov (1872–1921), military leader
- Helen Mirren, actress (nee Ilyena Vasilievna Mironov)
- Lev Mironov (1895–1938) NKVD Main Directorate of State Security Department of Economics
- Maxim Mironov (b. 1981), opera singer, tenor
- Pavel Vasilyevich Mironov (1900–1969), lieutenant general, Hero of the Soviet Union
- Pavel Andreyevich Mironov (1919–1945), Hero of the Soviet Union
- Sergey Mironov (b. 1953), politician
- Sergey Mironov (NKVD officer) (1894-1940, born Miron Iosifovich Korol), OGPU and NKVD officer
- Sergey Mironov (1914–1964), aircraft pilot, Hero of the Soviet Union
- Sergey Mironov (footballer) (b. 1983)
- Stepan Mironov (1883–1959), geologist and academician
- Valentin Mironov (1923–1989), army officer, Hero of the Soviet Union
- Vasili Mironov (1919–?), army officer, Hero of the Soviet Union
- Viktor Mironov (1918–1943), aircraft pilot, Hero of the Soviet Union
- Vladimir Mironov, multiple people
- Vyacheslav Mironov (b. 1961), writer and army officer
- Yevgeny Mironov (b. 1966), actor of stage and screen
- Yevgeny Mironov (b. 1948), athlete

== Mironova ==
- Maria Vladimirovna Mironova (1911–1997), actress, mother of the Andrei Mironov
- Maria Mironova (b. 1973), actress, daughter of the Andrei Mironov
- Yekaterina Mironova (b. 1977), skeleton racer
- Yelizaveta Mironova, Soviet sniper in World War II
