= Sapunov =

Sapunov, feminine Sapunova (Russian: Сапунов) is a Russian and Ukrainian surname. Notable people with the surname include:

- Danylo Sapunov (born 1982), Kazakhstani and Ukrainian triathlete
- Nikolai Sapunov (1880–1912), Russian painter
- Tatyana Sapunova (born 1974) a Russian biophysicist
- Yulia Sapunova Yelistratova (born 1988) a professional Ukrainian triathlete
