= Igor Kostyukov =

Russian admiral (b. 1961)

Admiral Igor Kostyukov
- Игорь Костюков
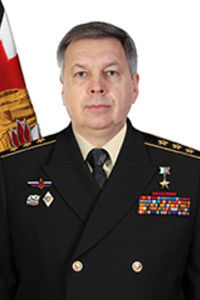
- Official portrait, 2012

Director of the Main Directorate of the General Staff of the Armed Forces
- Incumbent
- Assumed office 22 November 2018
- President: Vladimir Putin
- Defence Minister: Sergey Shoygu; Andrey Belousov
- Preceded by: Igor Korobov

Personal details
- Born: Igor Olegovich Kostyukov; 21 February 1961 (age 65) Amur Oblast, RSFSR, USSR
- Awards: Hero of Russian Federation

Military service
- Allegiance: Soviet Union (to 1991); Russia
- Branch/service: Soviet Navy; Russian Navy
- Rank: Admiral
- Commands: Main Directorate of the General Staff
- Battles/wars: Syrian civil war; Russo-Ukrainian war; Russian invasion of Ukraine

Admiral Igor Olegovich Kostyukov (Note: Russian: И́горь Оле́гович Костюко́в) (born 21 February 1961) is a Russian naval officer who has served as the director of the Main Directorate of the General Staff of the Russian Armed Forces (formerly known as the GRU) since 2018. After graduating from the Military Diplomatic Academy of the Soviet Armed Forces, he spent much of his career in the Main Intelligence Directorate (GRU).

== Early life and education ==
Kostyukov was born on 21 February 1961 in the Amur Oblast, Russian SFSR, Soviet Union. His education included a naval school and the Military Diplomatic Academy of the Soviet Armed Forces (present-day Military University of the Ministry of Defense of the Russian Federation).

== Military career ==
After graduating from the Military Diplomatic Academy, he served in the Main Intelligence Directorate, or GRU (since 2010 known as the Main Directorate, or GU). In 2004 Kostyukov was a military attaché at the Russian embassy in Athens, Greece. In 2017 he was awarded the title Hero of the Russian Federation for his role in the Russian intervention in the Syrian civil war. He eventually became the deputy director of the Main Directorate, with the rank of vice admiral.

=== Director of the Main Directorate ===
Kostyukov was appointed the acting director of the Main Directorate on 22 November 2018 following the death of his predecessor Igor Korobov and is a noted hardliner. This posting also made him the first naval officer in the history of the GRU to lead the organization. He was further promoted to the rank of admiral in 2019. He was in charge of security during President Vladimir Putin's visit to Syria in January 2020.

On 25 March 2022, former Ukrainian Minister of Internal Affairs Arsen Avakov claimed that Kostyukov and Russian defence minister Sergey Shoigu had suffered a sudden illness, stating, "The symptoms of both are exactly the same - heartburn, shortness of breath." The Moscow Times considered Kostyukov to have disappeared from public view in mid-March together with other senior siloviki (key Russian security officials), including Sergey Shoigu, Viktor Zolotov and Valery Gerasimov.

In January and February 2026, he led the Russian delegation in Abu Dhabi, United Arab Emirates, for peace negotiations with Ukraine, where he met with Rustem Umerov and Kyrylo Budanov. In April 2026, he was present at the meeting between Vladimir Putin and Iranian Foreign Minister Abbas Araghchi.

== Personal life ==
In December 2016 he was sanctioned by the United States over alleged Russian interference in the 2016 United States elections. In March 2022, during the 2022 Russian invasion of Ukraine, Kostyukov was placed on a European Union "blacklist".

== Awards and decorations ==
- Hero of the Russian Federation
- Order "For Merit to the Fatherland" (2nd class)
- Order "For Merit to the Fatherland" (3rd class)
- Order "For Merit to the Fatherland" (4th class)
- Order of Alexander Nevsky
- Order of Courage
- Order of Honour

== Notes ==
Military offices
Preceded by Igor Korobov	Director of the Main Directorate of the General Staff of the Armed Forces; 2018–present	Incumbent
