= Boris Ioganson =

Russian Soviet painter

- Борис Иогансон
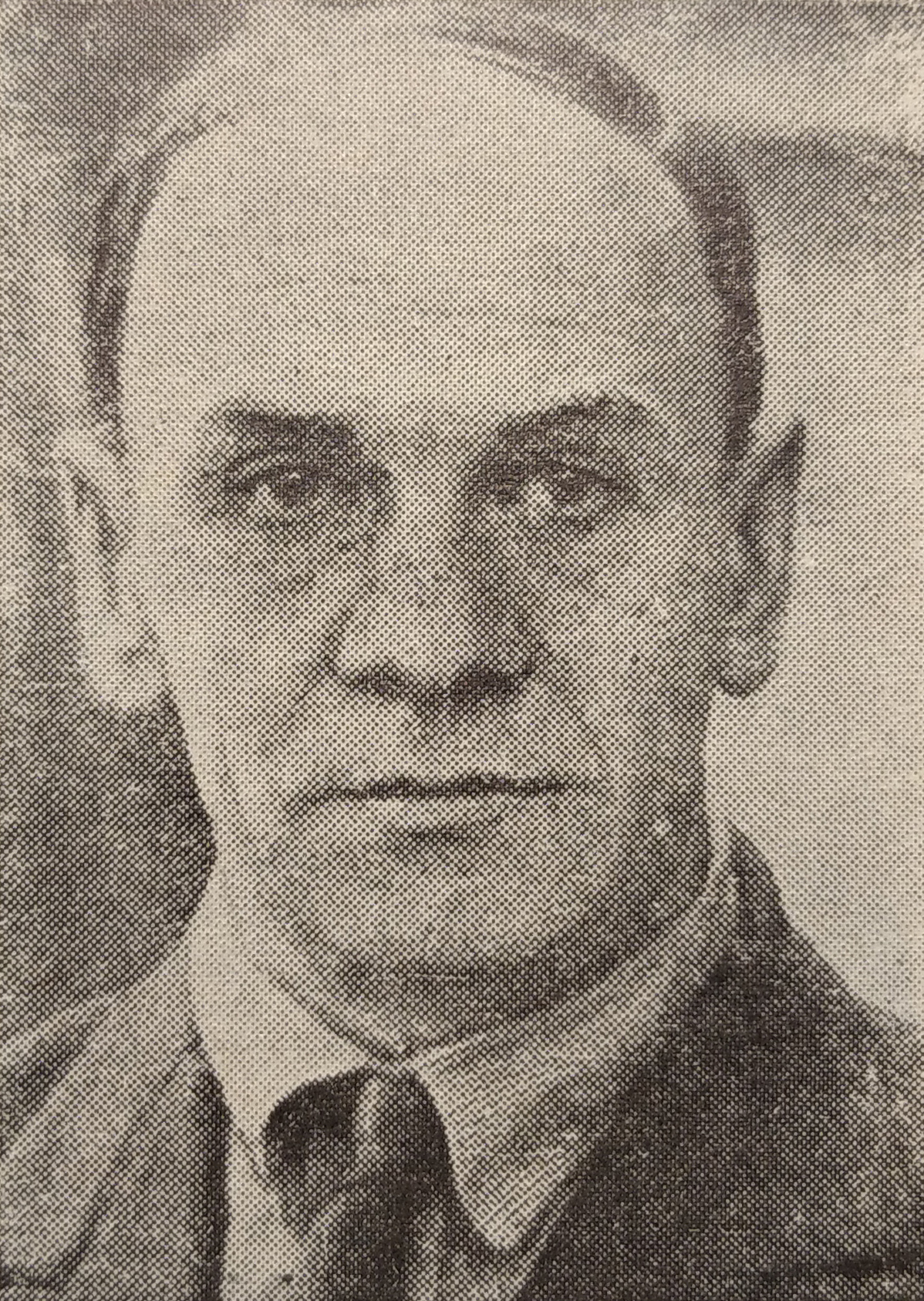
- oganson in 1933
- Born: 13 July 1893; Moscow, Russian Empire
- Died: 25 February 1973 (aged 79); Moscow, Soviet Union
- Resting place: Novodevichy Cemetery
- Education: Moscow School of Painting, Sculpture and Architecture
- Style: Socialist realism
- Awards: Hero of Socialist Labour; Stalin's Prize; Order of Lenin; Order of the Badge of Honour; Medal "For Valiant Labour in the Great Patriotic War 1941–1945"; Medal "In Commemoration of the 250th Anniversary of Leningrad"; People's Artist of the USSR

Boris Vladimirovich Ioganson (Russian: Борис Владимирович Иогансон, 25 July [O.S. 13 July] 1893 – 25 February 1973) also commonly known as B. V. Johanson, was a Russian and Soviet painter and educator. President of the Academy of Arts of the Soviet Union in 1957-1962 and First Secretary of the Union of Painters of the USSR in 1965–1968.

== Biography ==
Ioganson was born on 25 July [O.S. 13 July] 1893 in Moscow. His father's Swedish ancestors Russified the surname "Johansson" into "Ioganson".

In 1919-1922 he worked as a stage designer in the theaters of Krasnoyarsk and Alexandria (Kherson province). During the Civil War, he was an officer in the White Army and served with Kolchak. He ended up in a typhoid hospital and, finally, entered the service of the Red Army. According to the memoirs of the artist A. S. Smirnov, who knew the artist, the last, honored officer in the army of Kolchak.

Ioganson attended the Moscow School of Art, and studied under Kelin, Kasatkin and Malyutin. He was a member of the Society of Young Artists, where he argued for a complete transference of Russian art to Constructivism. He soon abandoned this cause and took up easel painting. In 1922, he helped found the Association of Artists of Revolutionary Russia, and abruptly transferred into the realm of Socialist Realism. Ioganson's work was inspired by that of Repin, that is exhibiting certain features of Impressionism, and was often narrative in nature. Possibly his best-known work was "Interrogation of the Communists" a piece thoroughly representative of Socialist Realism but with piercing elements of Romanticism, in addition to an exploitation of some elements of Futurism. A sense of theatricality is present in his paintings, probably due to his studies of theater design under Korovin.

== Career ==
1951-1954 — Director of the State Tretyakov Gallery.

From 1953 — Vice-president, from January 1957 - Acting President, in 1958-1962 — President of the USSR Academy of Arts.

1954-1957 — Chairman of the Organizing Committee of the Union of Painters of the USSR, in 1965-1968 — First Secretary of the Union of Painters of the USSR.

From 1962 — Editor-in-Chief of the Encyclopedia “Art of Countries and Peoples of the World”.

== Pupils ==
Some graduates of Ilya Repin Leningrad Institute for Painting, Sculpture and Architecture (now known as St. Petersburg Institute for Painting, Sculpture and Architecture) studied at the Boris Ioganson Workshop (active from 1930 to 1950s) in Moscow. His notable students included Alexey Eriomin, Nikolai Baskakov, Valery Vatenin, Nina Veselova, Maya Kopitseva, Oleg Lomakin, Valentina Monakhova, Nikolai Mukho, Anatoli Nenartovich, Mikhail Natarevich, Semion Rotnitsky, Mikhail Trufanov, Yuri Tulin, Knarik Vardanyan, and Felix Lembersky.

== Bibliography ==
- Sergei V. Ivanov. Unknown Socialist Realism. The Leningrad School. – Saint Petersburg: NP-Print, 2007. - p. 447. ISBN 5-901724-21-6, ISBN 978-5-901724-21-7.
