= General Kozlov =

General Kozlov may refer to:

- Dmitry Timofeyevich Kozlov (1896–1967), Soviet Army lieutenant general
- Oleg Kozlov (born 1963), Russian Army major general
- Vasily Kozlov (politician) (1903–1967), Soviet Army major general
