= Sapunova =

Sapunova is a Russian surname. Notable people with the surname include:

- Tatyana Sapunova (born 1974), Russian biophysicist
- Yuliya Sapunova (born 1988), Ukrainian triathlete

== See also ==
- Sapunov
