= Igor Sergun =

Russian military officer (1957–2016)

- Игорь Сергун
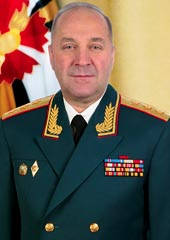
- Official portrait, 2015

Director of the Main Directorate of the General Staff of the Armed Forces
- In office 26 December 2011 – 3 January 2016
- Preceded by: Alexander Shlyakhturov
- Succeeded by: Igor Korobov

Personal details
- Born: 28 March 1957 Podolsk, Moscow Oblast, Soviet Union
- Died: 3 January 2016 (aged 58) Moscow, Russia
- Education: Moscow Higher Military Command School; General Staff Academy
- Awards: Hero of the Russian Federation; Order of Military Merit; Order of Honour; Medal for Battle Merit; Medal "In Commemoration of the 850th Anniversary of Moscow"; Jubilee Medal "60 Years of the Armed Forces of the USSR"; Jubilee Medal "70 Years of the Armed Forces of the USSR"; Medal "For Impeccable Service"

Military service
- Allegiance: Soviet Union (to 1991); Russia
- Branch/service: Soviet Army; Russian Ground Forces
- Years of service: 1973–2016
- Rank: Colonel general
- Battles/wars: Cold War; First Chechen War; Kosovo War; Second Chechen War; Annexation of Crimea; Russian military intervention in the Syrian Civil War

Igor Dmitrievich Sergun (Note: In this name that follows East Slavic naming customs, the patronymic is Dmitrievich and the family name is Sergun.) (Russian: Игорь Дмитриевич Сергун, IPA: [ˈiɡərʲ ˈdmʲitrʲɪjɪvʲɪtɕ sʲɪrˈɡun]; 28 March 1957 – 3 January 2016) was a Russian military officer who was a director of GRU, Russia's military intelligence service, from 2011 until his death in January 2016. He was promoted to colonel general on 21 February 2015.

== Biography ==
Igor Sergun was born on 28 March 1957 in Podolsk, Moscow Oblast. He completed the Moscow Suvorov Military School and the Moscow Higher Military Command School. He was in active military service from 1973, in the GRU from 1984.

There is no information in the public domain on him participating in the Soviet military campaign in Afghanistan in the 1980s, or in the Chechen Wars in the 1990s, or any other actual combat.

In 1998, Sergun had a rank of colonel and served as military attaché in Tirana, Albania.

On 26 December 2011, Sergun was appointed Director of GRU, which had in 2010 received a new official name, the Main Directorate of the General Staff. He also became Deputy Chief of the General Staff of the Armed Forces of the Russian Federation.

He was promoted to Lieutenant-General by a presidential decree on 31 August 2012 and Colonel General on 21 February 2015.

In 2014, Sergun was put on the sanction lists of the EU and the U.S. as a person ″responsible for the activity of GRU officers in Eastern Ukraine″.

He was last spotted by media at Bocharov Ruchey, as one of the Russian delegation for negotiations with King Abdullah II of Jordan, on 24 November 2015.

== GRU Director ==
=== Background ===
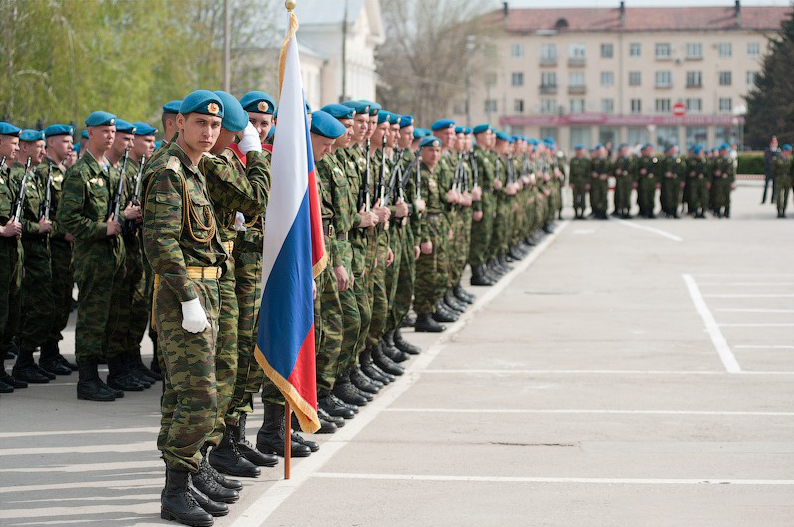
3rd Spetsnaz Brigade on parade, 9 May 2011.

Perceived poor performance of the GRU in the Russo-Georgian War, the rivalry amongst Russia's intelligence services as well as the overall reform of the Russian Armed Forces initiated in the late 2000s under the Defence Minister Anatoliy Serdyukov led to the downsizing and reduced standing of the GRU and eventual dismissal of the GRU chief Valentin Korabelnikov in April 2009 over his publicly voiced disagreement with the reforms. In October 2010, the Defence Ministry announced that the GRU Spetsnaz would be subordinated to the operational-strategic commands, in other words it would be transferred from the General Staff to the Ground Forces Russia's internal security service, the FSB, which Vladimir Putin as former head thereof had a special interest in, along with the external service, the SVR, were encroaching on the GRU's turf.

The dismissal of Serdyukov as Minister of Defense in November 2012, after he was exposed as having used the army to build a private road, boosted morale and signaled a return to high military spending; Spetnaz units are believed to have been given priority in making improvements.

=== Political turmoil in Russia and Ukraine and inter-agency rivalry ===
The beginning of Sergun's tenure as the GRU chief coincided with the start of mass protests in December 2011, which were being promoted in online social media and which Vladimir Putin accused the U.S. secretary of state Hillary Clinton of inciting. The FSB's inability to comprehend high tempo social-media agitation cost it some of the favour with Putin. Although the former head of GRU cyberwarfare was responsible for revealing FSB technical support of Shaltai Boltai (supposed anti-establishment hacking group that exposed the Internet Research Agency) as far as is known the IRA, which dates from the mass 2011–2013 Russian protests and disrupts social media comment threads critical of Putin, had never been run by the GRU. So called "Psychographics" and data mined targeting of advertisements as used by Cambridge Analytica was not practiced by the IRA, and its output in English has been characterized as the stilted product of a "troll farm" although that term has been criticized as failing to convey sophisticated manipulation by a foreign state.

With the annexation of Crimea and the speed and efficiency of the "little green men" took control, it was taken as evidence that Main Directorate operations, technology, signals, and security had drastically improved. Under the previous GRU Director, Valentin Korabelnikov, there was criticism of a focus on kinetic operations rather than gathering intelligence, but as the political situation deteriorated for Russia in Ukraine, and the FSB analysis that rebellion across the Donbas region could be autarkical proved faulty, the Main Directorate Spetsnaz troops became an indispensable cadre for the insurgency. Apart from the use of drones for real time reconnaissance and artillery strike, Unit 26165 is thought to have interfered with Ukrainian communications. Sergun supervised the deniable undercover units that America struggled to find an effective response to. The local partisan-proxies and Russian artillery were utilized in a combination of low intensity and siege warfare "to transfer military power into political progress, while obfuscating the associated cost" as in the Second Battle of Donetsk Airport.

=== Sergun and his U.S. counterparts ===
In the opinion of Peter Zwack, who from 2012 until 2014 served as the United States Senior Defense Official and Attache to the Russian Federation, before U.S.–Russia relations deteriorated drastically in early 2014, Sergun made efforts to promote MI to MI contacts between Russia and the U.S., which during 2012 and 2013 included meetings between U.S. and Russian intelligence chiefs from strategic regional and global commands that took place in cities across Russia.

In June 2013, Sergun hosted Michael Flynn, then the Director of the U.S. Defense Intelligence Agency, at GRU headquarters, where Flynn gave a lecture to GRU officers and took questions and was entertained at a formal dinner.

== Death and tributes ==
On 4 January 2016, the web site of the Russian president released a short excerpt of President Vladimir Putin's telegram that expressed condolences to Sergun's relatives; the telegram was published by the Interfax news agency, which, citing the Kremlin's press service, also said that Sergun had "died unexpectedly on 3 January 2016, aged 59", without citing place and cause of death. BBC's report on his death said that "circumstances of his death [were] not clear" and quoted experts who credited him with the GRU having "recovered some of its former prestige", which had been reduced by drastic cuts to the service shortly before he took over. Two publications by the Russian tabloid Komsomolskaya Pravda posted on 4 January, without reference to sources, in their subtitles, cited Moscow and heart attack for place and cause of death.

A source in the General Staff cited by the Russian daily Kommersant credited Sergun with leaving behind an "exceedingly effective and balanced directorate".

In May 2016, he was posthumously awarded the title of the Hero of the Russian Federation.

=== Questions over location of death ===
Two days after his death, the U.S.-based global intelligence company Stratfor questioned the official version of Sergun's death citing an unattributed report that alleged he had died on New Year's Day in Lebanon. In early March 2016, a similar theory was suggested by the Lebanese daily Al Akhbar that alleged Sergun was killed when on a visit to Beirut in a "complicated secret mission" carried out by unnamed Arab and Middle Eastern intelligence agencies. His death was cited as one in a series of "dozens of high-profile" Russian officials' (as well as Putin critics') sudden deaths, such as Vitaly Churkin's (February 2017), in "the past three years in Russia and abroad in suspicious circumstances" in a publication by USA Today of 2 May 2017. The Kremlin spokesman Dmitry Peskov dismissed such media reports as rumours.

During a 24 January 2017 questioning by FBI agents at the White House, then-U.S. National Security Advisor Michael Flynn said "he called Ambassador Kislyak following Sergun's death in Lebanon". After Flynn's FBI interview summary was released on 17 December 2018, the Russian Defense Ministry issued a denial that Sergun had died in Lebanon, calling the story "conspiracy nonsense".

== State awards ==
- Order of Military Merit
- Order of Honour
- Medal for Battle Merit
- Medal "In Commemoration of the 850th Anniversary of Moscow"
- Jubilee Medal "60 Years of the Armed Forces of the USSR"
- Jubilee Medal "70 Years of the Armed Forces of the USSR"
- Medal "For Impeccable Service", 1st class
- Medal of the Order "For Merit", 2nd class
- Medal "For strengthening of the state system of protection of information", 2nd class
- "Medal "Participant of Operation March-Shot Bosnia-Kosovo 12 June 1999"

== See also ==
- List of Heroes of the Russian Federation

== Notes ==
Political offices
Preceded by Alexander Shlyakhturov	GRU Chief; 26 December 2011 – 3 January 2016	Succeeded by Igor Korobov
