= Yelizaveta =

Yelizaveta is a Russian feminine given name, and is a cognate of Elizabeth. Notable people with the name include:

- Grand Duchess Yelizaveta Mikhaylovna of Russia (1826–1845), the second child and daughter of Grand Duke Mikhail Pavlovich of Russia
- Yelizaveta Alekseyevna Tarakanova (1753–1775), pretender to the Russian throne
- Yelizaveta Belogradskaya (1739 – c. 1764), a Russian Imperial Court opera singer
- Yelizaveta Dementyeva (born 1928), Soviet sprint canoeist who competed in the late 1950s
- Yelizaveta Kovalskaya (1851 or 1849–1943), Russian revolutionary, narodnik, and founding member of Black Repartition
- Yelizaveta Kozhevnikova (born 1973), Russian freestyle skier and Olympic medalist
- Yelizaveta Lavrovskaya (1845–1919), Russian mezzo-soprano
- Yelizaveta Mironova, Soviet sniper during the Second World War
- Yelizaveta Tarakhovskaya (1891–1968), Russian poet, playwright, translator, and author of children's books
