= GRU (Russian Federation) =

Russian military intelligence agency

Main Directorate of the General Staff of the Armed Forces of the Russian Federation
- Главное управление Генерального штаба Вооружённых сил Российской Федерации; Glavnoye upravleniye General'nogo shtaba Vooruzhonnykh sil Rossiyskoy Federatsii
- Emblem of the G.R.U. of the General Staff of the Russian Armed Forces

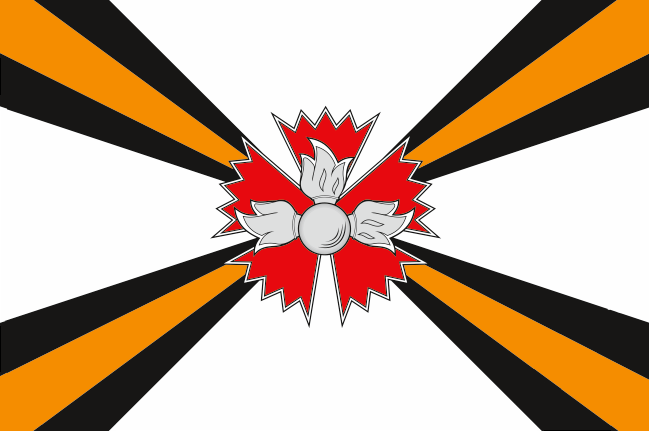
- Flag of the G.R.U. of the General Staff of the Russian Armed Forces

Agency overview
- Formed: 7 May 1992; 34 years ago
- Preceding agency: GRU (Soviet Union)
- Headquarters: Headquarters of the Main Intelligence Directorate, Moscow
- Employees: Classified
- Annual budget: Classified
- Agency executive: Admiral Igor Kostyukov, Director
- Parent agency: General Staff of the Armed Forces of the Russian Federation
- Child agencies: Svyazinformsoyuz Company; Directorate for Space Intelligence; Intelligence Directorate of the Main Staff of the Russian Air Force; Intelligence Directorate of the Main Staff of the Russian Navy; GRU Special Forces Units
- Website: Ministry of Defense Website

The Main Directorate of the General Staff of the Armed Forces of the Russian Federation, (Note: Russian: Главное управление Генерального штаба Вооружённых сил Российской Федерации, ГУГШ ВС РФ, romanized: Glavnoye upravleniye General'nogo shtaba Vooruzhonnykh sil Rossiyskoy Federatsii) formerly the Main Intelligence Directorate, (Note: Russian: Главное разведывательное управление, ГРУ, romanized: Glavnoye razvedyvatel'noye upravleniye, GRU; pronounced [ˈɡlavnəjə rɐzˈvʲɛdɨvətʲɪlʲnəjə ʊprɐˈvlʲenʲɪjə]) and commonly known by its previous abbreviation GRU, (Note: Russian: ГРУ; Russian pronunciation: [ɡɨ̞rɨ̞ˈu]) is the foreign military intelligence agency of the General Staff of the Armed Forces of the Russian Federation tasked with advancing military intelligence through collecting and analyzing intelligence from around the world and conducting clandestine and covert operations. The GRU controls the military intelligence service and maintains its own special forces units.

Unlike Russia's other security and intelligence agencies – such as the Foreign Intelligence Service (SVR), the Federal Security Service (FSB), and the Federal Protective Service (FSO) – whose heads report directly to the president of Russia (see Intelligence agencies of Russia), the director of the GRU is subordinate to the Russian military command, reporting to the Minister of Defence and the Chief of the General Staff.

The directorate is reputedly Russia's largest foreign intelligence agency, and is distinguished among its counterparts for its willingness to execute riskier "complicated, high stakes operations". According to unverified statements by Stanislav Lunev, a defector from the GRU, in 1997 the agency deployed six times as many agents in foreign countries as the SVR, and commanded some 25,000 Spetsnaz troops.

== History ==
=== Origins and early history ===
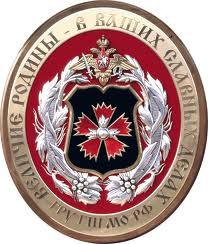
GRU Official emblem (until 2009) with motto engraved: "Greatness of the Motherland in your glorious deeds"

The first Russian body for military intelligence dates from 1810, in the context of the Napoleonic Wars raging across Europe, when War Minister Michael Andreas Barclay de Tolly proposed to Emperor Alexander I of Russia the formation of the Expedition for Secret Affairs under the War Ministry (Russian: Экспедиция секретных дел при военном министерстве); two years later, it was renamed the Special Bureau (Russian: Особая канцелярия). (Note: И первым таким органом стала Экспедиция секретных дел при военном министерстве, созданная по инициативе Барклая-де-Толли в январе 1810 г. В январе 1812 г. ее переименовали в Особенную канцелярию при военном министре. (And the first such body The Expedition of Secret Affairs under the Ministry of War was created on the initiative of the Barclay de Tolly in January 1810. In January 1812 it was renamed the Special Chancellery under the Minister of War.))

In 1815, the Bureau became the First Department under the General Chief of Staff. In 1836, the intelligence functions were transferred to the Second Department under the General Chief of Staff. After many name-changes through the years, in April 1906, the Military intelligence was carried out by the Fifth Department under the General Chief of Staff of the War Ministry.

The GRU's first predecessor in Soviet Russia was established by the secret order signed on 5 November 1918 by Jukums Vācietis, the first commander-in-chief of the Red Army (RKKA), and by Ephraim Sklyansky, deputy to Leon Trotsky, the civilian leader of the Red Army. (Since 2006, the Russian Federation has officially observed the date of 5 November as the professional holiday of military intelligence in Russia.) (Note: Russian: День военного разведчика) The military human intelligence service thus established was originally known as the Registration Agency (Registrupravlenie, or Registrupr; Russian: Региструпр) of the Field Headquarters of the Revolutionary Military Council of the Republic; Semyon Aralov was its first head. Its early history was marked by a series of reorganisations influenced by the Soviet-Polish War, the consolidation and restablisation of the Soviet Union, and the general reorganisation of the Red Army; this included changes to its name, status, and responsibilities.

Throughout most of the interwar period, the men and women who worked for Red Army Intelligence called it either the Fourth Department, the Intelligence Service, the Razvedupr, or the RU. […] As a result of the re-organisation [in 1926], carried out in part to break up Trotsky's hold on the army, the Fourth Department seems to have been placed directly under the control of the State Defense Council (Gosudarstvennaia komissiia oborony, or GKO), the successor of the RVSR. Thereafter its analysis and reports went directly to the GKO and the Politburo, apparently even bypassing the Red Army Staff.

— Raymond W. Leonard

The first head of the Fourth Directorate was Yan Karlovich Berzin, who remained in the post from March 1924 until April 1935 (in 1938, he was arrested and executed as a Trotskyite during the Stalinist purges). Military intelligence was known for its fierce independence from the rival "internal intelligence organizations", such as the NKVD, and later KGB; however, public statements of Soviet military intelligence veterans state the Fourth Directorate, and later GRU, had always been operationally subordinate to the KGB. Military intelligence was headquartered in a small and nondescript complex west of the Kremlin, whereas the NKVD was in the very centre of Moscow, next to the building that housed People's Commissariat for Foreign Affairs at the bottom of Kuznetsky Most. Consequently, Soviet military intelligence came to be known in Soviet diplomats' cant as distant neighbours (Russian: дальние соседи) as opposed to the near neighbours of the NKVD/KGB.

=== Cold War ===
The GRU was created under its current name and form by Joseph Stalin in February 1942, less than a year after the invasion of the Soviet Union by Nazi Germany. From April 1943 the GRU handled human intelligence exclusively outside the USSR. In addition to operations against the Axis powers, GRU is credited with having infiltrated the British nuclear weapon programme and up to 70 American government and scientific institutions.

During the Cold War, the GRU, like many of its Western rivals, maintained rezidenturas, or resident spies, worldwide; these included both "legal" agents, based at Soviet embassies with official diplomatic cover, and "illegal" officers without cover. It also maintained a signals intelligence (SIGINT) station in Lourdes, Cuba and other Soviet-bloc countries. Though less well known than the KGB, with which it shared a fierce rivalry, GRU is known to have been involved in several high-profile episodes; this included opening backchannel negotiations with the U.S. government during the Cuban Missile Crisis and contributing to the Profumo scandal that partly contributed to the fall of a British administration. GRU was distinguished for its "closer ties with revolutionary movements and terrorist groups, greater experience with weapons and explosives, and even tougher training for recruits"; new recruits were allegedly shown footage of a traitorous officer being fed into a crematorium alive.

The existence of the GRU was not publicized during the Soviet era, though it was mentioned in the 1931 memoirs of the first OGPU defector, Georges Agabekov, and described in detail in the 1939 autobiography, I Was Stalin's Agent, by Walter Krivitsky, the most senior Red Army intelligence officer ever to defect. GRU became widely known in Russia, and outside narrow confines of the Western intelligence community, during perestroika, due partly to the writings of "Viktor Suvorov" (Vladimir Rezun), a GRU officer who defected to Great Britain in 1978 and wrote about his experiences in the Soviet military and intelligence services. According to Suvorov, even the General Secretary of the Communist Party of the Soviet Union, the country's de facto leader, needed to undergo a security screening to enter GRU headquarters.

=== Post-Soviet period ===
Following the dissolution of the USSR in December 1991, the GRU continued as an important part of Russia's intelligence services, especially since it was the only one to more or less maintain operational and institutional continuity: the KGB had been dissolved after aiding a failed coup in 1991 against the then Soviet President Mikhail Gorbachev. It is now succeeded by the Foreign Intelligence Service (SVR) and the Federal Security Service (FSB).

Evidencing its growing strategic profile, in 2006 the GRU moved to a new headquarters complex at Khoroshovskoye Shosse, which cost 9.5 billion rubles to build and incorporates 70,000 square meters. In April 2009, President Dmitry Medvedev fired then-GRU head Valentin Korabelnikov, who had headed the GRU since 1997, reportedly over Korabelnikov's objections to proposed reforms. Pursuant to these reforms, the following year, the official name of the unit was changed from "GRU" to the "Main Directorate of the Russian General Staff", or "G.U."; however, "GRU" continues to be commonly used in media. The GRU underwent severe reductions in funding and personnel following the 2008 Russo-Georgian War, during which it failed to discover the more advanced anti-aircraft weapons obtained by Georgia. However, it continued to play a key role in several Russian operations, including in Russia's intervention in eastern Ukraine in 2014 and the subsequent annexation of Crimea. GRU agents were also implicated in numerous cyberwarfare operations across the West, including in the U.S., France, and Germany. Many of its successes took place during the tenure of Igor Sergun, who headed the service from late 2011 until his death in early January 2016. Sergun's sudden death shortly after the restoration of the GRU's influence led to speculations of foul play by Russian adversaries.

The tenure of Sergun's successor, Igor Korobov, was marked by what some news media construed as multiple high-profile setbacks, such as the thwarted 2016 coup d'état attempt in Montenegro, the failed 2018 Salisbury poisoning, and an unprecedented number of disclosed GRU agents. Korobov died on 21 November 2018, "after a serious and prolonged illness", according to the official Defence Ministry statement. His death provoked speculations and unverified reports of him having fallen ill in October that year following a harsh dressing-down from President Vladimir Putin. However, former CIA station-chief Daniel Hoffman cautioned in 2017 that some of the Russian intelligence's recent operations that appeared to be botched might have been intended for discovery. Similarly, in 2019, Eerik-Niiles Kross, a former Estonian intelligence official, opined that GRU's apparent sloppiness "has become part of the psychological warfare. It's not that they have become that much more aggressive. They want to be felt. It's part of the game."

On 2 November 2018, while marking the GU's 100th anniversary, President Putin proposed restoring the agency's former name: Главное разведывательное управление (GRU).

== Organizational structure ==
Since 1977, the director of the Intelligence Directorate of the Main Staff of the Russian Navy has also typically been the deputy director of the GRU. The Navy Intelligence Directorate was made subordinate to the fifth directorate of the GRU.

=== 1997 organization ===
The GRU is organized into numerous directorates, directions, and sections. According to the data available in open sources in 1997, the structure of the Main Directorate consists of at least 12 known directorates and several other auxiliary departments.

- The First Directorate is responsible for intelligence in Europe.
- The Second Directorate is geographically responsible for the Western Hemisphere.
- The Third Directorate is geographically responsible for Asia.
- The Fourth Directorate is geographically responsible for Africa and the Middle East.
- The Fifth Directorate is responsible for military operations intelligence, including naval and air force intelligence.
- The Sixth Directorate is responsible for signals intelligence (SIGINT) and space intelligence. It uses over 20 different types of aircraft, a fleet of 60 SIGINT collection vessels, satellites, and ground stations to collect signals intelligence. Together with FAPSI, the GRU operates SIGINT collection facilities in over 60 diplomatically protected facilities throughout the world. These agencies also operate ground collection facilities within former Soviet states' territory.
- The Seventh Directorate is responsible specifically for NATO.
- The Eighth Directorate deals with special purpose administration.
- The Ninth Directorate is responsible for military technology.
- The Tenth Directorate is the department of war economics.
- The Eleventh Directorate is the department of strategic doctrines and arms.
- The Twelfth Directorate is responsible for information warfare.

=== 2020 organization ===
The American Congressional Research Service, based on interviews with various experts, gives the following organization of the GRU, although it acknowledges that the organization's true structure is "a closely guarded secret."

4 Regional Directorates:

- First Directorate: European Union
- Second Directorate: North and South America, the United Kingdom, Australia, and New Zealand
- Third Directorate: Asia
- Fourth Directorate: Africa

11 Mission-Specific Directorates:

- Fifth Directorate: Operational Intelligence
- Sixth Directorate: Electronic/Signals intelligence
  - GRU cyber capabilities, Unit 26165 (allegedly the hacking group Fancy Bear/APT28/STRONTIUM), and Unit 74455 (allegedly the Sandworm Team)
- Seventh Directorate: NATO
- Eighth Directorate: Russian Spetsnaz (special forces)
- Ninth Directorate: Military technology
- Tenth Directorate: Military economy
- Eleventh Directorate: Strategic doctrine
- Twelfth Directorate: Information Operations (separate from American information operations)
- Space Intelligence Directorate
- Operational and Technical Directorate
- External Relations Department

The New York Times in 2026 identified the Twentieth Directorate as operating in Tokyo, Japan.

=== Units ===
==== Unit 26165 ====
Unit 26165, also known as Fancy Bear, STRONTIUM, and APT28, is a cyber operations/hacking group. Unit 26165 was originally created during the Cold War as the 85th Main Special Service Center, responsible for military intelligence cryptography. The Netherlands has accused Unit 26165 of also being involved in the attempted 2018 OPCW hack and targeting its investigation into the 2014 downing of Malaysia Airlines Flight 17 (MH17), for which the Dutch investigation blames pro-Russian Ukrainian separatists armed with surface-to-air missiles by Russia.

==== Unit 29155 ====
Unit 29155 is tasked with foreign assassinations and other covert activities aimed at destabilizing European countries. The Unit is thought to have operated in secret since at least 2008, though its existence only became publicly known in 2019. It is commanded by Maj. Gen. Andrei Vladimirovich Averyanov and based at the headquarters of the 161st Special Purpose Specialist Training Center in eastern Moscow. Its membership included decorated veterans from the Soviet war in Afghanistan and Russia's most recent series of wars in Chechnya and Ukraine. It has been linked to the 2014 Russian annexation of Crimea, the 2015 poisonings of Bulgarian arms dealer Emilian Gebrev (also spelled Emilyan), the 2016 Montenegro coup attempt, and the poisoning of Russian defector Sergei Skripal. Unit 29155 operatives have also been tracked to Switzerland during the time (early 2018) other GRU units hacked the World Anti-Doping Agency (then investigating state-sponsored doping by Russian Olympians) and attempted to hack the Organisation for the Prohibition of Chemical Weapons (then investigating the Douma chemical attack by Russia-backed Bashar al-Assad and evidence in the Skripal case). Spain has also investigated the travel of Unit 29155 member Denis Sergeev (who has also used the name Sergei Fedotov) to Barcelona in 2017 around the time of the 2017 Catalan independence referendum. The unit is also accused of being behind the alleged Russian bounty program where Taliban militants were paid to kill American troops, although the program's existence is uncertain, unproven, and unverified.

The FBI, CISA, and NSA concluded that cyber actors linked to the GRU's 161st Specialist Training Center (Unit 29155) had conducted cyber operations targeting global entities for espionage, sabotage, and reputational harm since at least 2020. Starting on 13 January 2022, these actors deployed the WhisperGate malware against several Ukrainian organizations. The advisory detailed the tactics and techniques used by Unit 29155 and offered further analysis of WhisperGate.

==== Unit 35555 ====
Unit 35555 is a socio-psychological research laboratory linked to supporting Wagner and other private military companies.

==== Unit 54777 ====
Unit 54777, alternately called the 72nd Special Service Center, is one of the GRU's primary psychological warfare capabilities. Unit 54777 retains several front organizations, including InfoRos and the Institute of the Russian Diaspora. The unit originated from Soviet GLAVPUR (Glavnoye Politicheskoye Upravlenie, or the Main Political Department) and was created in early 1990s and notably employed colonel Aleksandr Viktorovich Golyev, whose memoirs were published in 2020 along with other GRU documents. In the 1990s, the unit focused on pro-Soviet disinformation in newly split republics such as Lithuania and Chechnya. In later years the unit covered a broad range of activities from running NGOs targeting Russian expatriates in Western countries (InfoRos, Institute of the Russian Diaspora, World Coordinating Council of Russian Compatriots Living Abroad, Foundation for Supporting and Protecting the Rights of Compatriots Living Abroad) and manipulating public opinion in Russia and abroad in preparation for armed conflicts such as in Georgia, Donbas or Syria.

==== Unit 74455 ====
Unit 74455, also known as the Sandworm Team or the Main Center for Technologies, used various fictitious online identities (DCLeaks and Guccifer 2.0) to coordinate the release of the politically sensitive stolen documents with WikiLeaks for "maximum political impact" starting on the eve of the 2016 Democratic National Convention. Its guilt has been reported by American media and a Senate Intelligence Committee investigation. In October 2020, the United States Department of Justice indicted six Unit 74455 GRU officers for multiple cyberattacks, including the December 2015 Ukraine power grid cyberattack, the 2017 Macron e-mail leaks, the 2017 NotPetya attacks, the 2018 Winter Olympics hack (for which the GRU attempted to frame North Korea), several 2018 attacks on Skripal case investigators, and a 2018–2019 cyberattack campaign against Georgian media and the Georgian Parliament.

=== SATCOM ===
Since the mid-1970s the GRU has maintained a satellite communications interception post near Andreyevka, located approximately 80 kilometres (50 miles) from Spassk-Dalny, Primorsky Krai.

== GRU illegals ==
According to a Western assessment of the GRU seen by Reuters in the autumn of 2018, the GRU had a long-running program to run "illegal" spies, i.e. those who work without diplomatic cover and who live under an assumed identity in foreign countries for years. The assessment said: "It plays an increasingly important role in Russia's development of Information Warfare (both defensive and offensive). It is an aggressive and well-funded organization which has the direct support of – and access to – President Vladimir Putin, allowing freedom in its activities and leniency with regards to diplomatic and legislative scrutiny."

The United States alleges that the GRU, as well as the SVR (its civilian foreign intelligence counterpart), makes use of both legal (intelligence officers with diplomatic protection/official government roles) and illegal operatives.

The "Havana syndrome," which affected U.S. diplomats and spies worldwide, was possibly linked to GRU’s Unit 29155, as reported by the Insider. Symptoms included migraines and dizziness. Investigations suggested incidents might have occurred as early as 2016, with potential prior events in Frankfurt, Germany. The U.S. Congress passed the Havana Act in 2021 to provide aid to affected personnel and families.

== Special Forces of the Main Directorate ==
Commonly known as the Spetsnaz GRU, it was formed in 1949. Following the dissolution of the Soviet Union in 1991, the Spetsnaz GRU remained intact as part of the Russian GRU until 2010, when it was reassigned to other agencies. In 2013, however, the decision was reversed and Spetsnaz GRU units were reassigned to GRU divisions and placed under GRU authority again.

== Education ==
GRU officers train at a Ministry of Defence military academy at 50 Narodnoe Opolchenie Street, with intelligence agents receiving additional training at the Cherepovets Higher Military School of Radio Electronics. The A.F. Mozhaysky Military-Space Academy has also been used to train GRU officers.

== Activities by country ==
According to the Federation of American Scientists: "Though sometimes compared to the US Defense Intelligence Agency, [the GRU's] activities encompass those performed by nearly all joint US military intelligence agencies as well as other national US organizations. The GRU gathers human intelligence through military attaches and foreign agents. It also maintains significant signals intelligence (SIGINT) and imagery reconnaissance (IMINT) and satellite imagery capabilities." Soviet GRU Space Intelligence Directorate had put more than 130 SIGINT satellites into orbit. GRU and KGB SIGINT network employed about 350,000 specialists.

=== Austria ===
On 9 November 2018 Austrian Chancellor Sebastian Kurz said that a 70-year-old retired army colonel, identified only as "Martin M." was believed to have spied for Russia for years. The officer in question, whose name was not disclosed and who might have been approached under a false flag, was reported to have been engaged in selling official secrets to his GRU handlers from 1992 until September 2018. In July 2019, Austria's Ministry of the Interior confirmed that the colonel's handler was a Moscow-born GRU officer Igor Egorovich Zaytsev, a Russian national, for whom an international arrest warrant had been issued.

=== Bulgaria ===
An investigation by Bellingcat and Capital identified GRU officer Denis Vyacheslavovich Sergeev (using the alias Sergey Vyacheslavovich Fedotov) as a suspect in the 2015 poisoning of Bulgarian arms dealer Emiliyan Gebrev (Емилиян Гебрев) in Sofia, following an attack that mirrored the techniques used in the poisoning of Sergei and Yulia Skripal. That attack has been specifically tied to Unit 29155. Three individuals were charged in absentia by the Bulgarians in January 2020.

In March 2021, six Bulgarian nationals alleged to be members of a GRU spy ring operating in Bulgaria were arrested in Sofia.

=== Canada ===
The GRU received intelligence from Jeffrey Delisle of the Royal Canadian Navy, leading to the expulsion of several Russian Embassy staffers, including the defence attaché to Ottawa.

=== Colombia ===
In December 2020, Migración Colombia confirmed the expulsion of two Russian diplomats accused of espionage. One of the assailants was identified as Aleksandr Nikolayevich Belousov who, according to the National Intelligence Directorate of Colombia, is a GRU officer that had been credited by the Russian Embassy in Bogotá as a secretary. Nikolayevich, along with an SVR officer, had reportedly tried to gather intelligence on the country's electricity infrastructure on behalf of Venezuela's Maduro government.

=== Czech Republic ===
On 17 April 2021, the Czech Republic announced its intelligence agencies had concluded that GRU officers, namely members of Russian military intelligence GRU's unit 29155, were involved in two massive ammunition depot explosions in Vrbetice (part of Vlachovice), near the Czech–Slovak border, in October 2014. The explosions killed two persons and "inflicted immense material damage, seriously endangered and disrupted the lives of many local residents", according to the Czech prime minister.

=== Estonia ===
In 2007, Deniss Metsavas, a Lasnamäe-born member of the Estonian Land Forces, was targeted with a honey trapping operation while visiting Smolensk. He was subsequently blackmailed into providing information to GRU handlers. His father, Pjotr Volin, was also recruited by GRU agents as leverage against Deniss, and would serve as a courier for classified information.

In May 2017, Russian citizen Artem Zinchenko was convicted of spying on Estonia for the GRU. In 2018, Zinchenko was traded back to Russia in exchange for Raivo Susi, an Estonian imprisoned for espionage. In 2022, Zinchenko fled Russia to seek asylum in Estonia, citing personal opposition to the 2022 Russian invasion of Ukraine.

On 5 September 2018, Major Deniss Metsavas and Pjotr Volin were charged with giving classified information to the GRU The two were convicted in February 2019.

=== Finland ===
In September 2018, Finnish police ran a large scale operation against numerous sites owned by Airiston Helmi Oy company that over years accumulated land plots and buildings close to nationally significant key straits, ports, oil refineries and other strategic locations as well as two Finnish Navy vessels. The security operation was run in parallel in multiple locations, involving Finnish National Bureau of Investigation, local police, Tax Administration, Border Guard, and Finnish Defence Forces. During the operation, a no-fly zone was declared over Turku Archipelago where key objects were located. While official cause given for the raid was multi-million euro money laundering and tax fraud, media speculated that the company had been a cover for GRU preparing infrastructure for a surprise attack on Finnish locations in case of a conflict situation.

=== France ===
Viktor Ilyushin, a GRU operative working as an Air Force deputy attaché, was expelled from France in 2014 for attempted espionage of the staff of François Hollande.

In August 2015, a GRU unit posing as Islamic State of Iraq and the Levant supporters called CyberCaliphate took TV5Monde offline for approximately 18 hours.

GRU's APT – Fancy Bear used fake Facebook accounts to pose as associates of Emmanuel Macron's campaign staff, with the goal of interfering with the 2017 French presidential election. Georgy Petrovich Roshka, a member of the GRU's Unit 26165 was involved in the theft of Macron's emails, and subsequent distribution via WikiLeaks.

In December 2019, Le Monde reported that the joint effort by British, Swiss, French and U.S. intelligence agencies had discovered an apparent "rear base" of GRU in southeastern France, which was presumably used by GRU for the clandestine operations carried out throughout Europe. Investigators had identified 15 agents – all of them members of GRU's Unit 29155 – who visited Haute-Savoie in the Auvergne-Rhône-Alpes, region of France from 2014 to 2018, including Alexander Petrov and Ruslan Boshirov, who are believed to be behind the poisoning of the former GRU colonel and British double agent Sergei Skripal in Salisbury in 2018.

=== Georgia ===
During the 2006 Georgian–Russian espionage controversy, four officers working for the GRU Alexander Savva, Dmitry Kazantsev, Aleksey Zavgorodny and Alexander Baranov were arrested by the Counter-Intelligence Department of the Ministry of Internal Affairs of Georgia and were accused of espionage and sabotage. This spy network was managed from Armenia by GRU Colonel Anatoly Sinitsin. A few days later the arrested officers were handed over to Russia through the Organization for Security and Co-operation in Europe (OSCE).

Spetsnaz GRU unit No. 48427, an airborne unit, participated in the Russo-Georgian War.

=== Germany ===
The 2015 Bundestag hack was attributed by German intelligence to the GRU. In 2020, Germany issued an arrest warrant for Dmitry Badin, a GRU officer and Unit 26165/Fancy Bear member also accused of involvement in the 2015–2016 DNC hacks in the United States, alleging he played a leading role in the Bundestag hack.

In 2018, German officials reported a key data network used by the Chancellery, ministries, and Parliament had been breached. German media attributed the attack to a Russian Government-sponsored hacking group, either Snake/Ouroborus or Fancy Bear.

In February 2021, Germany charged German citizen Jens F., a worker whose company maintained Bundestag electrical equipment, with espionage, accusing him of providing the building's floor plans to GRU operatives in the Russian embassy in 2017. The suspect was a former army officer allegedly linked to the Stasi in the 1980s.

In September 2021, the German foreign ministry warned Russia against the continuation of a pre-election cyberattack campaign targeting German legislators, claiming it had "reliable information" linking the Ghostwriter group behind the attacks to the GRU. The prosecutor general later opened an investigation into the affair.

=== Japan ===
In 1980, Yukihisa Miyanaga was arrested for providing military secrets from the Defense Agency to Colonel Yuriy N. Koslov, stationed at the Soviet Embassy. 1st Lt. Eiichi Kashii and Warrant Officer Tsunetoshi Oshima were also arrested for passing secrets to Miyanaga.

In September 2000, Japan expelled Captain Viktor Bogatenkov, a military attaché at the Russian Embassy in Tokyo, on allegations of espionage. Bogatenkov was a GRU agent who received classified information from Shigehiro Hagisaki (萩嵜 繁博), a researcher at the National Institute for Defense Studies.

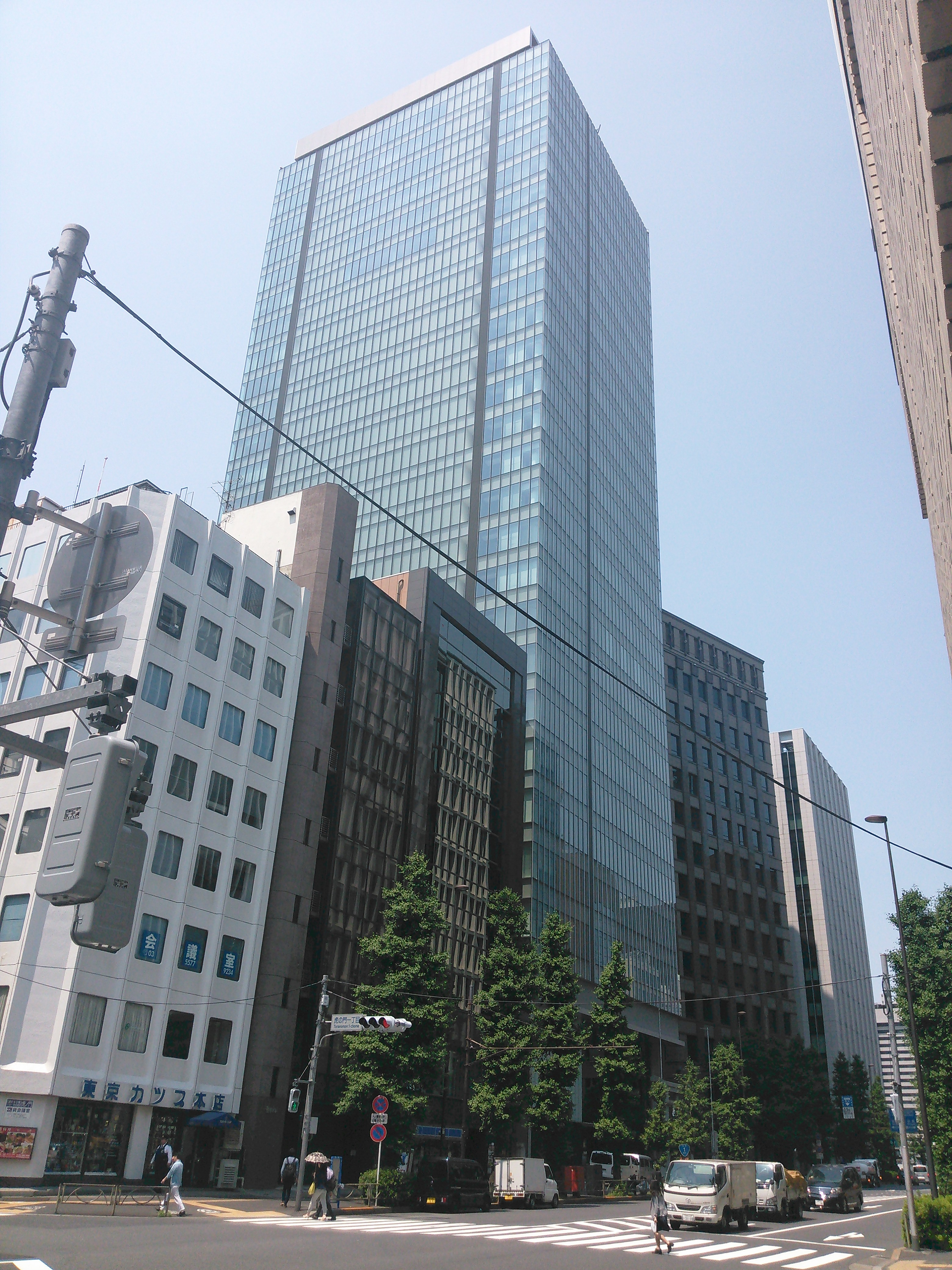
The GRU's Twentieth Directorate operates in an Aeroflot office on the 22nd floor of Toranomon Kotohira Tower

The GRU operates its 20th Directorate in Tokyo, Japan, working out of an Aeroflot office in Minato City. The office is run by GRU officer Maksim Vladimirovich Filchenkov.

=== Latvia ===
In early 2018, an investigation by Russian opposition site Mbk.media alleged then-first secretary of the Russian Embassy in Latvia Roman Tatarka was a GRU operative and former classmate of Anatoly Chepiga.

In October 2018, Latvia's Constitution Protection Bureau accused Russia of conducting a years-long phishing campaign targeting "state institutions, including the foreign and defense sectors."

=== Lithuania ===
In 2012, GRU officer Sergey Moiseyenko recruited Lithuanian Air Force officer Sergej Pusin to conduct espionage on Lithuanian and NATO military operations. Pusin additionally passed personal files on various military officers. Moiseyenko was arrested in 2014 and sentenced to 10.5 years in prison, but was pardoned and returned to Russia by President Nausėda as part of a trilateral prisoner exchange with Norway and Russia in 2019.

=== Mexico ===
In March 2022, General Glen VanHerck of United States Northern Command testified that "the largest portion of the GRU members is in Mexico right now" seeking "opportunities to...influence [and access the] U.S." Mexican President López Obrador downplayed the allegation, emphasizing Mexican sovereignty and stating his country "[did not] get involved in [espionage]."

=== Moldova ===
In June 2017, Moldova expelled five Russian GRU operatives with diplomatic cover from the Russian Embassy in Chișinău, as they were believed to be attempting to recruit fighters from Gagauzia to fight in the ongoing conflict with Ukraine. Russian Deputy Minister of Foreign Affairs Grigory Karasin rejected the allegations.

=== Montenegro ===
The two Russian nationals indicted by Montenegrin prosecution as the organisers of the attempted coup d'état in Montenegro in October 2016 are believed to be GRU officers. One of them, Eduard Vadimovich Shishmakov ("Shirokov") had been officially identified as GRU in October 2014, when Shishmakov, who then held the position of a deputy military attaché at the Russian embassy in Poland, was declared persona non grata by the Polish government.

=== The Netherlands and Switzerland ===
In mid-September 2018 the Swiss press reported that two men allegedly working for the GRU had been arrested in The Hague, the Netherlands in the spring that year, after the Salisbury poisoning incident, for planning to hack the computer systems of the Spiez Laboratory, a Swiss institute analyzing chemical weapon attacks for the Organisation for the Prohibition of Chemical Weapons (OPCW). In early October 2018, the government of the Netherlands announced they had arrested four GRU operatives on 13 April: Aleksei Morenets, Evgenii Serebriakov, Oleg Sotnikov, and Aleksey Minin. The Russians allegedly attempted to launch a major "close access" cyberattack against the headquarters of the OPCW in the Hague and also intended to travel onwards to the Spiez laboratory in Switzerland, which was testing Novichok samples from Salisbury at the time. Investigation conducted by open-source intelligence outlets in the aftermath of the Dutch government's revelations that used Russian road police databases led to identification of further 305 GRU officers whose private cars were registered at GRU headquarters in Moscow. GRU officer Denis Vyacheslavovich Sergeev has also been documented as operating in Geneva and Lausanne.

==== Alleged attempt to infiltrate International Criminal Court ====
In June 2022, the Dutch AIVD stated that GRU intelligence officer Sergey Vladimirovich Cherkasov, under the alias of Viktor Muller Ferreira, was denied entry to the Netherlands after arriving for an internship with the International Criminal Court. The AIVD described Cherkasov as a deep-cover illegal, publishing a document he is alleged to have written in 2010 reminding himself of his cover identity. As Ferreira, Cherkasov is alleged to have attended university in the United States and Republic of Ireland, building a cover identity for years as a Brazilian national with an interest in international affairs. AIVD head Erik Akerboom described the attempted infiltration as a "long-term, multi-year GRU operation that cost a lot of time, energy and money," calling it a "high-level threat."

=== Norway ===
In December 2020, the Norwegian Police Security Service (PST) stated that hackers linked to Fancy Bear and the GRU's 85th Special Services Center (GTsSS) were likely responsible for a breach of the Storting's email system earlier in the year. The Russian Embassy in Norway denied the claims.

In October 2022, the PST arrested and charged Russian citizen Mikhail Valerievich Mikushin with "illegal espionage against state secrets." Mikushin had posed as a Brazilian academic named Jose Assis Giammaria and was, at the time of his arrest, researching Norwegian Arctic policy and hybrid threats at the University of Tromsø. Bellingcat investigator Christo Grozev identified Mikushin as a GRU colonel while the Russian embassy in Norway denied any knowledge of Mikushin, calling his arrest a part of "spy mania."

=== Poland ===
In June 2014, Poland expelled Russian deputy military attaché Eduard Shishmakov (alias Eduard Shirokov) and three other Russian citizens accused of spying over a 2014 wiretap scandal involving the publication of wiretapped conversations between senior Polish officials. Shishmakov, an accused GRU operative, later became a key suspect in the 2016 Montenegrin coup allegations.

In October 2014, Poland arrested two alleged GRU spies. Polish Lt. Col. Zbigniew J. worked for the GRU for "several years" feeding information on unit morale and troop movements while lawyer-lobbyist Stanisław Szypowski influenced governmental circles and sought a job in the Economy Ministry while providing information on the energy sector. Both met with GRU operatives under official cover in Warsaw and were monitored by Polish counterintelligence.

In July 2019, a Warsaw court sentenced former Economy Ministry employee Marek W. to three years in prison for passing classified information on the energy sector to the GRU from 2015 to 2016.

In May 2020, Polish journalists, supported by former intelligence officials, accused the GRU of conducting a 700-email bomb threat campaign against Polish schools as part of a hybrid warfare strategy. Polish and Russian intelligence services did not comment on the accusations.

In March 2022, the Polish Internal Security Agency (ABW) arrested reporter Pablo Gonzalez, whom they identified as "an agent of the [GRU]," as he planned to cross the Polish-Ukrainian border. Gonzalez, a Spanish citizen of Russian origin, was found with two passports of different names and detained on suspicion of espionage. The ABW accused Gonzalez of "[carrying] out activities for Russia using his journalistic status" and traveling to worldwide zones of conflict and political instability.

In January 2023, Warsaw authorities arrested a Russian and a Belarusian national. The SKW, Poland's military counterintelligence agency, accused the pair of spying on Polish military facilities for the GRU since 2017.

=== Qatar ===
On 13 February 2004, in Doha, two Russian men assassinated Zelimkhan Yandarbiyev, an exiled leader of Chechen rebels and former President of the Chechen Republic of Ichkeria, in a car-bombing. Yandarbiyev's son was also killed. Anatoly V. Belashkov and Vasily A. Bogachyov, thought to be GRU members, were found guilty of the murder by a Qatari criminal court, which said the men had acted under direct orders from the Russian leadership. A third suspected GRU agent, posted as first secretary of the Russian Embassy in Qatar, was arrested but released to his diplomatic immunity. Those sentenced were sent to Russia to serve their sentences but disappeared shortly after.

=== Russia ===
Dmitry Kozak and Vladislav Surkov, members of the Vladimir Putin administration, reportedly served in the GRU. Two Chechens, Said-Magomed Kakiev and former warlord Sulim Yamadayev were commanders of Special Battalions Vostok and Zapad ("East" and "West") that were controlled by the GRU. The battalions each included close to a thousand fighters until their disbandment in 2008.

Approximately 300 commandos, intelligence officers and other GRU personnel died during the fighting in Chechnya.

GRU detachments from Chechnya were transferred to Lebanon independently of the United Nations Interim Force in Lebanon after the 2006 Lebanon War.

GRU officers have also been accused of creating criminal death squads.

=== Slovakia ===
In early 2022, Slovakia arrested four Slovak nationals described as a "Russian spying network [seeking] information about NATO and Ukraine." Two were charged with spying and bribery, with Slovak authorities alleging undercover GRU officers at the Russian Embassy paid tens of thousands of euros for the "highly sensitive" information about Slovakia, the Slovak military, and NATO. The men charged were a Slovak military academy rector and disinformation blogger; the other two were released without charge.

=== Slovenia ===
In January 2023, the Slovenian Intelligence and Security Agency arrested and charged two individuals in Ljubljana with espionage on behalf of the GRU and using false documents. Both were reportedly operating under assumed identities with ties to Argentina. Media variously described those charged as either a husband and wife or two men.

=== Spain ===
According to reporting by Bellingcat, El País and the Civica Media Foundation, the Audiencia Nacional is investigating a GRU group known as Unit 29155 and its operations in Spain. GRU members Denis Sergeev, Alexey Kalinin and Mikhail Opryshko are reported to have been operating in Barcelona around the time of the 2017 Catalan independence referendum.

=== Sweden ===
In late 2021, Swedish authorities arrested brothers Peyman and Payam Kia for aggravated espionage on behalf of the GRU. Peyman had worked with the Swedish Security Service and Swedish Armed Forces; both brothers were jailed in January 2023.

In late 2022, elite police arrested Russian-born Swedish citizen Sergey Skvortsov, accusing him of nearly 10 years of "gross illegal intelligence activities against Sweden and against a foreign power" (later identified as the United States) on behalf of the GRU. Skvortsov reportedly worked to illegally transfer Western technology to Russia.

=== Syria ===
The Sixth Directorate was responsible for maintaining the Center S covert listening post in Syria prior to its loss to the Free Syrian Army in 2014. The Sixth Directorate also operates a signals intelligence listening post at Hmeimim Air Base near Latakia.

In 2015 GRU special forces soldiers have reportedly appeared in Aleppo and Homs. GRU officials have also visited Qamishli, near the border with Turkey.

=== Turkey ===
In 2018 the Turkish government published CCTV videos from assassination of a Chechen commander Abdulvahid Edelgiriev, who was killed in 2015 in Istanbul, claiming the perpetrator was the same person as Anatoliy Chepiga ("Ruslan Boshirov") from Skripal assassination in UK.

=== Ukraine ===
The Spetsnaz GRU were involved in the annexation of Crimea by the Russian Federation and in the war in Donbas. During the November 2018, Kerch Strait incident, the GRU's Unit 54777 sent text messages to Ukrainian men in the border region calling on them to report for military service.

News media and private cybersecurity firms allege that the GRU hacked the computer networks of Ukrainian energy company Burisma, a key player in the 2020 Biden–Ukraine conspiracy theory.

Spetsnaz GRU are involved in the 2022 Russian invasion of Ukraine. Their first reported casualty was Captain Alexey Gluschak, killed in action in Mariupol on 8 March.

=== United Kingdom ===
In September 2018 the Crown Prosecution Service formally named two Russian nationals, Alexander Petrov and Ruslan Boshirov (the names used by the men when entering the UK), as suspected perpetrators of the assassination attempt of the former GRU officer Sergei Skripal and his daughter in March 2018. As part of the charge announcement Scotland Yard released a detailed track of the individuals' 48 hours in the UK. This covered their arrival in the UK at Gatwick Airport, trip to Salisbury the day before the attack, trip to Salisbury on the day of the attack and return to Moscow via Heathrow Airport. The two men stayed both nights in the City Stay Hotel on Bow Road, East London and Novichok agent was found in their room after police sealed it off on 4 May 2018. British Prime Minister Theresa May told the Commons the same day that the suspects were part of the G.U. intelligence service (formerly known as GRU) and the assassination attempt was not a rogue operation and was "almost certainly" approved at a senior level of the Russian state.

As a side effect of the Skripal poisoning investigation, Russian and Western media reported conclusions made by open-source intelligence outlets that claimed that GRU operatives were issued Russian foreign travel passports with certain characteristics that would allow their tentative identification. Through further research, in the autumn of 2018, "Boshirov" was publicly exposed as Anatoliy Chepiga, a decorated GRU officer, and "Petrov" as Alexander Mishkin.

=== United States ===
GRU officer Stanislav Lunev, who defected to the U.S. in 1992 while he was posted in Washington under the cover of a TASS news agency correspondent, in the 1990s publicized his claims that small nuclear weapons that could be fit into a knapsack or a briefcase or suitcase had been secretly pre-positioned in the U.S. and other countries around the world to be used for sabotage by Russia's agents in the event of war. U.S. Congressman Curt Weldon pursued these claims publicly while admitting that they had been found largely spurious by the FBI. Searches of the areas identified by Lunev – who admitted he had never planted any weapons in the US – have been conducted, "but law-enforcement officials have never found such weapons caches, with or without portable nuclear weapons".

==== Electoral interference ====
United States Deputy Attorney General Rod Rosenstein announcing in 2018 a grand jury indictment of 12 Russian intelligence officers for hacking offenses related to the 2016 U.S. presidential election

On 29 December 2016 the White House sanctioned the nine entities and individuals, including the GRU as well as the FSB, for their alleged activities to disrupt and spread disinformation during the 2016 US presidential election. In addition, the United States State Department also declared 35 Russian diplomats and officials persona non grata and denied Russian government officials access to two Russian-owned installations in Maryland and New York. On 13 July 2018, an indictment to several GRU Staffers was issued. GRU Unit 26165 and Unit 74455 are alleged to be behind the DCLeaks website, and were indicted for obtaining access and distributing information from data about 500,000 voters from a state election board website as well as the email accounts of John Podesta, Hillary Clinton, and volunteers and employees of the United States Presidential Campaign of Hillary Clinton, the Democratic Congressional Campaign Committee, and the Democratic National Committee (DNC). According to information leaked by Reality Winner, the GRU attempted to hack the voting machine manufacturer VR Systems, as well as local election officials.

In July 2018 Deputy Attorney General Rod Rosenstein released an indictment returned by a grand jury charging twelve GRU officers with conspiring to interfere in the 2016 elections.

According to Microsoft VP Tom Burt, a GRU-run group dubbed Strontium (alternatively known as APT28, Sofacy, and Pawn Storm, and Fancy Bear) has been engaged in spear phishing attacks against at least three campaigns in the 2018 midterm elections.

On 19 November 2021, the Coordinating Council of Russian Compatriots in the United States (CCORC) or (KCOPC) closed and on 9 March 2022 Elena Branson was accused of working as a foreign agent by the FBI.

=== Yemen ===
In August 2024, Middle East Eye, citing a US official, reported that personnel of GRU were stationed in Houthi-controlled parts of Yemen to assist the militia's attacks on merchant ships during the Gaza war.

== Directors ==
The Head of the Russian Military Intelligence is a military officer. He is the primary military intelligence adviser to the Russian Minister of Defense and to the Chief of the Russian General Staff and to a certain extent also answers to the President of Russia if ordered so.

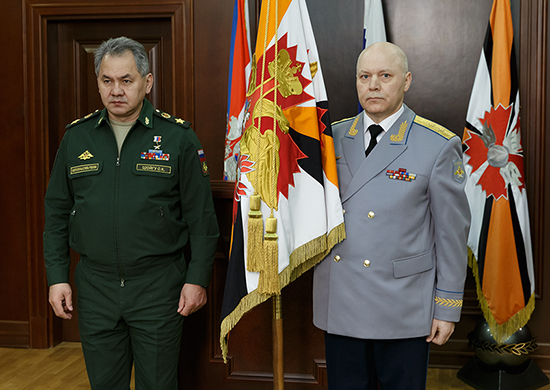
6th GRU chief Igor Korobov (right) and Defence Minister Sergey Shoigu in February 2016

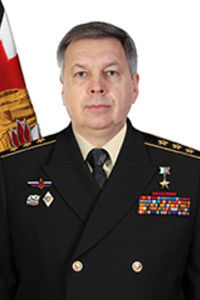
The current and 7th GRU chief Igor Kostyukov

No.	Head	Term	Branch	Presidents served under
1	Yevgeny Timokhin	November 1991 – August 1992	Russian Ground Forces	Boris Yeltsin
2	Fyodor Ladygin	August 1992 – May 1997	Russian Ground Forces	Boris Yeltsin
3	Valentin Korabelnikov	May 1997 – 24 April 2009	Russian Ground Forces	Boris Yeltsin; Vladimir Putin; Dmitry Medvedev
4	Aleksandr Shlyakhturov	24 April 2009 – 25 December 2011	Russian Ground Forces	Dmitry Medvedev
5	Igor Sergun	26 December 2011 – 3 January 2016	Russian Ground Forces	Dmitry Medvedev; Vladimir Putin
6	Igor Korobov	2 February 2016 – 21 November 2018	Russian Air Force	Vladimir Putin
7	Igor Kostyukov	22 November 2018 – present	Russian Navy	Vladimir Putin

== Gallery ==
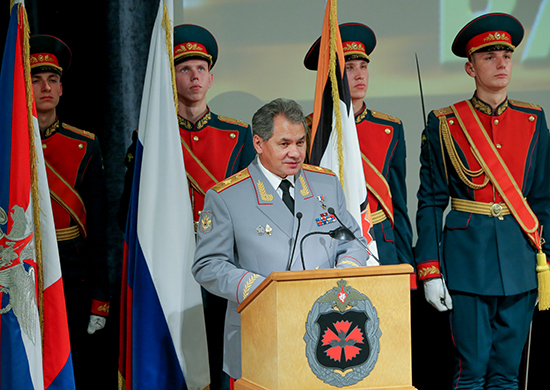
Defence Minister Sergey Shoigu delivering a speech on Military Intelligence Day

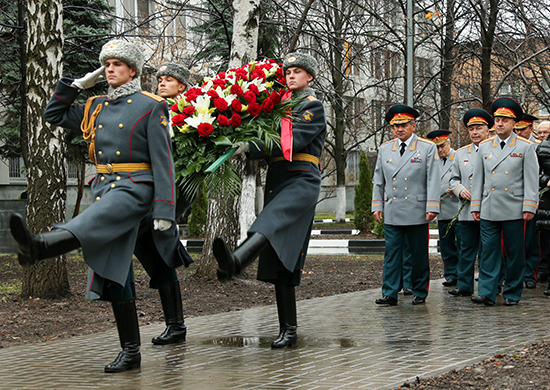
Wreath laying ceremony for past GRU agents

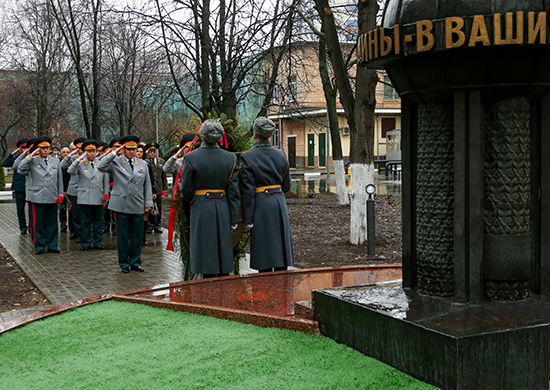
Russian military leaders saluting a monument commemorating the GRU

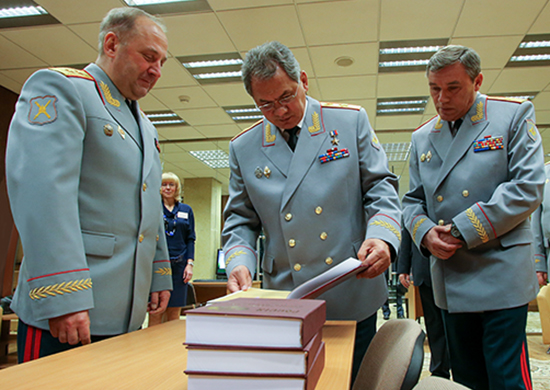
5th GRU chief Igor Sergun with Defence Minister Sergey Shoigu and Chief of the General Staff Valery Gerasimov

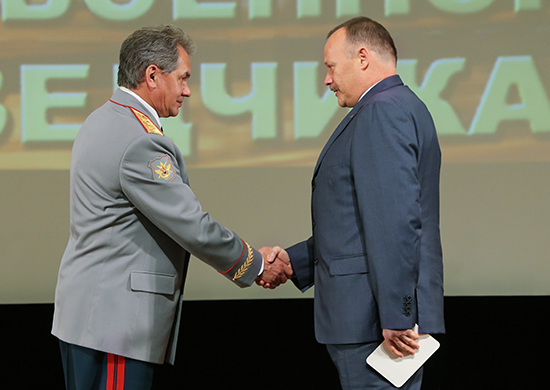
Defence Minister Sergey Shoigu congratulates a GRU employee

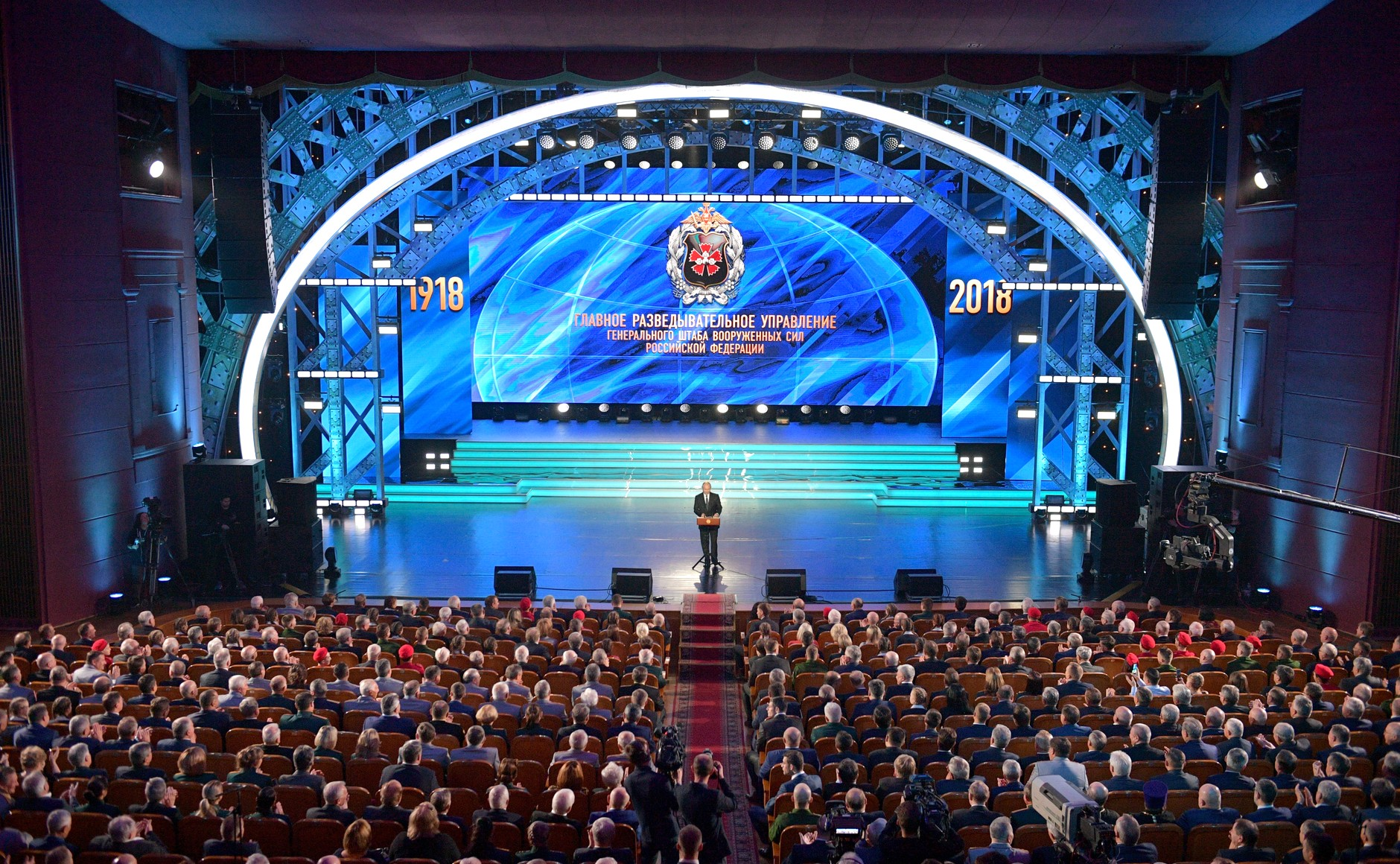
President Vladimir Putin addresses the GRU on its 100th anniversary

Logo used by the Special Forces of the Main Directorate of the General Staff of the Russian Armed Forces

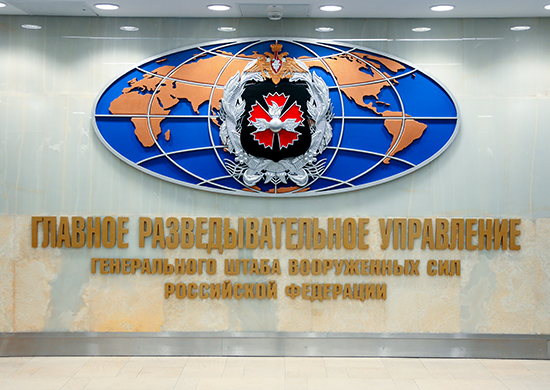
Emblem in the Main Intelligence Directorate of the General Staff of the Armed Forces

Great emblem of the 16th Guards Special Purpose Brigade

== See also ==
- Active measures
- Farewell Dossier
- Intelligence Directorate of the Main Staff of the Russian Navy
- Leopold Trepper, an organizer of the Soviet spy ring Rote Kapelle (Red Orchestra) prior to World War II
- Suitcase nuclear device
- Defense Intelligence Agency
- Pavel Sudoplatov
- SMERSH
- Vatutinki
- Viktor Suvorov
- Vulkan files leak
