= Aleksandr Shlyakhturov =

Russian politician (born 1947)

Colonel General Aleksandr Shlyakhturov
- Александр Шляхтуров

Director of Russian Military Intelligence
- In office 24 April 2009 – 25 December 2011
- Preceded by: Valentin Korabelnikov
- Succeeded by: Igor Sergun

Personal details
- Born: 14 February 1947 (age 79)

Military service
- Allegiance: Russia
- Branch/service: Armed Forces of the Russian Federation
- Rank: Colonel General
- Battles/wars: Cold War; First Chechen War; Second Chechen War

Colonel General Aleksandr Vasilievich Shlyakhturov (Russian: Александр Васильевич Шляхтуров, born 14 February 1947) is a Russian military officer.

Shlyakhturov was appointed head of the Main Intelligence Directorate (GRU) of the Russian General Staff, Russia's largest intelligence agency, on 24 April 2009. Prior to this, Shlyakhturov had served as first deputy to the previous head of the organisation, Gen. Valentin Korabelnikov. Korabelnikov had apparently tendered his resignation earlier in year due to disagreements over reforms of the organisation. Shlyakhturov resigned as head by end of 2011 due to age limits.

He was replaced by Igor Sergun in December 2011.

Political offices
Preceded by Valentin Korabelnikov	GRU Chief; 24 April 2009 – 25 December 2011	Succeeded by Igor Sergun
