= Igor Korobov =

Russian intelligence agent (1956–2018)

Colonel General Igor Korobov
- Игорь Коробов
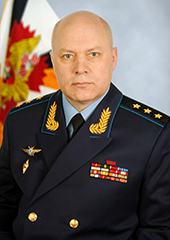
- Official portrait, 2017

Director of Russian Military Intelligence
- In office 2 February 2016 – 21 November 2018
- Defence Minister: Sergei Shoigu
- Preceded by: Igor Sergun
- Succeeded by: Igor Kostyukov

Personal details
- Born: Igor Valentinovich Korobov; 3 August 1956 Vyazma, Russian SFSR, Soviet Union
- Died: 21 November 2018 (aged 62) Moscow, Russia

Military service
- Allegiance: Soviet Union; Russia
- Branch: Soviet Air Force; Russian Air Force
- Service years: 1973–2018
- Rank: Colonel General
- Conflicts: Syrian civil war; Russian intervention

Colonel General Igor Valentinovich Korobov (Russian: И́горь Валенти́нович Ко́робов; 3 August 1956 – 21 November 2018) was the Chief of the Main Directorate of the General Staff of the Armed Forces of the Russian Federation, Russia's military intelligence agency previously known as the GRU.

== Early life ==
Igor Korobov was born in Vyazma, a town in Russia's Smolensk Oblast, on 3 August 1956. In 1977, Korobov graduated with honors from the Stavropol Higher Military Aviation School for Pilots and Navigators, North Caucasus Military District, as an officer in the Soviet Air Forces.

== Career and death ==
Korobov served as head of the Strategic Intelligence Directorate (Upravlenie strategicheskoi razvedky). He was appointed by president Vladimir Putin to head the military intelligence directorate (GU) following the sudden death of Igor Sergun in January 2016.

On 29 December 2016, Korobov was one of the individuals sanctioned by the United States Department of the Treasury for "malicious cyber-enabled activities" threatening the national security of the United States. In May 2017, by a "closed" Decree of the Russian President, Colonel-General Korobov was awarded the Hero of the Russian Federation for courage and heroism displayed in the performance of military duty. Nevertheless, he officially visited the U.S., along with other Russia's top security chiefs, at the end of January 2018.

Korobov died on 21 November 2018, "after a long and serious illness", according to sources in the Russian defence ministry cited by official news agencies. Korobov's death followed a few months after the badly bungled poisoning of Sergei and Yulia Skripal, widely attributed in the West to Korobov's GRU. GRU defector Viktor Suvorov said that while he had no knowledge, "My spy instinct tells me that Korobov was murdered. Everyone sitting inside GRU would understand this, 125%." According to Suvorov, Korobov would have been killed to eliminate a witness who might easily defect.

Political offices
Preceded by Igor Sergun	GRU Chief; 2 February 2016 – 21 November 2018	Succeeded by Igor Kostyukov
