= Sergey Perets =

Russian police officer (1969–2002)

Sergey Vladimirovich Perets
- Born: 28 September 1969; Kostroma, Kostroma Oblast, Russian SFSR, Soviet Union
- Died: 16 August 2002 (aged 32); Shalazhi, Chechen Republic, Russia
- Burial place: Cherepovets
- Military career
- Allegiance: Russia
- Branch: Internal Troops (MVD)
- Service years: 1991–2002
- Rank: Captain
- Unit: 47th Regiment of Internal Troops
- Conflicts: Second Chechen War
- Awards: Hero of Russia; Order of Courage; Order of Merit for the Fatherland, 2nd class with swords Medal "For Valour In Service"

Sergey Vladimirovich Perets (Russian: Серге́й Влади́мирович Пе́рец; 28 September 1969 — 16 August 2002) was a Russian police officer who was killed during the Second Chechen War in 2002 and was posthumously awarded the title of Hero of the Russian Federation.

== Early life ==
Perets was born in Kostroma in 1969. In December 1991, Perets joined the Russian Ground Forces, followed by working in the transport arm of the Ministry of Internal Affairs (MVD) before being transferred to Cherepovets.

== As a police officer ==
He was assigned to the militsiya in Cherepovets, the MVD's police arm due to his military experience. He worked as a traffic policeman (the GAI agency) for four years, until 1998 when he was assigned as the commander of a motorised platoon of militia near Vologda.

== Chechnya ==
From 1998 until 2002, he conducted seven tours of duty in Chechnya as a militiaman in the first and second wars there. His final tour of duty commenced on July 25, 2002 in the early stages of the Second Chechen War. He was noted as the most experienced captain in the motorised police units.

== Fatal incident ==
On August 16, 2002, Perets' unit received intelligence that a unit of riot police from Omsk were under attack in the village of Shalazhi. Perets's unit, composing of three armoured personnel carriers headed there, and upon arriving in the village they opened fire upon militants in the village.

However, the degree of returning fire forced the convoy to stop and fight. During the battle, Perets' APC was cut off from the others and he and his men fought for three hours during which Perets received a wound from shrapnel from a hand grenade but carried on regardless. He dragged one of his men who was injured into cover.

Thanks to Perets' command, the rebels failed to inflict serious damage on the convoy. While running from cover to the APC, he was shot in the head by a sniper and killed instantly. Several minutes after Perets' death, the other APCs rejoined them and the militants scattered, with five killed and seven captured. Two MVD troops were injured in the battle, amongst them the soldier whom Perets dragged to safety.

He was buried in Cherepovets.

== Awards ==
- Hero of the Russian Federation (8 November 2003, posthumously) - for "courage and heroism in the line of duty in the North Caucasus region."
- Order of Courage
- Medal of the Order of Merit for the Fatherland, 2nd class with swords
- Medal For Courage
- Medal for Distinguished Service in Defending Public Order
- Medal "For courage in service" (MIA)

== See also ==
- List of Heroes of the Russian Federation
