= Panik, Armenia =

Village in Shirak, Armenia

Panik Փանիկ
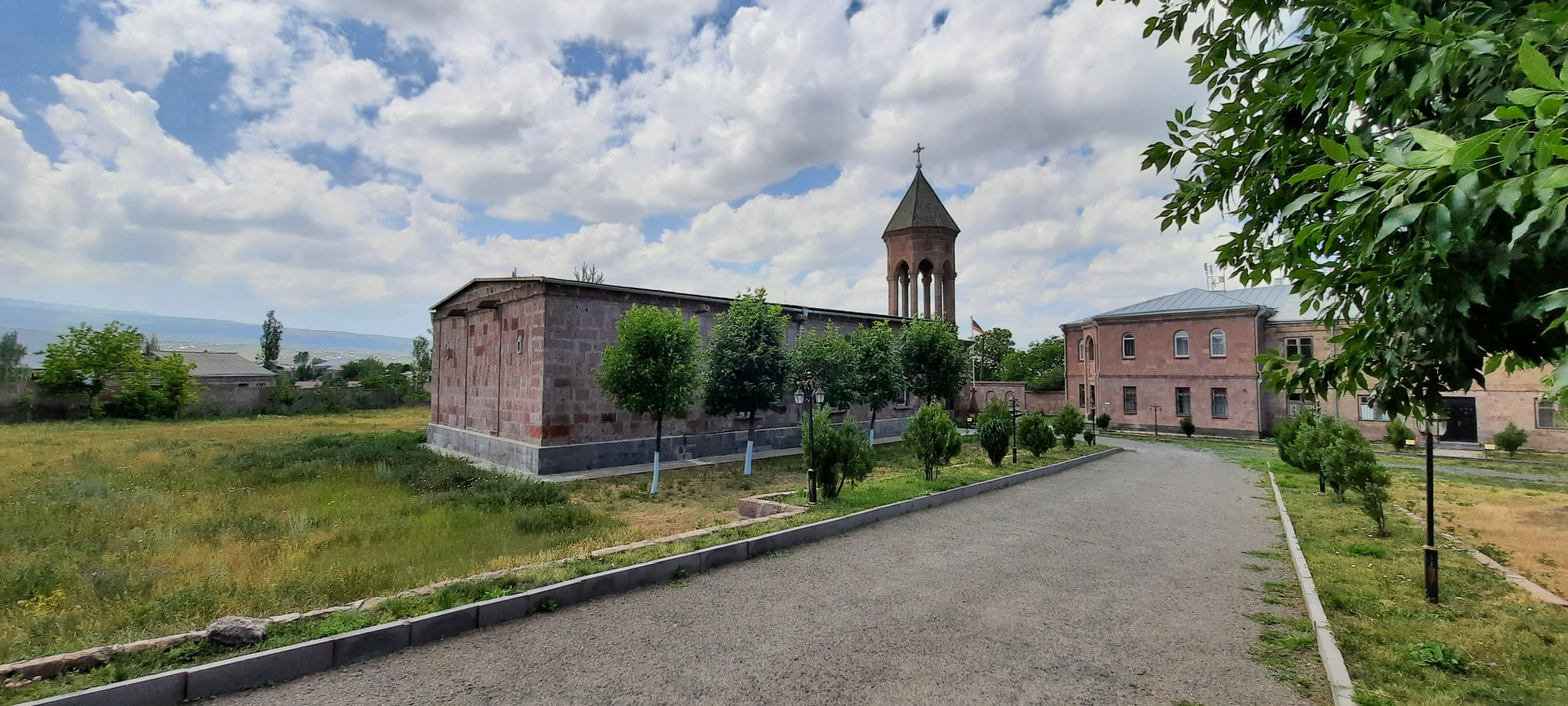

- Location within Armenia Location within Shirak
- Coordinates: 40°39′23″N 43°56′11″E
- Country: Armenia
- Province: Shirak
- Municipality: Artik

Population (2011)
  - Total: 3,157
- Time zone: UTC+4
  - Summer (DST): UTC+5

Panik (Armenian: Փանիկ) is a village in the Artik Municipality of the Shirak Province of Armenia.

The village has an Armenian Catholic majority.

== Demographics ==
Historical population
Year	Pop.	±% p.a.
1831	176	—
1897	1,235	+3.00%
1926	1,685	+1.08%
1939	1,707	+0.10%
1959	1,838	+0.37%
1970	2,292	+2.03%
1979	2,377	+0.41%
1989	3,304	+3.35%
2001	2,831	−1.28%
2011	3,157	+1.10%

== Notable people ==
- Knarik Vardanyan (1914–1996) Armenian Soviet painter, and printmaker. She was awarded the title, People's Artist of the USSR (1967).

== Bibliography ==
- Panik, Armenia at GEOnet Names Server
- World Gazeteer: Armenia – World-Gazetteer.com
- Report of the results of the 2001 Armenian Census, Statistical Committee of Armenia
