= Gera Chausheva =

Bulgarian communist

Gera Peeva Chausheva
- Born: July 18, 1924; Kamenitsa, Bulgaria
- Died: June 10, 1989 (aged 64); Sofia, Bulgaria
- Occupation: Communist
- Known for: First Bulgarian woman to be awarded the Order of Courage

Gera Peeva Chausheva (1924–1989) was a Bulgarian communist resistance member during the Second World War in Bulgaria.

== Life ==
Gera Chausheva was born on 18 July 1924 to the father Peyo Peev and mother Katerina Peeva in Kamenitsa Village, Bulgaria. Her father actively participated in the Balkan Wars. Gera Chausheva had four siblings.

=== Education ===
Gera graduated from elementary school in Kametnitsa village and signed up for high school in Pazardzhik, Bulgaria.

After the war, she continued her high school education in Moscow, Russia.

=== Partisan movement ===
Gera Peeva joined the partisan movement of Anton Ivanov in 1943. She actively participated in all military actions and movements of troops. On the 26 March 1944, her sister Vela, who was also involved in the partisan movement, was shot and killed.

== World War II ==
Gera joined the Russian military forces against Germany in 1944 during World War II. She later got promoted to the rank of lieutenant officer and became a platoon commander.

On 4 November 1944, in honor of her demonstration of special valor during a battle with the enemy near the village of Chertsey, Gera Peeva became the first woman to be awarded the Russian Order of Courage.
