= Intelligence Directorate of the Main Staff of the Russian Navy =

Intelligence service

- Razvedyvatel'noje Upravlenije; РУ ГШ ВМФ РФ; Разведывательное Управление Главного штаба ВМФ России
- Russian Navy Emblem

Agency overview
- Formed: February 16, 1938; 88 years ago
- Preceding agency: Maritime service of the Red Army Registration Service
- Jurisdiction: Russian Federation
- Employees: Classified
- Annual budget: Classified
- Agency executive: Oleg Apishev, Commander
- Parent agency: Russian Navy
- Child agency: Russian commando frogmen

Intelligence Directorate of the Main Staff of the Russian Navy (Russian: Разве́дывательное управле́ние Главного штаба ВМФ РФ) is one of the intelligence services in Russia, created as the Intelligence department of the Soviet navy in 1938, although it has earlier roots.

On February 16, 1938, by order of the People's Commissar of the Navy of the USSR, all matters of naval intelligence were transferred to the newly created Intelligence Department of the People's Commissariat of the Navy.

== History ==
The history of the creation of the Russian Navy intelligence dates back to the end of the 19th century, but was part of Military Intelligence. The Navy's independent intelligence service was established on February 16, 1938, as the NKVMF intelligence department.

== Commanders ==
The head of the Russian Navy's Intelligence Directorate, a Vice Admiral, also serves as Deputy Director of the Main Intelligence Directorate (GRU) of the Russian Armed Forces General Staff. The director has a full-time deputy of rear admiral rank and manages all the forces and means of operational and agents intelligence of the fleet.

Name	Start term	end term
USSR Naval Intelligence
Aleksandr Yakimichev	January 1938	March 1938
Nikolay Zuikov	March 1938	September 1941
Mikhail Vorontsov	September 1941	April 1945
Aleksandr Rumyantsev	April 1945	August 1946
Nikolay Tishkin	1946	1950
Leonid Bekrenev	April 1950	May 1953
Boris Bobkov	May 1953	May 1965
Yuriy Ivanov	1965	1978
Ivan Khurs	1978	1987
Yuriy Kviatkovskiy	1987	1992
Russian Naval Intelligence
Vladlen Smirnov	1992	1995
Vladimir Fedorov	1995	2003
Dmitriy Dmitriev	2003	2009
Aleksandr Shtukaturov	2009	2018
Oleg Apishev	2018	-

== See also ==
- Main Directorate of the Main staff (Russian Armed Forces Intelligence)
- Office of Naval Intelligence
- Naval Intelligence Division (United Kingdom)
