= Andrei Mironov =

Andrei Mironov or Andrey Mironov may refer to:

- Andrei Mironov (activist) (1954–2014), political prisoner and activist
- Andrei Mironov (actor) (1941–1987), theatre and film actor
- Andrei Mironov (footballer, born 1987), Russian football player
- Andrei Mironov (footballer, born 1997), Russian football player
- Andrei Mironov (ice hockey) (born 1994), ice hockey defenceman
- Andrei Mironov (painter) (born 1975), artist
