= Knarik Vardanyan =

Armenian Soviet painter (1914–1996)

- Քնարիկ Վարդանյան
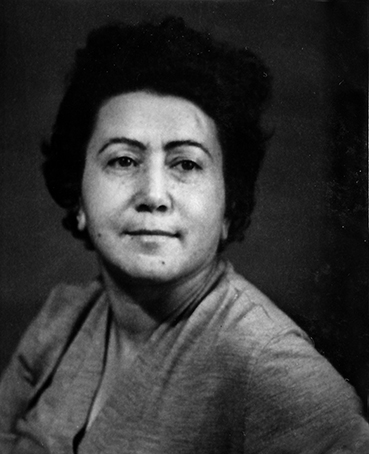
- Born: Knarik Grigori Vardanyan; 24 November 1914; Panik (formerly Kaftarlı village), Caucasus Viceroyalty, Russian Empire
- Died: 25 December 1996 (aged 82); Yerevan, Armenia
- Education: House of Armenian Culture
- Alma mater: Leninakan Construction Technical College, Panos Terlemezyan State College of Fine Arts, Yerevan State Institute of Fine Arts and Theater
- Known for: Painting, printmaking
- Spouse: Davit Poghossian
- Awards: Honored Artist of the Armenian SSR (1967)

Knarik Grigori Vardanyan (Armenian: Քնարիկ Վարդանյան; 1914–1996) was an Armenian Soviet artist, best known as a painter, and printmaker. She was awarded the title, Honored Artist of the Armenian SSR (1967).

== Biography ==
Knarik Vardanyan was born on 24 November 1914 in Kaftarli village (now known as Panik), Alexandropol uezd, Caucasus Viceroyalty, Russian Empire.

She graduated in 1933 from Leninakan Construction Technical College (now known as Gyumri State Technical College). The following year from 1933 to 1934, Vardanyan worked in Alexander Tamanian's architectural studio as an assistant. In 1941, she graduated from Panos Terlemezyan State College of Fine Arts; followed by a graduation in 1950 from Yerevan State Institute of Fine Arts and Theater; and study from 1950 to 1952 in the painting department at the House of Armenian Culture in Moscow, under B. V. Johanson.

From 1942 to 1944, she worked as the main artist in the Hovhannes Tumanyan Puppet Theatre of Yerevan, and helped create a number of performances. Starting in 1950, Vardanyan was a member of the Communist Party of the Soviet Union (CPSU). She was married to opera singer Davit Poghossian (1911–2004).

Vardanyan painted on the theme of the everyday life of a working man. In the 1960s and 1970s, she started changing her line work and color palette to reflect on nature. She had solo exhibitions in Yerevan (1965, 1978, 1981), Leninakan (1981), Kirovakan (1981), Yeghegnadzor (1982), and Tbilisi (1982). Many of her artworks can be found in museum collections, including an extensive collection at the National Gallery of Armenia.

She died on 25 December 1996 in Yerevan, Armenia.

== See also ==
- List of Armenian women artists
