= Shigehiro Hagisaki =

- 萩嵜 繁博
- Born: 1962 (age 63–64); Kyoto
- Military career
- Allegiance: Japan
- Branch: Maritime Self-Defense Force
- Rank: Lieutenant Commander

Shigehiro Hagisaki (萩嵜 繁博, Hagisaki Shigehiro) (born 1962 in Kyoto) is a former Lieutenant Commander in the Maritime Self-Defense Force of Japan. He was found guilty of selling military secrets to Russia.

Hagisaki worked at the National Institute for Defense Studies. He was arrested on September 8, 2000 while meeting a Russian military attaché, Captain Viktor Bogatenkov, at a Tokyo restaurant. Hagisaki then confessed to passing secret information to Bogatenkov. Bogatenkov himself cited diplomatic immunity, and left the country shortly afterwards. According to Japanese officials, Hagisaki met with Bogatenkov or other Russian agents on at least ten occasions, and gave them information on defence plans, communications, and United States military activities in Japan. The arrest came shortly after a visit to Japan by Russian leader Vladimir Putin, during which politicians of both Russia and Japan had talked of warm relations between the two countries — as such, the revelations caused considerable public outcry.

When asked why he had assisted Bogatenkov, Hagisaki said that Bogatenkov had implied that he could assist with treatment for Hagisaki's ill son. Hagisaki also said that Bogatenkov had promised assistance obtaining historic information on the Soviet Navy which Hagisaki needed for a research project, and had been understanding of Hagisaki's strong religious views.

Hagisaki entered a guilty plea on November 27, 2000. The following year, he was given a 10-month prison sentence. He had already received a dishonorable discharge in October.
