= Oleg Kozlov =

Russian military officer (born 1963)

Oleg Aleksandrovich Kozlov
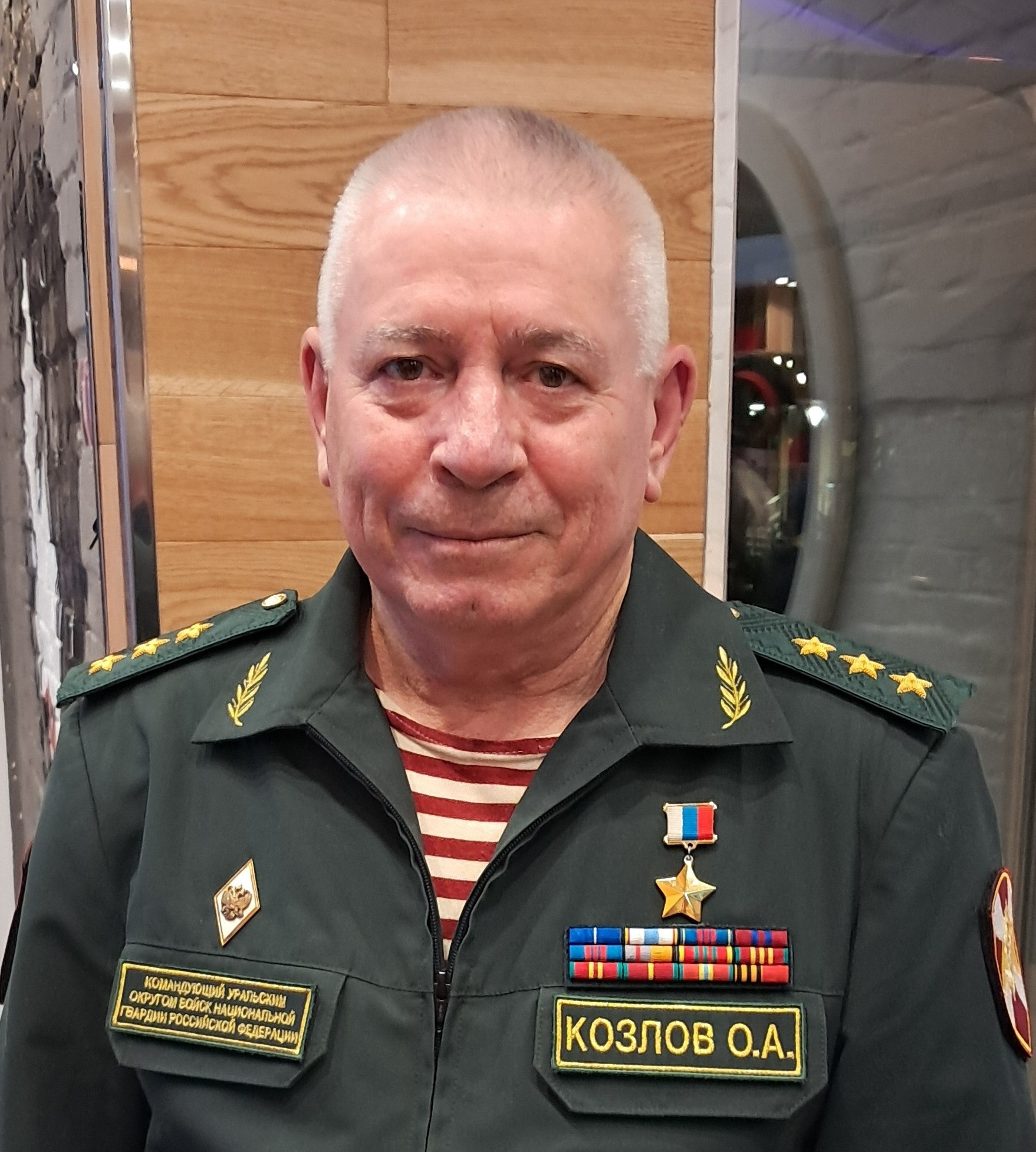
- Kozlov in 2024
- Born: 20 April 1963 (age 63); Arzgir, Arzgirsky District, Stavropol Krai, Soviet Union
- Military career
- Allegiance: Soviet Union; Russia
- Branch: Red Army; Russian Army
- Service years: 1980–
- Rank: Major General
- Unit: 58th Combined Arms Army
- Commands: 693rd Motorized Infantry Regiment (1993–1996)
- Conflicts: Soviet–Afghan War; First Chechen War
- Awards: Hero of the Russian Federation; Order of Courage

Major General Oleg Aleksandrovich Kozlov (Russian: Олег Александрович Козлов; born 20 April 1963) is a Russian military officer and recipient of the Hero of the Russian Federation, which he received in 1996 for "courage and heroism in the performance of special assignments" during the First Chechen War during which he commanded a regiment of motorized infantry.

== Early life ==
Kozlov was born in the village of Arzgir in Stavropol Krai in what was at that time the Soviet Union in 1963 to a family of workers. He graduated from School №1 in Arzgir in 1980, following which he entered the military academy.

== Military service ==
After graduating from the Tashkent Higher Tank Command School in 1984 he was assigned to the reserve of the 40th Army of the Turkestan Military District, serving during the Soviet–Afghan War as a motorized infantry commander. Following the conclusion of the war, he served in Hungary, Turkmenistan and Belarus. In 1993, now under the banner of the Russian Federation, he graduated from the Military Academy of Armored Forces following which he served in the First Chechen War in the Republic of North Ossetia, partaking in two tours of duty; the first from 11 December 1994 to 27 April 1995, the second from 19 February to 8 October 1996.

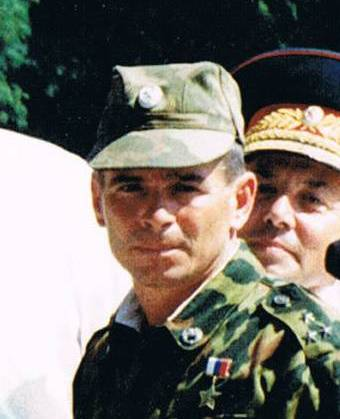
Kozlov in 1998

By the end of his tours in Chechnya he had attained the rank of colonel and was awarded the title of Hero of the Russian Federation on 19 October 1996 by then-President Boris Yeltsin. He continued service in the military—serving as an assistant governor of Stavropol Krai, followed by his graduation from the Russian General Staff Academy and promotion to flag officer status. At the current time, he serves as the deputy commander of the Eastern Regional Command of the Russian internal troops, the MVD.
