= Valentin Korabelnikov =

Russian Army General

General of the Army Valentin Korabelnikov
- Валентин Корабельников

Director of the Main Intelligence Directorate of the General Staff
- In office May 1997 – 24 April 2009
- Preceded by: Fyodor Ladygin
- Succeeded by: Alexander Shlyakhturov

Personal details
- Born: January 4, 1946 (age 80) Tambov Oblast, Russian SFSR, Soviet Union
- Awards: Hero of the Russian Federation; Order of the Red Star; Order of Military Merit; Order of Courage; Order of Merit for the Fatherland

Military service
- Allegiance: Russia
- Branch/service: Armed Forces of the Russian Federation
- Years of service: 1969–2009
- Rank: Army General
- Commands: Main Intelligence Directorate
- Battles/wars: Cold War; First Chechen War; Second Chechen War; Russo-Georgian War

Army General Valentin Vladimirovich Korabelnikov (Note: Russian: Валентин Владимирович Корабельников) (born 4 January 1946) is a retired Russian military officer best known for being the longest serving director of the Main Intelligence Directorate (GRU) for nearly 12 years.

== Biography ==
Korabelnikov attended the Minsk Higher Engineering Anti-Aircraft Rocket School of Air Defense, from which he graduated in 1969, and subsequently graduated from the M. V. Frunze Military Academy in 1974 and the General Staff Academy in 1988.

In May 1997, Korabelnikov was appointed Chief of the Main Intelligence Directorate (GRU) of the Russian General Staff, Russia's largest intelligence agency. Korabelnikov worked his way up the GRU hierarchy for 20 years before becoming the Intelligence Directorate's head. Korabelnikov spent time alongside Spetsnaz brigades in Chechnya, while he was reportedly responsible for the operation which resulted in the elimination of Chechen President Dzhokhar Dudayev in 1996. Korabelnikov often involved himself personally in operational work, and was reportedly wounded by Chechen fighters.

In July 1999, Korabelnikov received an official acknowledgment from president Boris Yeltsin for his "significant contribution to the settlement of the Kosovo Conflict". He was a member of Russian delegation, led by Prime Minister Yevgeny Primakov that met with Slobodan Milosevic during the NATO bombing of Yugoslavia.

On 24 April 2009, President Dmitry Medvedev signed a decree dismissing Korabelnikov from his position as head of the GRU's Intelligence Directorate, replacing him with Gen Alexander Shlyakhturov. No reason was given the decision, however Korabelnikov had reportedly tendered his resignation earlier in 2009 due to disagreement over ongoing military reforms.

== Notes ==
Political offices
Preceded by Fyodor Ladygin	Director of the Main Intelligence Directorate; May 1997 – 24 April 2009	Succeeded by Alexander Shlyakhturov
