= Vyacheslav Mironov =

Russian writer

Vyacheslav Nikolaevich Mironov (Russian: Миронов, Вячесла́в Никола́евич) (born January 21, 1961, in Kemerovo) is a Russian writer and officer of the Soviet then Russian army. He participated in several late- and post-Soviet conflicts including events in Transnistria, Gerorgia, The Georgean-Ossetian conflict and the First Chechen War, where he fought in the rank of captain. He has been awarded the Order of Courage. Vyacheslav Mironov was discharged from the Russian Army and is currently serving in the narcotics division of the Kemerovo Oblast Police in the rank of lieutenant-colonel. His most well-known work I Was in this War' Chechnya 95 (Russian: Я был на этой войне. Чечня, год 1995) published in 1999 deals with his experiences in the First Chechen war during the Battle of Grozny in 1995. It has received several awards and commendations for internet literature and has been translated into several languages. Mironov's books are usually fictionalised accounts of real events and deal with military themes surrounding ordinary officers and soldiers serving in the Soviet and Russian armed forces.

== Selected Novels ==
- Я был на этой войне. Чечня, год 1995 (I WAS IN THIS WAR. Chechnya 95) 1999
- Не моя война (Not My War – co-authored with Oleg Makov)
