= Andrei Mironov (footballer, born 1987) =

Russian footballer

Personal information
- Full name: Andrei Vyacheslavovich Mironov
- Date of birth: 15 January 1987 (age 39)
- Height: 1.81 m (5 ft 11 1/2 in)
- Position: Defender

Senior career*
Years	Team	Apps	(Gls)
2004	FC Krylia Sovetov Samara	0	(0)
2005	FC Yunit Samara (amateur)		
2006–2007	FC Krylia Sovetov Samara	0	(0)
2009	FC Nizhny Novgorod	1	(0)
- * Club domestic league appearances and goals

Andrei Vyacheslavovich Mironov (Russian: Андрей Вячеславович Миронов; born 15 January 1987) is a former Russian professional football player.

== Club career ==
He played in the Russian Football National League for FC Nizhny Novgorod in 2009.
