= Order of Courage (Russia) =

State award of the Russian Federation

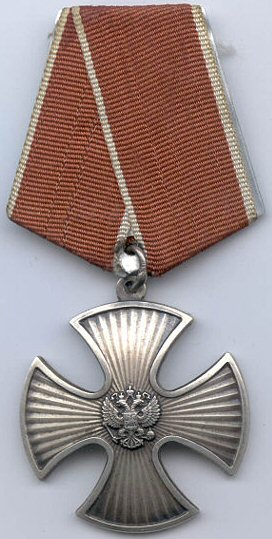
- Order of Courage (obverse)
- Type: Single grade order
- Awarded for: Selfless courage and valour
- Presented by: Russian Federation
- Eligibility: Russian citizens and foreign nationals
- Status: Active
- Established: March 2, 1994
- First award: January 6, 1995
- Ribbon of the Order of Courage

Precedence
- Next (higher): Order of Nakhimov
- Next (lower): Order For Military Merit

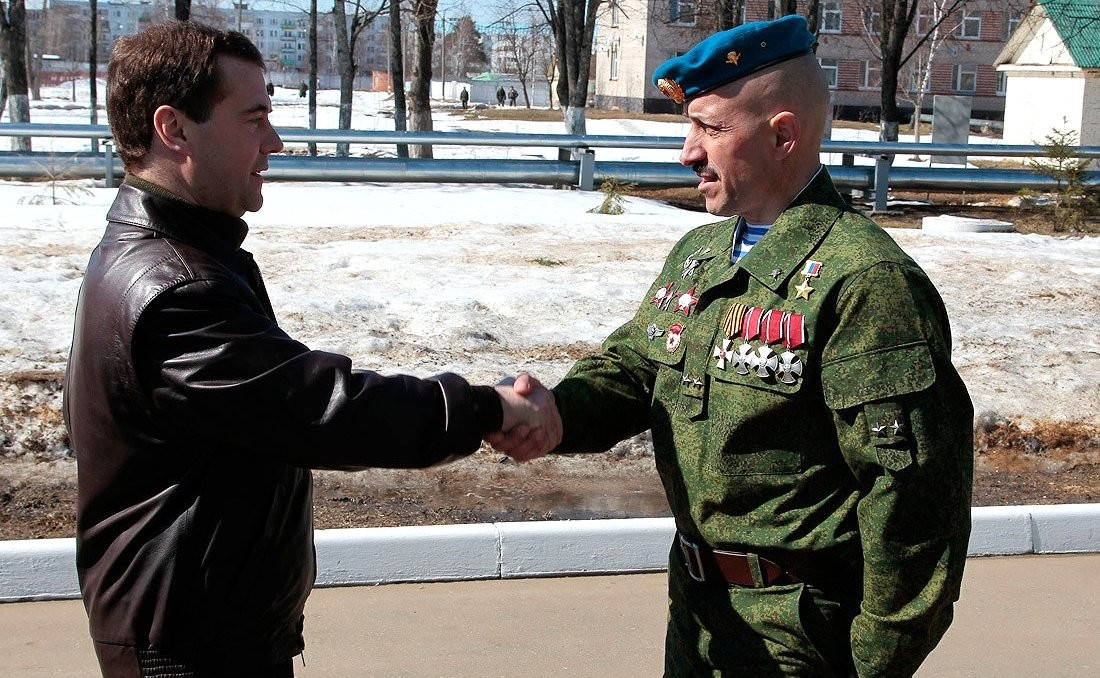
Lt. Col. Lebed, Hero of Russia, Knight of the Order of St. George 4th class and 3 time recipient of the Order of Courage, greeting Russian President Medvedev on April 4, 2011

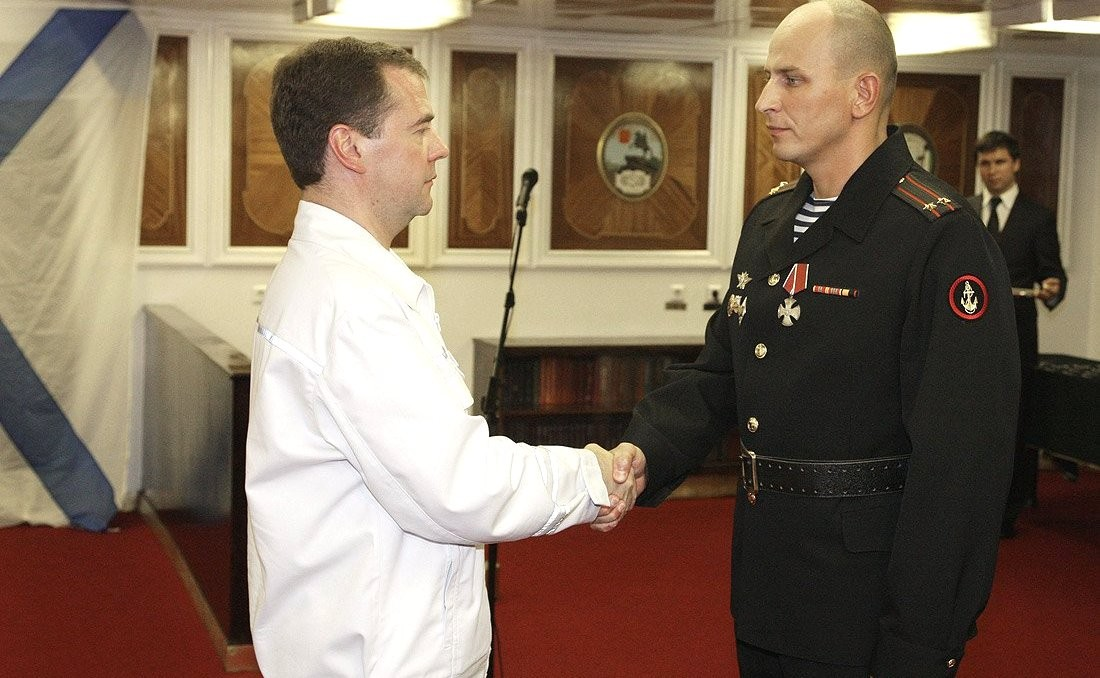
Russian President Dmitry Medvedev awarding the Order of Courage to Naval Infantry Lieutenant Colonel Oleg Kistanov on July 4, 2010, for his actions during the retaking of the Russian tanker MV Moscow University from Somali pirates

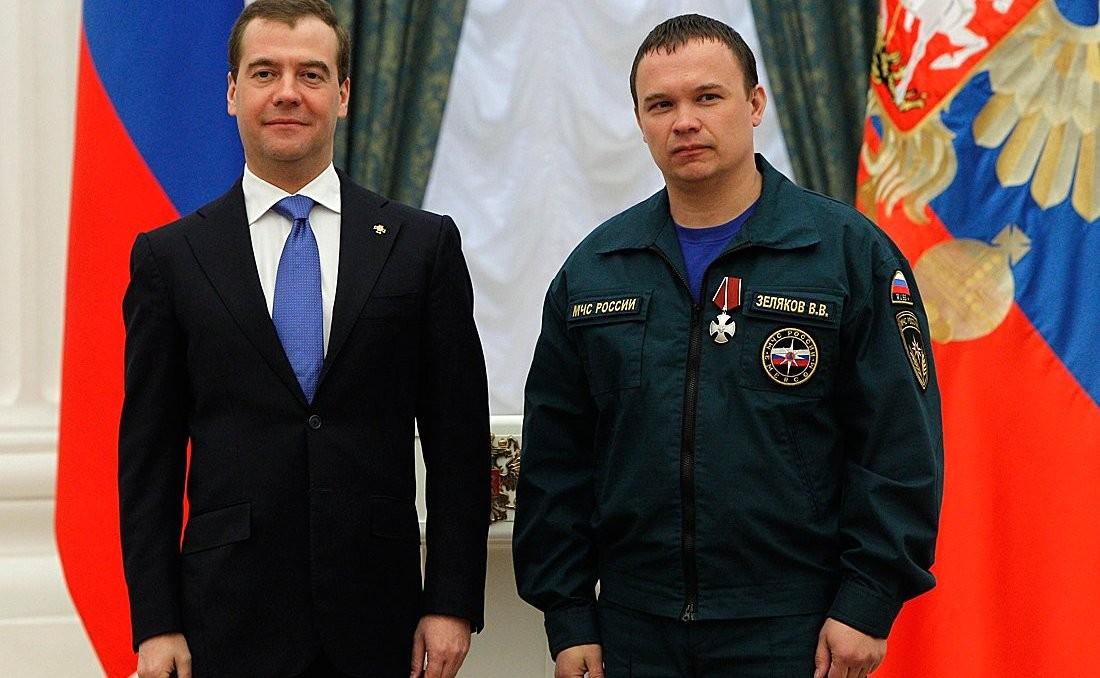
Russian President Dmitry Medvedev awarding the Order of Courage to EMERCOM mine rescue detachment commander Valery Zelyakov on May 3, 2012

The Order of Courage (Russian: Орден Мужества, Orden Muzhestva) is a state decoration of the Russian Federation first established on March 2, 1994, by Presidential Decree 442 to recognise selfless acts of courage and valour. Its statute was amended three times, first on January 6, 1999, by Presidential Decree 19, again on September 7, 2010, by Presidential Decree 1099, and finally on December 16, 2011, by Presidential Decree 1631. The Order of Courage nominally replaced the Soviet Order "For Personal Courage" in the post-USSR Russian awards system.

== Award statute ==
The Order of Courage is awarded to citizens of the Russian Federation who showed dedication, courage and bravery in protecting public order, fighting crime, in rescuing people during natural disasters, fires, accidents and other emergencies, as well as for bold and decisive actions committed during the performance of military or civil duties under conditions involving a risk to life.

The Order of Courage may be awarded posthumously and may be awarded multiple times to the same recipient.

Individuals already awarded three Orders of Courage may be awarded the title of Hero of the Russian Federation for a fourth selfless act of courage.

It may also be awarded to foreign nationals who showed dedication, courage and bravery in the rescue of Russian citizens during natural disasters, fires, accidents and other emergencies outside of the Russian Federation.

The Order of Courage is worn on the left side of the chest and when in the presence of other medals and Orders of the Russian Federation, is located immediately after the Order of Nakhimov.

== Award description ==
The Order of Courage was designed by Yevgeny Ukhnalyov. It is a vaulted 40 mm wide silver cross pattée with rounded ends. The outer rim of both the obverse and reverse are embossed. At the center of the obverse is the state emblem of the Russian Federation. On the obverse, embossed rays extend outwards from the center to the outer rim in each of the cross's four arms. In the center of the reverse, the relief inscription in stylized Russian Cyrillic «МУЖЕСТВО» ("COURAGE"). On the reverse of the lower cross arm, an "N" in relief and a horizontal line reserved for the award serial number, under the line, a maker's mark.

The badge of the Order of Courage hangs from a standard Russian pentagonal mount with a ring through its suspension loop. The mount is covered by an overlapping 24 mm wide red silk moiré ribbon with 2 mm white edge stripes.

== Recipients (partial list) ==
The individuals listed below were recipients of the Order of Courage:

- Lieutenant Colonel Anatoly Vyacheslavovich Lebed (three times)
- Tatyana Sapunova
- Militia Lieutenant Colonel Vyacheslav Nikolaevich Mironov
- Lieutenant General and politician Alu Dadashevich Alkhanov
- Colonel Marina Lavrentievna Popovich
- President of Chechnya Ramzan Akhmadovich Kadyrov
- Former Interior, Justice and Prime Minister of Russia Sergei Vadimovich Stepashin
- Colonel and President of the Republic of Ingushetia Yunus-bek Bamatgireyevich Yevkurov
- Captain Sergey Vladimirovich Perets
- Fleet Admiral Vladimir Nikolayevich Chernavin
- Lieutenant General Vladimir Anatolyevich Shamanov
- Former Justice Minister Vladimir Vasilyevich Ustinov (twice)
- Lieutenant General, former President of the Republic of Ingushetia Murat Magometovich Zyazikov
- Iosif Davydovich Kobzon
- Private Yevgeny Aleksandrovich Rodionov (posthumous)
- Professor Maksud Sadikov (posthumous)
- Colonel General, former Interior Minister of Russia Vladimir Borisovich Rushailo
- Army General Anatoly Vasiliyevich Kvashnin
- Army General Nikolai Platonovich Patrushev
- Admiral of the Fleet Ivan Matveyevich Kapitanets
- Scientist, physicist, Evgeny Pavlovich Velikhov
- Major General Viktor Nikolaevich Bondarev
- Major General Vladimir Zavadsky
- Explorer Anatoly Mikhailovich Sagalevich
- Major General Oleg Aleksandrovich Kozlov
- Army General Valentin Vladimirovich Korabelnikov
- Colonel General Nikolay Nikolayevich Bordyuzha
- Colonel General Arkady Viktotovich Bakhin
- Colonel Said-Magomed Kakiyev (twice)
- Militia Captain Viktor Mikhailovich Adamishin (posthumous)
- Alexander Ivanovich Bedritsky
- French Brigadier General and astronaut Léopold Eyharts
- Oleg Kukhta
- Grigoriy Mihaylovich Naginskiy
- Zakhar Prilepin
- NASA astronaut Colonel Nick Hague, USSF
- Vitaly Churkin (posthumous)
- Alexander Pechersky (posthumous)
- Arsen Sergeyevich Pavlov (posthumous)
- Darya Dugina (posthumous)
- Gera Chausheva
- Kirill Stremousov (posthumous)
- Sergei Puskepalis (posthumous)
- Vladlen Tatarsky (posthumous)
- Michael Gloss (posthumous)

== See also ==
- Awards and decorations of the Russian Federation
