= Yelizaveta Mironova =

Soviet sniper (1924–1943)

Yelizaveta Fyodorovna Mironova
- Елизавета Фёдоровна Миронова
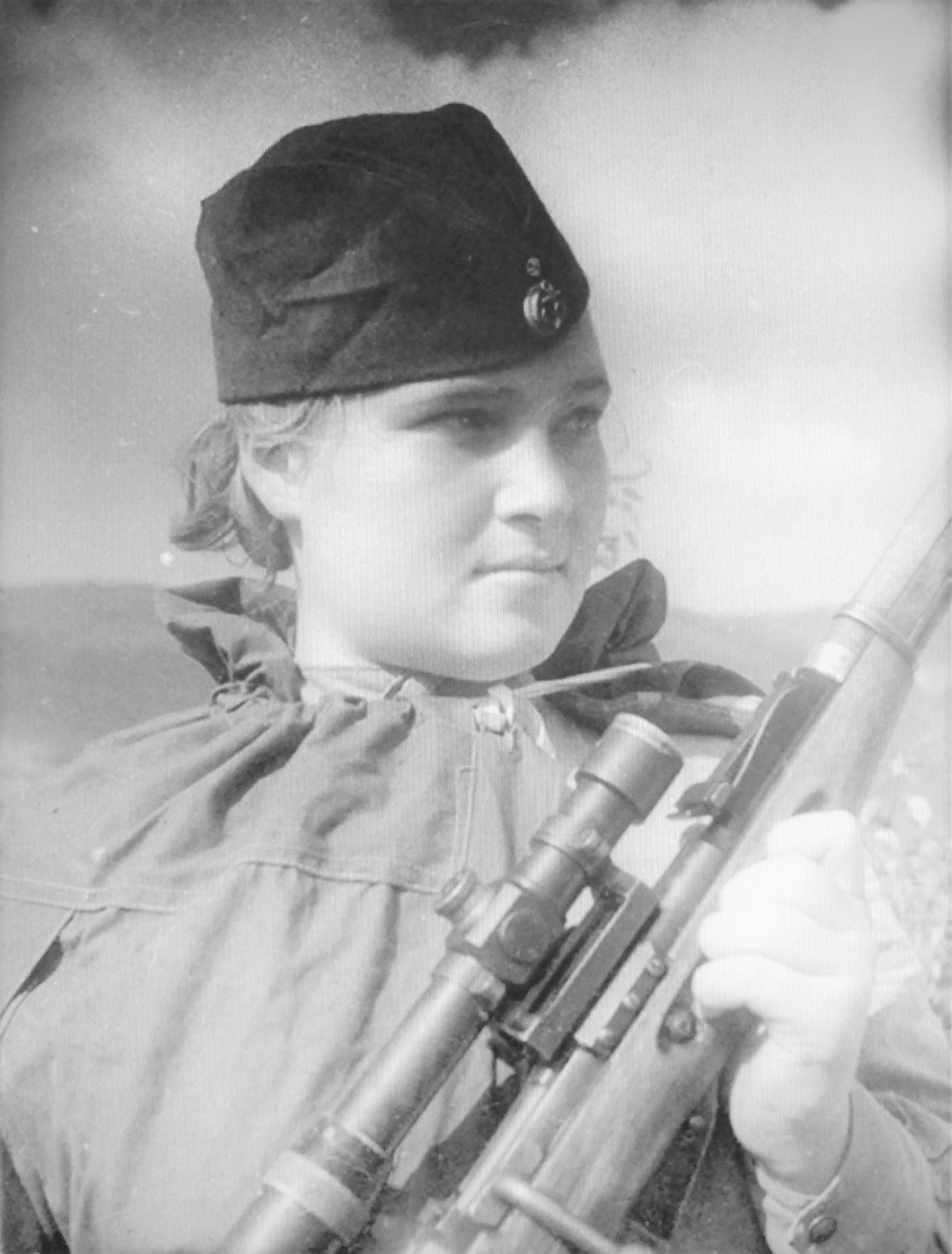
- Born: 1924
- Died: 29 September 1943 (aged 18–19); Gelendzhik, Krasnodar Krai
- Military career
- Allegiance: Soviet Union
- Branch: Soviet Navy
- Rank: Corporal
- Unit: 255th Red Banner Marine Corps Brigade
- Conflicts: World War II †

Yelizaveta "Liza" Fyodorovna Mironova (Russian: Елизавета Фёдоровна Миронова; 1924 – 29 September 1943) was a Soviet sniper during the Second World War. She has been alternately credited with either 34, or "more than a hundred" kills.
