= Korovin =

Korovin (Russian: Коровин), or Korovina (feminine; Коровина), is a Russian last name, which is derived from the Russian word korova (корова, or cow). Notable persons with that surname include:

- Hal Korovin (1925–2021), American professional basketball player
- Ilya Korovin (1923–1944), Soviet army officer and Hero of the Soviet Union
- Konstantin Korovin (1861–1939), leading Russian Impressionist painter
- Nikolai Korovin (1920–1957), Soviet aircraft pilot and Hero of the Soviet Union
- Sergei Korovin (1858–1908), Russian painter and brother of Konstantin Korovin
- Sergei Korovin (designer) (1884–1946), Soviet firearm designer
- Yevgeny Korovin (botanist) (1891–1963), Soviet botanist and academician
- Evgeny A. Korovin (1892–1964), Soviet international lawyer

== See also ==
- Korovin Island, one of the islands in the Gulf of Alaska
- Korovin pistol, a Soviet pistol
- Korovin Volcano, the highest point on Atka Island in the Aleutian chain
