= Civil Protection in Switzerland =

Body in Switzerland to assist in disasters

Civil Protection
- (in German) Zivilschutz (in French) Protection civile (in Italian) Protezione civile

Agency overview
- Jurisdiction: Federal administration of Switzerland
- Status: Assistance, Pioneering, Driving assistance, Rescue, Support
- Headquarters: Switzerland
- Parent department: Federal Office for Civil Protection
- Website: http://www.protectioncivile.ch/

Civil Protection in Switzerland (CP) (German: Zivilschutz, ZS; Italian: Protezione civile, PC; French: Protection civile, PCi) is a body organized into 26 cantonal divisions, whose aim is to provide assistance to the population in the event of disasters or other harmful events. It is one of the five pillars of civil protection, alongside the fire department, police, technical services, and health services (ambulances, hospitals, etc.). The management of these divisions is the responsibility of the cantons.

The cantonal divisions are subdivided into "OPC" (communal) civil protection organizations and "ORPC" (regional) civil protection organizations. A region, as defined by the CP, is a grouping of communes. This type of organization is found particularly in rural areas, where the budget and number of personnel are too limited for a single commune.

The CP comprises five different areas: assistance to leadership (including telematics, situation monitoring and Atomic-Bacteria-Chemics protection - ABC protection), assistance, support, protection of cultural property (PBC) and logistics.

== Mission ==
The CP is a 2nd-level means of protecting the population. In other words, it intervenes as soon as the 1st echelon or immediate emergency partners (police, fire brigade, medical services) can no longer manage a situation due to a lack of resources or manpower. The CP has to deal with emergency situations of great scope in terms of time and/or size.

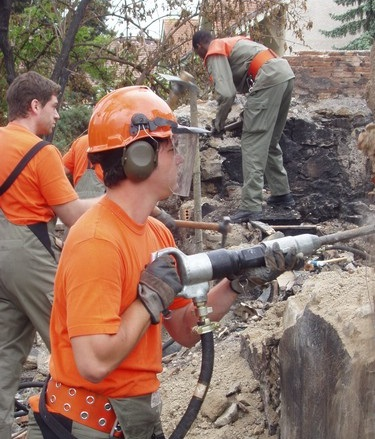
Supporting pioneer.

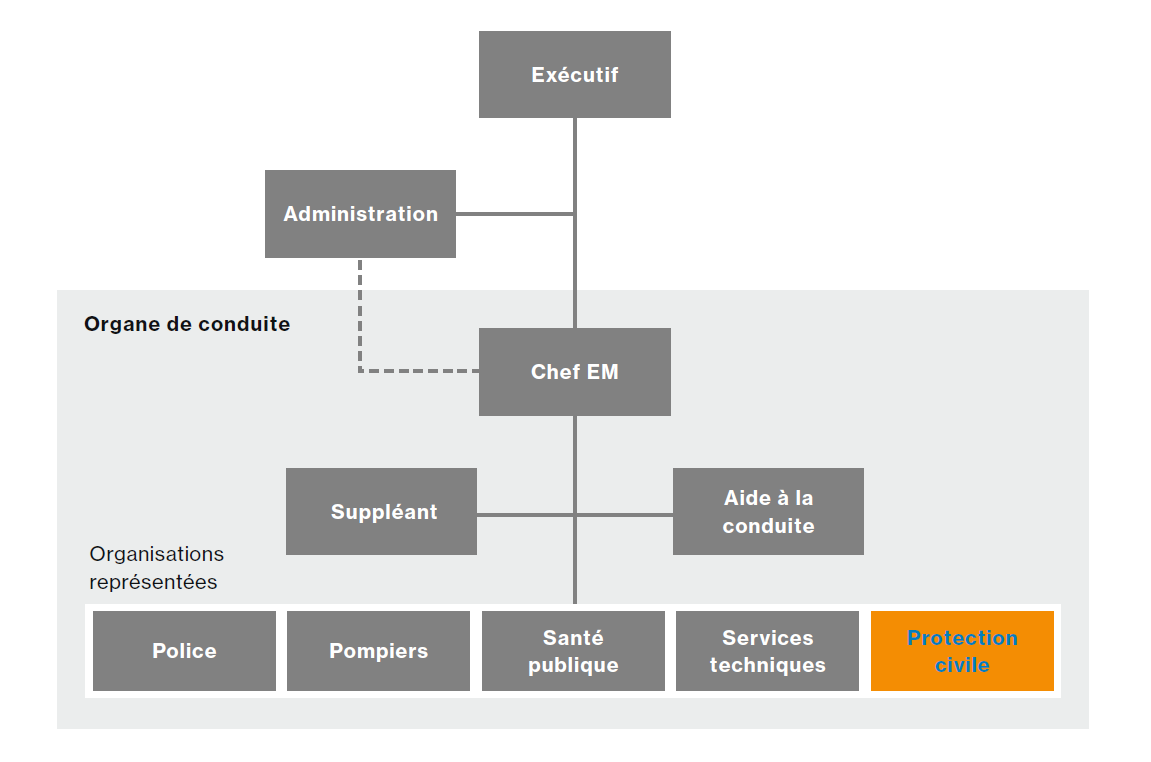
Structure of a regional steering committee (RSC)

In the event of large-scale emergencies or disasters, operations are managed at municipal or regional level by a regional steering committee (RSC). This is made up of all the partners (first and second level) and is managed by a municipal executive, who appoints a chief of staff and a deputy.

The following article from the Federal Law on Civil Protection defines the role of the CP:

"Civil protection is responsible for protecting the population, assisting people seeking protection, protecting cultural property, supporting the lead bodies and other partner organizations, as well as carrying out rehabilitation work and interventions on behalf of the community." - Federal Law on Civil Protection, Article 3, paragraph e.

The role of the CP is very extensive. Depending on their training, CP members may be assigned to rescue operations, staff management, communications, traffic management, radiation protection, etc.

== History ==
=== Origin ===
The first civil protection-type organization was created by the Physician General Georges Saint-Paul, who had been deeply affected by the atrocities of World War I. The association Les Lieux de Genève was created on 28 May 1931.

The idea of Les Lieux de Genève came to me in Soissons during the winter of 1914-1915, and was confirmed in my mind in 1918 when I saw part of the population of the Somme under fire.

— Georges Saint-Paul, 1931.

The aim of this association, recognized by the French Chamber of Deputies in 1935, was to create neutralized zones where civilians, especially the most vulnerable, could find refuge. In 1937, Georges Saint-Paul asked for the association to be transferred to Geneva, where it became the International Association for the Protection of Civilian Populations and Historic Buildings in Time of War.

In 1949, at the instigation of the Swiss government, the Geneva Conventions were revised and expanded. As a result, signatory countries were required to provide safety zones and localities for the civilian population.

=== Creation of civil defense in Switzerland ===
In the 1950s, after World War II, the vision of threats changed radically, notably due to the use of the atomic bomb. The International Association for the Protection of Civilian Populations and Historic Buildings in Time of War became the International Civil Defence Organization in 1958, in order to facilitate exchanges and experiences of population protection throughout the world.

For their part, Swiss parliamentarians debated the establishment of a nationwide protection structure to enable the population to cope with the growing threats around the country, in particular the risks generated by the Cold War. The people accepted a constitutional amendment incorporating civil protection. A law was then drafted and implemented a few years later.

Thus, on 1 January 1963, civil protection came into being in Switzerland.

A special feature of the Swiss civil protection system was the creation of fallout shelters for all inhabitants. The threat of nuclear war between the United States and the Soviet Union was very serious, and the risk of a nuclear catastrophe in a country like Switzerland, situated between the two blocs, was high. These shelters were the leitmotif of Swiss civil protection until the fall of the Berlin Wall.

=== After the Cold War ===
In the 1990s, the international political climate changed radically. The threat of a nuclear holocaust receded, and the mission of Swiss civil protection had to be reviewed. Parliamentarians began to think about reorienting the CP's remit. They began to focus on protection against natural and man-made disasters.

This new organization became official with the advent of the Army XXI reform in 2004, containing the Federal Law on Civil Protection System and Protection & Support Service (German: Bundesgesetz über den Bevölkerungsschutz und den Zivilschutz, BZG; Italian: Legge federale sulla protezione della popolazione e sulla protezione civile, LPPC; French: Loi fédérale sur la protection de la population et sur la protection civile, LPPCi), accepted by the people in the vote of 18 May 2003.

=== Nowadays ===
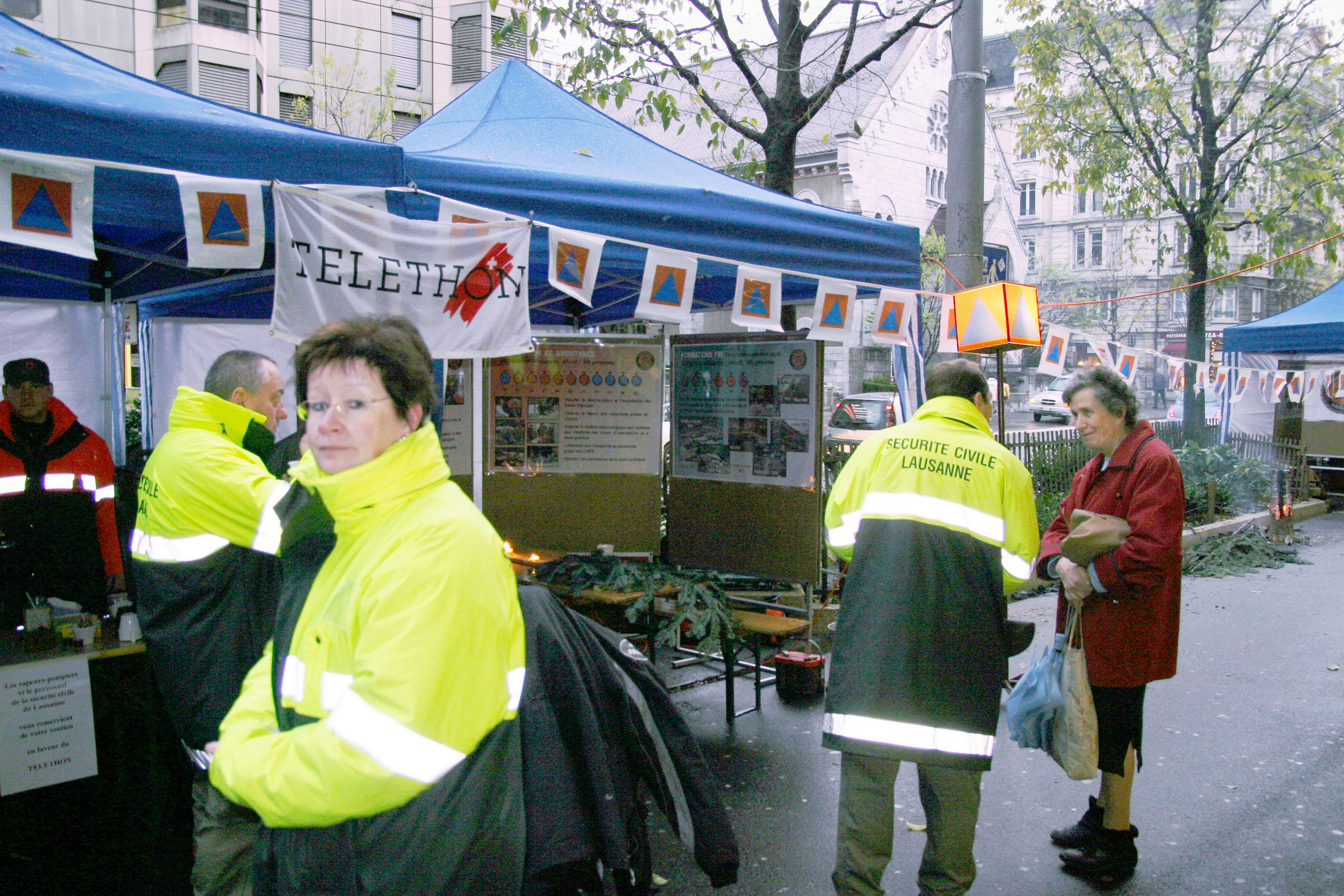
Civil Defense stand in Lausanne for the 2006 Telethon.

Civil protection plays a major role in disaster relief, as it did during the Gondo landslide on 14 October 2000, or during severe storms such as "Lothar" in December 1999 or "Andrea" in January 2012.

In calm weather, it also participates in numerous community interventions, providing manpower to manage traffic and provide assistance and rescue at events such as the 20 km of Lausanne, the Geneva Marathon, or the Geneva demonstration against the G8 Summit in Evian in 2003. The CP also makes its shelters available during extreme cold and when large numbers of refugees arrive.

In March 2020, for the first time since its creation in the 1950s, it was formally mobilized by the Federal Council and cantonal authorities as part of the fight against the COVID-19 pandemic.

== Recruitment ==
Civil Protection was made up of people who, generally for medical, psychological or physical reasons, had been declared unfit for military service, but who were nonetheless fit for the CP, or of citizens who had completed their military service. They had to serve until the age of 50.

Since the Army XXI reform, joint recruitment has been carried out for the army and civil protection. Examinations, aptitude tests and interviews will determine where conscripts are assigned. The army has priority in the selection of conscripts, in order to best meet its objectives. Conscripts also express their wishes as to their assignment. Conscripts are required to serve until the age of 40 (with the possibility of remaining a volunteer after the age of 40, after confirmation of their medical fitness by the doctors at their regional recruitment center).

If a male citizen is not serving in the army, he must pay a military tax equivalent to 3% of his annual salary, but at least CHF 400 per year. The same applies to members of the Civil Protection forces, but with a 4% reduction for each day of service, up to a maximum of 60% per year. In addition, civil protection members pay the tax only up to the age of 30, instead of 40.

Swiss women can also become members of the CP, either by volunteering, or by going to a recruitment center if they so wish after the army presentation day (compulsory for all adult male citizens). In the latter case, they become "astreintes" and are obliged to serve until the age of 40. However, they do not pay military tax.

Foreigners resident in Switzerland (B and C permits) can join the CP on a voluntary basis.

== Instruction ==
Upon recruitment, trainees (or recruits) are assigned to one of three possible basic training courses, lasting between one and three weeks.

=== GI: General instruction ===
General training lasts four days. It consists of teaching recruits the basics of CPR. This includes CPR (cardiopulmonary resuscitation) certification, knowledge of safety rules, hazards and the types of situations encountered, stopping low-level fires, and use of CP shelters. All CP personnel are subject to GI.

=== SI: Specialized instruction ===
The SI follows the GI and lasts six days. It is used to train recruits for their functional area (driving assistance; assistance; support). This area is chosen in advance during recruitment, with the help of the CP recruitment officer.

=== CI: Complementary instruction ===
Once they have completed the SI, conscripts who wish to do so can follow a Complementary Training (CI) course of variable duration, to be incorporated in the protection of cultural property domain, the ABC protection section (driving assistance domain), or the logistics domain (as a chef, cook or accountant).

== Organization ==
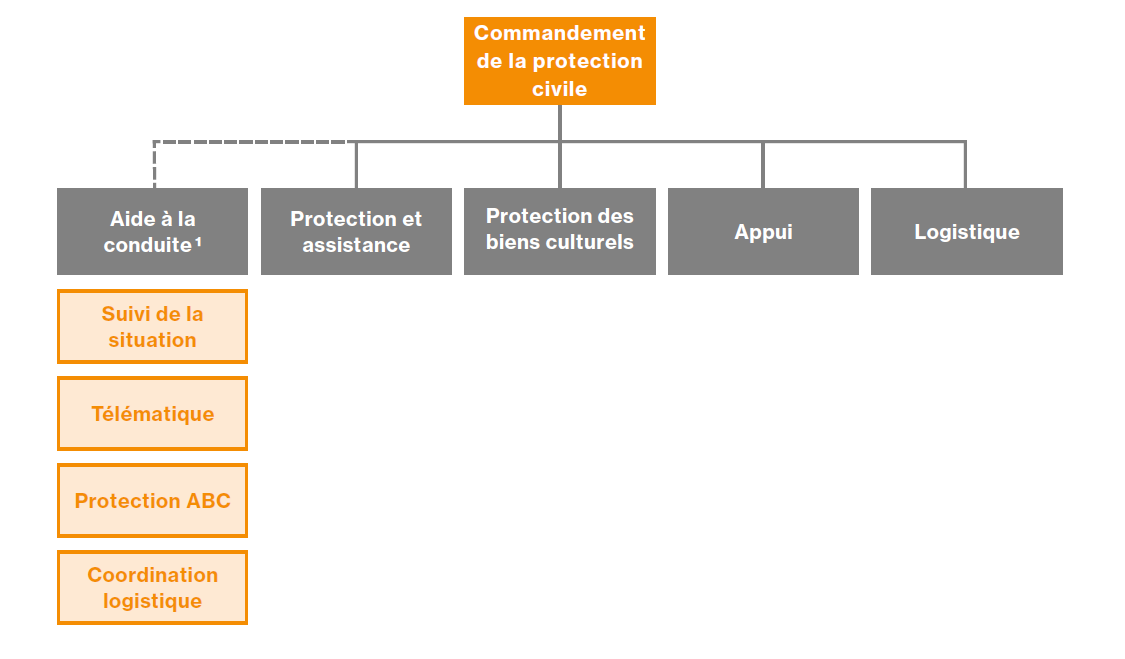
OPC/ORPC structure

An OPC/ORPC is organized as follows:

=== Command and Staff ===
Comprising the commanding officer, his deputy and the members of the EM, i.e. the heads of the assistance, support, logistics and PCP domains, and the various heads of the driving assistance sections (monitoring, telematics, logistics coordination, Atomic-Chemics protection - AC protection), its role is to manage the OPC/ORPC, prepare future exercises and interventions for the community, check the status of personnel and equipment, and manage the administration (if a PC Office does not exist within the municipal administration).

=== Domains ===
Consisting one or more sections, each domain is assigned its own specific tasks (see next paragraph). They are under the responsibility of an area manager. His role is to supervise assigned operations and inform command of their progress and any additional requirements. With the exception of driving assistance and logistics, all areas have sections with identical skills.

=== Sections ===
Made up of one or more groups, a section's task is to accomplish the mission for which it has been formed. The section leader can divide roles between his groups. For example, an assistance section may have one group dealing with a nest of wounded, while another group is providing psychological assistance to physically unharmed victims.

The section leader, together with his or her domain leader, must ensure that knowledge is maintained and that sufficient personnel are available to accomplish the mission.

=== Groups ===
Made up of men of rank their non-commissioned officers (group leaders), groups must carry out the tasks assigned to them in the field. The group leader must report to his officer on the progress of his work, make the best use of the soldiers according to their specializations, and supervise them.

== Functions ==
=== Base functions ===
==== Assistance ====
They may also be responsible for providing assistance to refugees in the event of large-scale migration, and for supporting the health services, for example in the event of the activation of a protected ("underground") health center. They are also responsible for checking the condition of private shelters, which are compulsory for virtually every building owner in Switzerland.

==== Support and pioneering ====
Pioneers are responsible for rescue work at disaster sites (front-line rescue), as well as consolidation, clearing and, ultimately, restoration work. To this end, they are skilled in the use of a wide range of equipment, including chainsaws, generators, fork-lifts, water pumps, fire shears and stretchers. Good safety skills are essential, given the dangers involved.

==== Driving assistance ====
Staff members are responsible for monitoring the situation in the event of a disaster, providing the RSC with the information they need to make decisions, and ensuring effective coordination between the various response forces. They are also responsible for communications (radio, installation of field telephone lines, etc.). There are also AC specialists. As a result, the driving assistance field is made up of heterogeneous sections: telematics, situation monitoring (topography), AC detection, logistics coordination (with other partners). Soldiers who have been trained in driver assistance are not eligible for command of an OPC/ORPC, since their skills are used directly by the head of the RSC, as opposed to other areas where the skills belong to the OPC/ORPC commander.

The duration and organization of training are managed by the cantons. In large cantons such as Grisons, recruits sleep in their recruit schools throughout the week. On the other hand, city cantons such as Geneva let recruits leave every evening, due to the short distances they have to travel to get home.

At the end of their training, recruits become members of the civil protection and receive a certificate as well as their pay.

=== Voluntary functions ===
These domains are equivalent to those mentioned above, with the difference that their workforce is trained on a voluntary basis after compulsory training.

PBC's international hallmark.

==== Protection of cultural property (PCP) ====
The aim of the Protection of Cultural Property (PCP) domain is to identify, protect, archive, and rescue important cultural works. Protected cultural property and PBC officers are marked with an international distinctive sign. As a specialized field, the size of which varies according to the number of cultural assets inventoried on the O(R)PC's territory, there are often only a few embedded staff. As a result, the domain is often reduced to a domain manager (an officer who is a member of the EM) and specialists (with the rank of soldier, or at best a salaried employee); some cantons provide for the function of PBC group manager (non-commissioned officer). One of the tasks of the PBC is to draw up a salvage sheet for each item of cultural property, in order to facilitate its evacuation by the fire service and prevent further damage during transport to a storage shelter or restorer. The rescue sheet includes information such as the object's location in the building, the route to be taken to reach it, and the number of people required to extract it.

==== Logistics ====
The role of this department is to manage the smooth running of the CP. It includes accounting, supplies, and maintenance of equipment and buildings.

== Specializations ==
Specializations are in fact the perfecting of a specific task within a domain. The specializations currently available are :

- Driving assistance: TETRAPOL dispatcher, telephone centralist, radiation protection specialist, A (atomic) detector;
- Assistance: psychological support, health care;
- Logistics: cook, equipment clerk, construction clerk, driver.

The support area has no specialization.

Enlisted PBC personnel are considered specialists (spec PBC), and in some cantons have the rank of "appointé". In some cantons, they may undergo executive training to become a group leader (NCO: c gr PBC). The Federal Office for Civil Protection, and more specifically its Cultural Property Protection Section, is responsible for training the domain manager (C PBC).

== Grades and badges ==
CP ranks are based on those of the Swiss Army, with the difference that there are fewer of them.

Since the introduction of the new uniforms, the ranks and badges are made in the same way as those of the Swiss army, with Velcro on the chest, on the left of the basic equipment jacket, and on the fleece. The company badge appears on the right arm, if worn.

	Men of rank		Non-commissioned officers		Senior non-commissioned officers
Rank OTAN	OR-1a	OR-2	OR-4	OR-5b	OR-6	OR-7b
Badge
Title	Soldat	Appointé	Caporal	Sergent	Sergent-major	Fourrier
Abbreviation	Sdt	App	Cpl	Sgt	Sgtm	Four
Function	Soldier	Specialist	Group Leader	Group Leader	Logistics Manager	Accountant

	Subordinate officers			Officiers supérieurs
Rank OTAN	OF-1b	OF-1a	OF-2	OF-3	OF-4	OF-5
Badge
Title	Lieutenant	Premier-lieutenant	Capitaine	Major	Lieutenant-colonel	Colonel
Abbreviation	Lt	Plt	Cap	Maj	Lt-Col	Col
Function	Section/area manager	Section manager/assistant/commander	Domain manager/assistant/commander	Commander/Alternate	Commander/Alternate	Commander

Appointés and sergeants are ranks of distinction for good service (minimum 5 years in the previous rank). They can also deputize for their direct superiors. The rank of first lieutenant can also be awarded in this capacity.

There are no general officers in civil protection.

The rank of an OPC/ORPC commander (and respectively of his deputy) depends on the size of his staff.

Soldiers can apply for a higher rank if they volunteer and if their superiors accept their request. However, in the rare case of necessity, access to the higher rank is compulsory.

=== Badges ===
Each CP member receives a badge designating his or her function, which is attached with Velcro under the name. It is possible to obtain several badges, each designating a skill acquired through training.

=== Domain colors (functions) ===
Each function has its own color, to easily identify the role of the on-call personnel, as shown on the shoulder straps or nameplate.

Here's the list:

(commander and alternate)	Driving assistance	Support	Assistance	Protection of cultural property	Logistics

== "PCi" term ==
In French, the civil protection abbreviation "PC" is written with a lower-case "i" to distinguish it from the intervention command post abbreviation "PCi", which is capitalized throughout. In addition, although the term "PC" is often used orally to refer to civil protection, it officially designates the command post.

Example of official wording: "The PC Lausanne has deployed a PCi on the Place de la Gare".

== Vaud Civil Defense ==
The Vaud Civil Protection (PC-VD) is the civil protection body for the Canton of Vaud in Switzerland. It currently comprises 10 ORPCs (1 battalion per district) and 1 cantonal detachment. The cantonal command and training center is located in Gollion.

=== Composition ===
It is made up of ten regions (corresponding to the ten districts), plus the cantonal detachment, for a total of around eight thousand personnel. These regions are headed by a steering committee (CODIR), on which sit representatives of the associated communes; it is responsible for taking the most important decisions in terms of organization, finance and management.

A regional commander, with the rank of major or lieutenant-colonel depending on the size of the staff he leads, is responsible for technical aspects and leadership.

There are obviously close links with the civil and military security services, particularly in terms of training.

== See also ==
- Fallout shelter
- Swiss Armed Forces
- National Emergency Operations Centre
- Federal Office for Civil Protection
- Emergency population warning
- Test des sirènes en Suisse

== Appendix ==
=== Bibliography ===
- ^{(fr)} La Protection civile, OFPP, 2004, pas d'ISBN, read online archive.
- ^{(fr)} La Protection civile vaudoise, Éditions Cabédita.

=== External links ===
- Official website archive
- Entry in a dictionary or general encyclopedia: Historical dictionary of Switzerland archive
- Official website of the Swiss Civil Protection archive
- Virtual visit (panoramic photos) of a building (CP shelter) archive
- Canton of Vaud civil and military security website archive
- Official website of the civil protection of the canton of Vaud archive
