= Cultural heritage protection in Switzerland =

The Swiss Agency for the Protection of Cultural Property defines measures to protect cultural property against damage, destruction, theft and loss. For this purpose, a legal basis has been established at the national level and international agreements have been made that oblige Switzerland to respect and support the protection of cultural property not only on its own territory but also on the sovereign territory of other state parties.

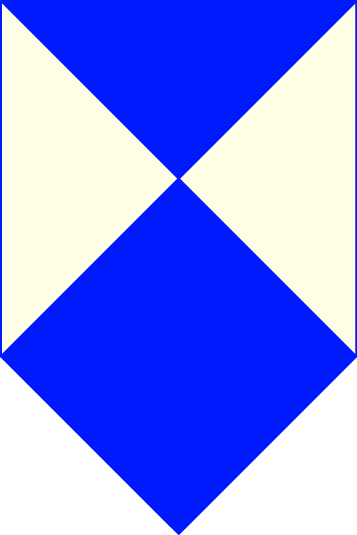
Emblem of the Hague Convention for the Protection of Cultural Property in the Event of Armed Conflict

== History ==
The history of the protection of cultural property in its current form began with the massive destruction of cultural property during the Second World War. When the UN was founded in 1945, UNESCO was established as one of the 17 special agencies of the United Nations dealing with questions relating to education, science and culture. Even today, it continues to be the 'mother organisation' for international protection of cultural property. Thus, UNESCO also took the lead when in 1954 the Hague Convention for the Protection of Cultural Property in the Event of Armed Conflict (HAC) was consolidated by international law. Switzerland joined the HAC 1962 and ratified the 'Protocol to the Convention for the Protection of Cultural Property in the Event of Armed Conflict 1954' (Second Protocol) in 2004, which augments the HAC since 1999.

== Definition ==
According to Art. 1 of the Hague Convention of 14 May 1954 for the Protection of Cultural Property in the Event of Armed Conflict (HAC), cultural property is defined as follows:

- Movable or immovable property of great importance to the cultural heritage of every people

such as monuments of architecture, art or history, whether religious or secular; archaeological sites; groups of buildings which, as a whole, are of historical or artistic interest; works of art; manuscripts, books and other objects of artistic, historical or archaeological interest; as well as scientific collections and important collections of books or archives or of reproductions of the property defined above

- Buildings whose main and effective purpose is to preserve or exhibit the movable cultural property defined in sub-paragraph (a)

such as museums, large libraries and depositories of archives, and refuges intended to shelter, in the event of armed conflicts, the movable cultural property defined above.

- Centres containing monuments

i.e. locations with a large amount of cultural property as defined in above paragraphs.

== Organisation ==
The interests of the protection of cultural heritage are acknowledged at federal, cantonal and communal levels. In addition, several cultural institutions and associations as well as private entities are committed to the preservation and protection of Swiss cultural assets. At the federal level the Section for the Protection of Cultural Property has the lead. It is part of the Federal Office for Civil Protection (Federal Department of Defence, Civil Protection and Sport DDPS) – The section serves as reference point for all questions relating to the protection of cultural property in Switzerland. Its main tasks include the support and promotion of the cantons in carrying out the prescribed measures, the issue of directives and guidelines for specialist training, training of top PCP cadre within the context of civil defence, the funding of non-constructional measures to safeguard cultural assets of national or regional importance and the establishment and consolidation of contacts with domestic and foreign partner organisations. The Federal Committee for the Protection of Cultural Property (formerly the Swiss Committee for the Protection of Cultural Property) supports the DDPS and the Federal Office for Civil Protection FOCP as an advisory body. Delegates from the departments of the federal administration, cantonal offices (monument conservation and archaeology) and cultural institutions (archives, museums and libraries) are members of this extra-parliamentary committee. They are nominated by the Federal Council. The relevant contacts for questions relating to the protection of cultural property in the cantons are the cantonal officers for the protection of cultural property. They are either employed by the cantonal cultural division – usually by the historic monuments section – or by the Federal Office for Civil Protection. As specialist agencies, the historic monuments sections bring in the expertise for dealing with objects, while the civil defence organisation provides the human resources for local and regional operations. Apart from these authorities, Switzerland has numerous other partners and institutions that contribute to the preservation of its cultural heritage: the cultural institutions (archives, museums, libraries), the civil protection's partner organisations (primarily fire services and police) or private entities such as the Swiss Association for the Protection of Cultural Property. At the international level we should mention, apart from UNESCO, primarily the signatory states of the Hague Convention and its Second Protocol. Furthermore, several nongovernmental organisations such as ICOM (International Council of Museums), ICOMOS (International Council on Monuments and Sites), IFLA (International Federation of Library Associations and Institutions) and ICA (International Council on Archives) play an important role. Another important partner with regard to international law is the International Committee of the Red Cross (ICRC), that takes the protection of cultural property into account within the context of its humanitarian activities.

== Dangers ==
Most threats to cultural property can be divided into three categories: constant dangers, peacetime incidents and incidents related to armed conflict. Constant threats are primarily theft, vandalism, air pollution, infestation by pests or fungus, deterioration due to aging, ignorance or indifference. An example for this category of danger is the fire of the Chapel Bridge in Lucerne in August 1993. It is suspected that the fire was caused by a carelessly discarded cigarette. Peacetime dangers are primarily technical such as damage like flooding and natural events such as earthquakes, storms or avalanches. We refer to the floods in the summer of 2005 as a respective example. They affected cultural property in various parts of Switzerland; for example at the Collections Centre of the Museum of Transport in Lucerne or in the Benedictine convent of St. Andreas in Sarnen. Destruction through war, acquisition by force and removal of cultural property is as old as the history of humanity. In warfare the use of weapons and explosives has particularly detrimental effect on cultural property. In recent military conflicts – for example during the Balkan wars – a greater number of campaigns were carried out to deliberately destroy cultural assets, which promoted the birth of the Second Protocol. Terrorist attacks are also increasingly and deliberately directed against cultural assets. The destruction of Buddha statues in Afghanistan by the Taliban in the spring of 2001 provides an example for this. In Switzerland, which was largely spared armed conflicts in its younger history, current protection of cultural property focuses primarily on measures against technological dangers, natural events and vandalism.

== Protective measures ==
a) Inventory

The third edition of the current 'Swiss Inventory of Cultural Assets of National and Regional Importance' was authorised by the Federal Council in 2009 (earlier editions: 1988, 1995). The objects of national importance ('A' objects) pertaining to individual buildings, archaeology as well as collections (holdings from museums, archives and libraries) were evaluated and assessed according to uniform criteria. The inventory can be viewed in the Internet either as a print publication or within the Geographic Information System (GIS). The PCP Inventory is currently being updated. The revised version should come into effect by 2021. Apart from this inventory, various others exist in accordance with Article 5 of the Federal Act on the Protection of Nature and Cultural Heritage (NCHA) that are listed here as cross references to the protection of cultural property: the Inventory of Swiss Heritage Sites (ISOS), the Inventory of Swiss Historic Roads (IHR) as well as the Federal Inventory of Landscapes and Natural Monuments of National Importance (ILNM).

b) Security documentation

According to article 5 'Federal Act on the Protection of Cultural Property in the Event of Armed Conflict, Disaster or Emergency Situations' of 2014 (PCPA), the cantons are responsible for documenting security measures to safeguard immovable cultural assets that are particularly worthy of protection and to make security copies of mobile cultural assets that are particularly worthy of protection. Such documentation will enable the restoration or reconstruction of these cultural assets if they are damaged or destroyed. For the compilation of security documentation as much information on the object as possible is collected and stored on microfilm (photographic and photogrammetric recordings, construction plans, restoration reports, archaeological documentation, historic sources, literature as well as inventories and detailed descriptions).

c) Microfilm

For long-term archiving purposes, microfilm is currently regarded as the most reliable storage medium because with correct storage it can be kept for several hundred years. The rapid change in IT technology is taken into account in as far as it has been possible for some time now to make microfilms from digital data. Important documents from archives and libraries, but also security documentation are microfilmed and the films are deposited at a safe location. The Confederation is, according to the 'Ordinance on the Protection of Cultural Property in the Event of Armed Conflict, Disaster or Emergency Situations' (PCPO), responsible for the storage of security copies from the cantons at a 'safe location' – at the federal microfilm archive in Heimiswil (canton of Bern).

d) Shelters for the protection of cultural property

There are currently more than 300 shelters in Switzerland for the protection of cultural property with a total volume of more than 85,000 m2 and 227,000 m3. They serve as storage space for mobile cultural assets in the case of damage or can even be used today as storerooms for cultural property. Lately, due to diminishing funds, already existing shelters have increasingly been converted into shelters for the protection of cultural property.

e) Emergency planning

Article 5 para. 4 of the Federal Act on the Protection of Cultural Property in the Event of Armed Conflict, Disasters and Emergencies requires the cantons to prepare measures to protect their cultural heritage from a range of hazards, including fire, building collapse, flooding, earthquakes and landslides, and to draw up an emergency plan. In 2018 the Federal Commission for the Protection of Cultural Property adopted the national strategy 'Cultural Property Protection Planning/Emergency Planning'. It is based on the Integrated Risk Management model applied by the FOCP and is divided into three main areas of action: prevention/preparedness, intervention and recovery. The aim of the strategy is to mitigate known risks as far as possible through the adoption of the appropriate organisational or structural measures. Mounting a safe and effective response to events caused by emergencies, disasters in peacetime and armed conflict is the focal point of the strategy. It also stipulates that, at every stage of the risk cycle, cultural institutions should know the right questions to ask and the right action to take. Emergency planning is an essential part of cultural property protection efforts. The Civil Protection Ordinance, which comes into force in 2021, contains a provision on federal funding for the construction of purpose-built refuges and the conversion of decommissioned protected facilities into secure repositories for cultural artefacts. Here, the federal government will only provide financial support on the condition that the building project takes the organisational measures required to ensure the safe and long-term storage of cultural property, and that an emergency plan is in place as soon as the shelter enters into operation.

f) Safe Haven

Article 12 of the "Federal Act on the Protection of Cultural Property during Armed Conflicts, Disasters and Emergencies" (CPPA) allows Switzerland to provide a safe haven for the movable cultural assets of other states. The fiduciary custody of cultural property under severe threat in the source state is limited in time and must occur under the auspices of UNESCO. To this end, international treaties are concluded; these also lay down the rules governing such arrangements. The provision of safe havens is in keeping with the Swiss humanitarian tradition. Indeed, Switzerland was the first country in the world to offer refuge of this kind.

g) Training

In the Federal Act on Civil Protection and Civil Defence the protection of cultural property is listed as one of the tasks of civil defence. Cultural property protection personnel is correspondingly trained within the context of civil defence. Throughout Switzerland, approximately 3,000 members of the civil defence staff are currently engaged in the protection of cultural property. The cantons are responsible for training cultural property protection specialists while the Confederation schools its top cadre in the protection of cultural property, the heads of PCP and the cantons provide the training material for the specialist courses. The Confederation is responsible for the uniformity of specialist technical training of cultural property protection personnel and has issued a series of PCP leaflets for PCP officers in cooperation with recognised experts. Furthermore, the Confederation provides information on the protection of cultural property within the context of other courses of the Federal Office for Civil Protection. This is for instance the case in courses for commanders of civil defence organisations and advanced courses for situation chiefs. In the military realm future adjutants are trained at battalion level. Then, a cultural property protection sequence also forms part of defence attaché training to raise their awareness for the aspects of the protection of cultural property with regard to international law. Through the revision of the Act on the Protection of Cultural Property the Confederation is also to be granted from 2015 on the option to train personnel in the cultural institutions.

h) Marking

Marking cultural assets with what is known as an emblem for the protection of cultural property (PCP sign) during an armed conflict constitutes a further protective measure. The PCP sign is a protected emblem (like the Red Cross or the Red Crescent of the ICRC) and obliges the attacking party to abstain from any military activity within a circumference of 500 metres of a cultural asset that has been marked in this way. Precisely in the wars in former Yugoslavia this failed to work: On the contrary, buildings marked with the PCP emblem were considered to be particularly valuable and were often attacked first and destroyed (e.g. the Old Bridge in Mostar from the 16th century, the ancient town of Dubrovnik as World Heritage Site etc.). In Switzerland the blue shields could, to date, only be placed on buildings in case of imminent armed conflict and at the request of the Federal Council. Since the new legislation entered into force on 1 January 2015 the cantons also have the option to mark their cultural assets in times of peace according to standard regulations.

i) Information

Both international and national legislation require that the states, the representatives of authorities and the general public are informed on the protection of cultural property. In the past, cultural assets were often destroyed because people were not or too little aware of their importance. Here the Agency for the Protection of Cultural Property is primarily active at the federal level, seeking to remedy this issue with various brochures (see publications below). Furthermore, the Confederation is involved in research projects that internationally should bring added value to the protection of cultural property.

j) Partners

With the acceptance of the Act on Civil Protection and Civil Defence in January 2004 an integral system has become operational in Switzerland that serves to master natural and technological disasters rapidly and at low cost by integrating all relevant forces in a modular fashion. The main objective here is to minimise damage to life and limb or cultural property. The most important partner for the protection of cultural property are – apart from the civil defence and the police – the fire services. Their cooperation has been intensified since 2004. Together with representatives from the Swiss Conference of Fire Brigade Inspectors (SFIK) sequences, documents and strategies have been defined that enable optimum cooperation of cultural property protection and fire services. The cultural property rescue system ('Curesys') integrates cultural assets in the event of damage into fire brigade operations in order to ensure the most conservative salvage of cultural property possible. The military may also become an important partner for the protection of cultural property because troops can be called in for subsidiary operations in the event of natural incidents for example.

== International cooperation ==
International cooperation is primarily coordinated by UNESCO. It has been laid down in the Second Protocol, Art. 24 that an international committee is to be constituted for the protection of cultural property during armed conflicts. This committee convenes annually and is supported by the UNESCO Secretariat (Second Protocol, Art. 28). Every four years, the signatory states report to the committee on the implementation of the Second Protocol. In 2015, with the revision of the Act on the Protection of Cultural Property, the stipulations of the Second Protocol, which Switzerland ratified in 2004, will be integral part of Swiss law. Switzerland has already collaborated bilaterally with various countries, for example with the Czech Republic, Germany and Norway.

== Legal foundations ==
International

- Hague Convention of 14 May 1954 on the Protection of Cultural Property during Armed Conflicts (HAK)
- Protocol to the Convention for the Protection of Cultural Property in the Event of Armed Conflict (1954)
- Second Protocol of 26 March to the Hague Convention of 1954 on the Protection of Cultural Property during Armed Conflicts

National

- Federal Act of 20 June 2014 on the Protection of Cultural Property (KGSG)
- Ordinance of 29 October 2014 on the Protection of Cultural Property during Armed Conflicts (KGSV)
- Ordinance of the DDPS of 05 April 2016 on Security Documentations and Microfilms
- Act of 20 December 2019 on Civil Protection and Civil Defence (CPDA)
- Ordinance of 11 November 2020 on Civil Defence (CDO)

Cross-references

- Federal Act of 20 June 2003 on the International transfer of cultural Property (CPTA)
- Federal Act of 1 July 1966 on the Protection of Nature Cultural Heritage (NCHA)

== Publications ==
- Bundesamt für Bevölkerungsschutz: KGS-Forum. (periodical, No. 1–35). Bern 2001ff.
- Bundesamt für Bevölkerungsschutz: Guidelines. (No. 1–5). Bern 2003ff.
- Bundesamt für Bevölkerungsschutz: Kulturgüterschutz betrifft uns alle. (Internationale Kulturgüterschutztagung Schweiz, 23–25 September 2002). Bern 2003.
- Bundesamt für Bevölkerungsschutz: Bewahren, Sichern, Respektieren. Der Kulturgüterschutz in der Schweiz. (Publication for the 50 years anniversary of the 'Hague Convention of 14 May 1954 on the Protection of Cultural Property during Armed Conflicts'). Bern 2004.
- Bundesamt für Bevölkerungsschutz: Challenges of protecting cultural property. (Publication for the International Conference on the Protection of Cultural Property, Switzerland 30.9. - 2.10.2012). Bern 2014.
- Bundesamt für Bevölkerungsschutz: Expertenbericht: "Erdbeben und Kulturgüter". (Arbeitsgruppe Erdbeben und Kulturgüter des Schweizerischen Komitees für Kulturgüterschutz). Bern 2004.
- Bundesamt für Bevölkerungsschutz: Schutz von Kulturgut bei Hochwasser. Empfehlungen auf Stufe Bund und Kanton. Bern 2010.
- Bundesamt für Bevölkerungsschutz: Mikroklima in Kulturgüterschutzräumen. Bern 2011. (electronic publication)
- Bundesamt für Bevölkerungsschutz: Leitfaden für die Erstellung eines Notfallplans. In collaboration with the University of Basel, Planning and Development Staff. Bern 2012. (electronic publication)
- Bundesamt für Bevölkerungsschutz: Cultural property shelters: construction of new refuges and repurposing of decommissioned protected facilities. Co-authors: Dr. Thomas Wenk and Andrea Giovannini. Bern 2020. (electronic publication.)
- Mylène Devaux: Seismic vulnerability of cultural heritage buildings in Switzerland. Ph.D. EPF Lausanne. Lausanne 2008. (electronic publication)
- Andrea Giovannini: "De Tutela Librorum": La conservation des livres et des documents d'archives / Die Erhaltung von Büchern und Archivalien. 4th revised and considerably extended edition. Baden 2010.
- Kerstin Odendahl: Kulturgüterschutz. Entwicklung, Struktur und Dogmatik eines ebenenübergreifenden Normensystems. Tübingen 2005.
- Jiří Toman: Les biens culturels en temps de guerre: Quel progrès en faveur de leur protection? Commentaire article-par-article du Deuxième Protocole de 1999 relatif à la Convention de la Haye de 1954 pour la protection des biens culturels en cas de conflit armé. Paris 2015.
- UNESCO / Swiss Confederation: Protecting cultural property. International Conference on the 20th anniversary of the1999 Second Protocol of the 1954 Hague Convention. 25–26 April 2019, Geneva. Conference proceedings. Paris 2020. (electronic publication)
- Martin Strebel: Konservierung und Bestandeserhaltung von Schriftgut und Grafik. Ein Leitfaden für Archive, Bibliotheken, Museen, Sammlungen. 3. vollständig neu bearbeitete und erweiterte Auflage. Herausgegeben von der Fachstelle schriftliches Kulturerbe St. Gallen. St. Gallen 2020. (electronic publication)
