= ICDO =

ICDO may refer to:

- International Classification of Diseases for Oncology
- International Civil Defence Organization
