= Cyber-Defence Campus =

Swiss Cyber defence organisation

Agency overview
- Jurisdiction: Federal administration of Switzerland
- Headquarters: Thun, other locations: Zurich, Lausanne
- Parent department: Federal Department of Defence, Civil Protection and Sports

The Cyber Defence Campus (CYD Campus) is a competence centre of the Swiss Confederation for information security (cybersecurity). It is affiliated to the Federal Office of Defence Procurement, armasuisse and thus to the Federal Department of Defence, Civil Protection and Sport (DDPS). It pursues strategic objectives that are defined within the Cyber Defence Action Plan, the DDPS Cyber Strategy and the National Cyber Strategy (NCS). It is the link between the public administration, industry and academia in research, development and training for cyber defence. The aim of the CYD Campus is to identify developments in the cyber area and drive innovation in the field of cyber defence.

== History ==
In 2017, Federal Councillor Guy Parmelin issued a cyber defence action plan in response to a cyber attack on the federally owned defence company RUAG to improve Switzerland's defences against cyber threats. This Action Plan for Cyber Defence (APCD) also included the establishment of the CYD Campus with its mission to anticipate developments in cyberspace, monitor trends and develop the skills and technologies required for cyber defence. The CYD Campus was subsequently founded by armasuisse Science and Technology in January 2019.

== Organisation and tasks ==
Based on the national cyber strategy, the CYD Campus performs four tasks to strengthen Switzerland's cyber defence:

- Early detection of trends in the cyber area
- Research and innovation of cyber technologies
- Training of talents and cyber specialists
- Searching for vulnerabilities

== Collaboration network and locations ==
The CYD Campus maintains a collaboration network with over 60 public and private organisations. These include universities from Switzerland (e.g. ETH Zurich and EPFL) and abroad (e.g. University of Oxford) as well as industrial partners (start-ups, SMEs and established companies). The CYD Campus is represented in three cities (Thun, Zurich and Lausanne) with its own collaboration spaces.

== Strengthening cyber defence in Switzerland ==
The CYD Campus implements various measures to sensibilize the Swiss public to cyber issues and implement the tasks.

=== CYD Campus Conference ===
The CYD Campus aims to bring together business, industry, the armed forces and universities and organises an annual conference for this purpose. Experts from the field of cyber security present security and defence-related cyber topics.

=== Hackathons ===
The Cyber Defence Campus organises hackathons with the aim of promoting the exchange of knowledge in the cyber community. Students, IT experts and members of the Swiss Armed Forces have the opportunity to work on real-time projects and use software and data to identify potential vulnerabilities over the course of a week.

=== Cyber Startup Challenge ===
The CYD Campus monitors and anticipates cyber developments, responding to the increasing cyber risks and looking for forward-looking technologies as part of its Cyber Startup Challenge. The Cyber Defence Campus organises Cyber Startup Challenges with the aim of identifying innovative solutions in the field of cyber security and developing solutions for the Swiss Armed Forces with startups.

=== CYD Fellowships ===
The CYD Fellowship Programme is a talent programme in the field of cyber security research. The CYD Campus launched the Fellowship Programme in 2020 together with EPFL Lausanne. Master's and PhD students as well as postdocs have the opportunity to write a thesis on cyber topics with the support of experts from the CYD Campus and professors from Swiss universities.
