= Law enforcement in Switzerland =

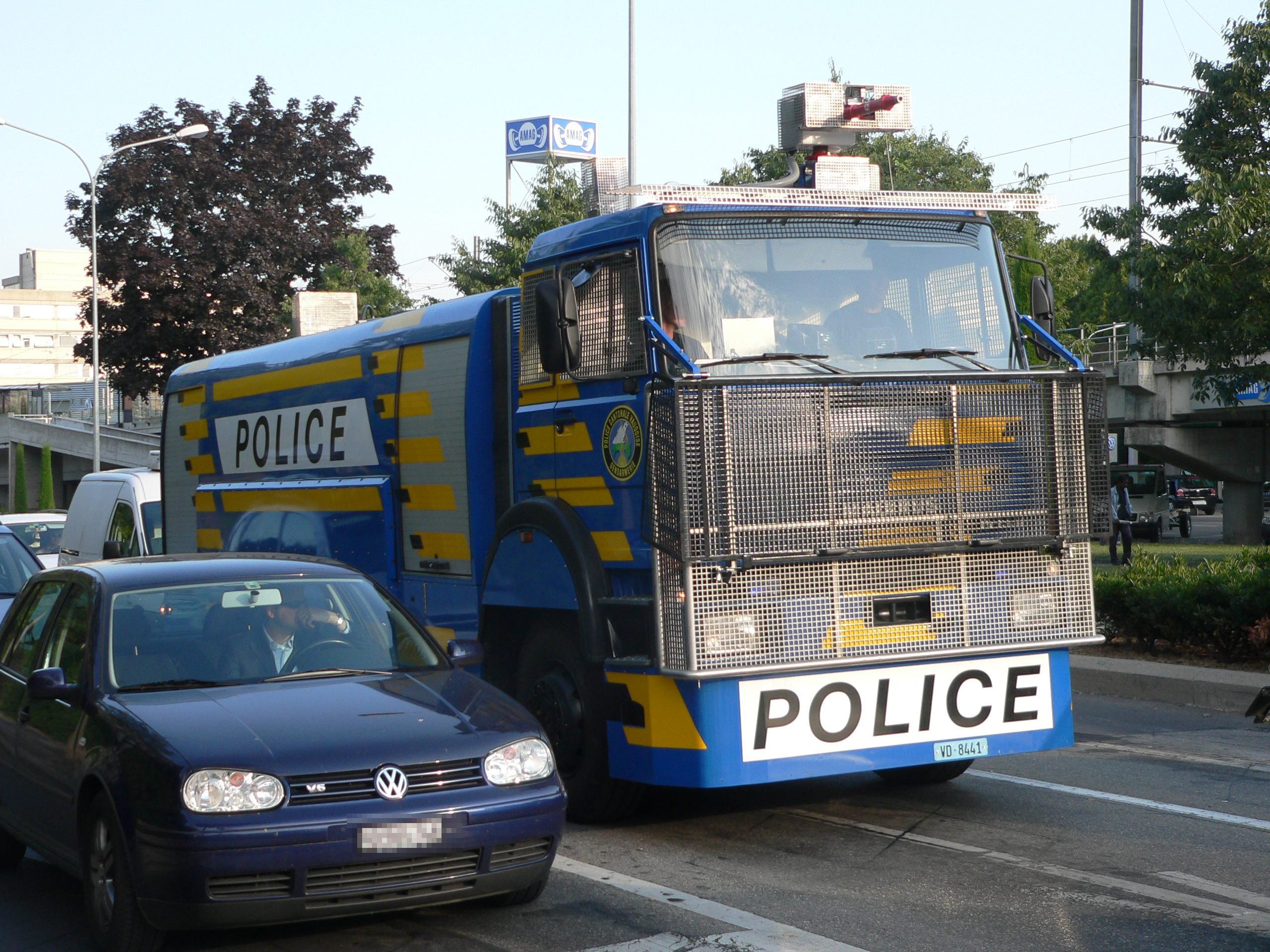
Water cannon in Lausanne

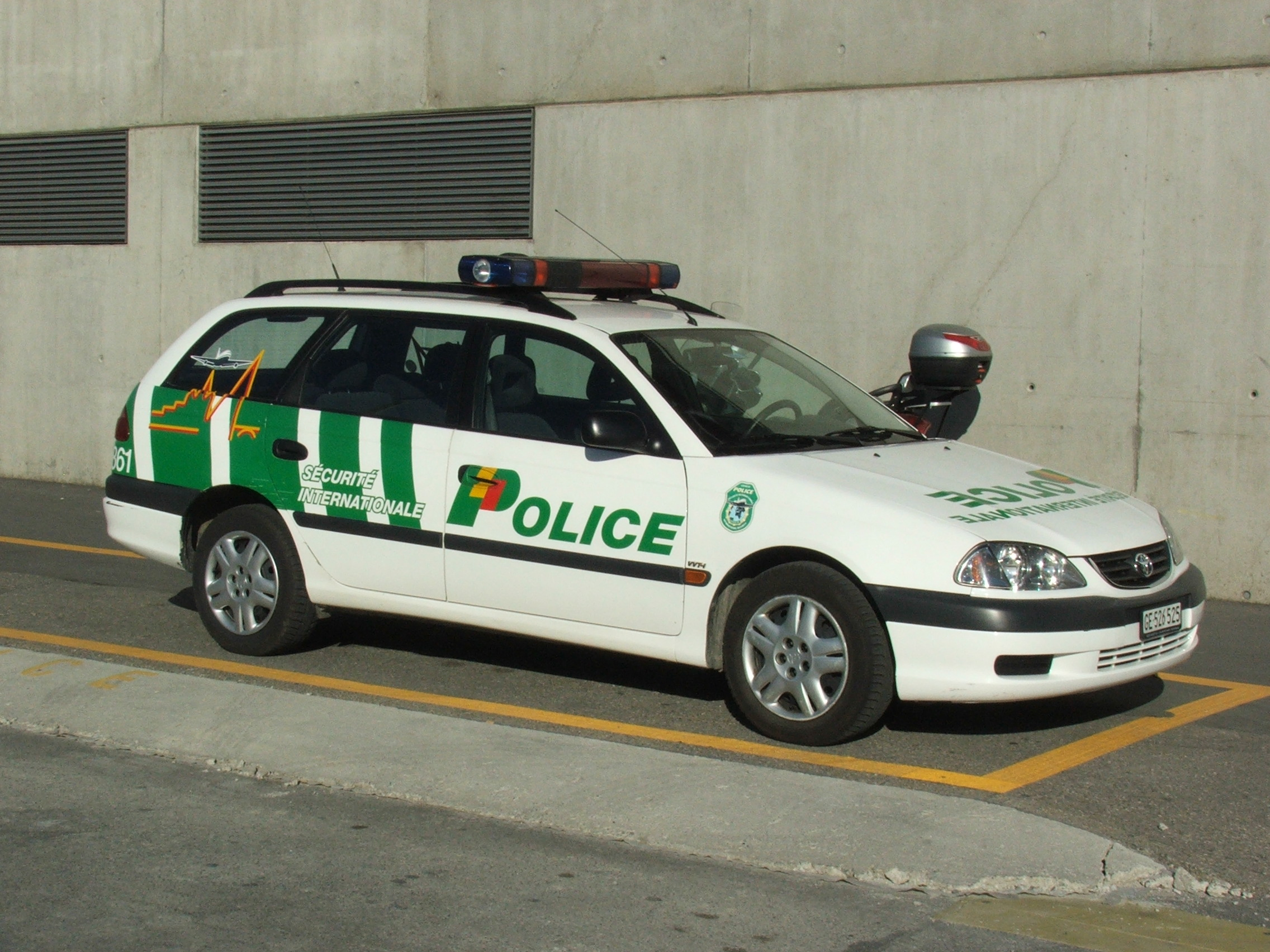
Toyota Avensis of the airport section of the Cantonal police of Geneva

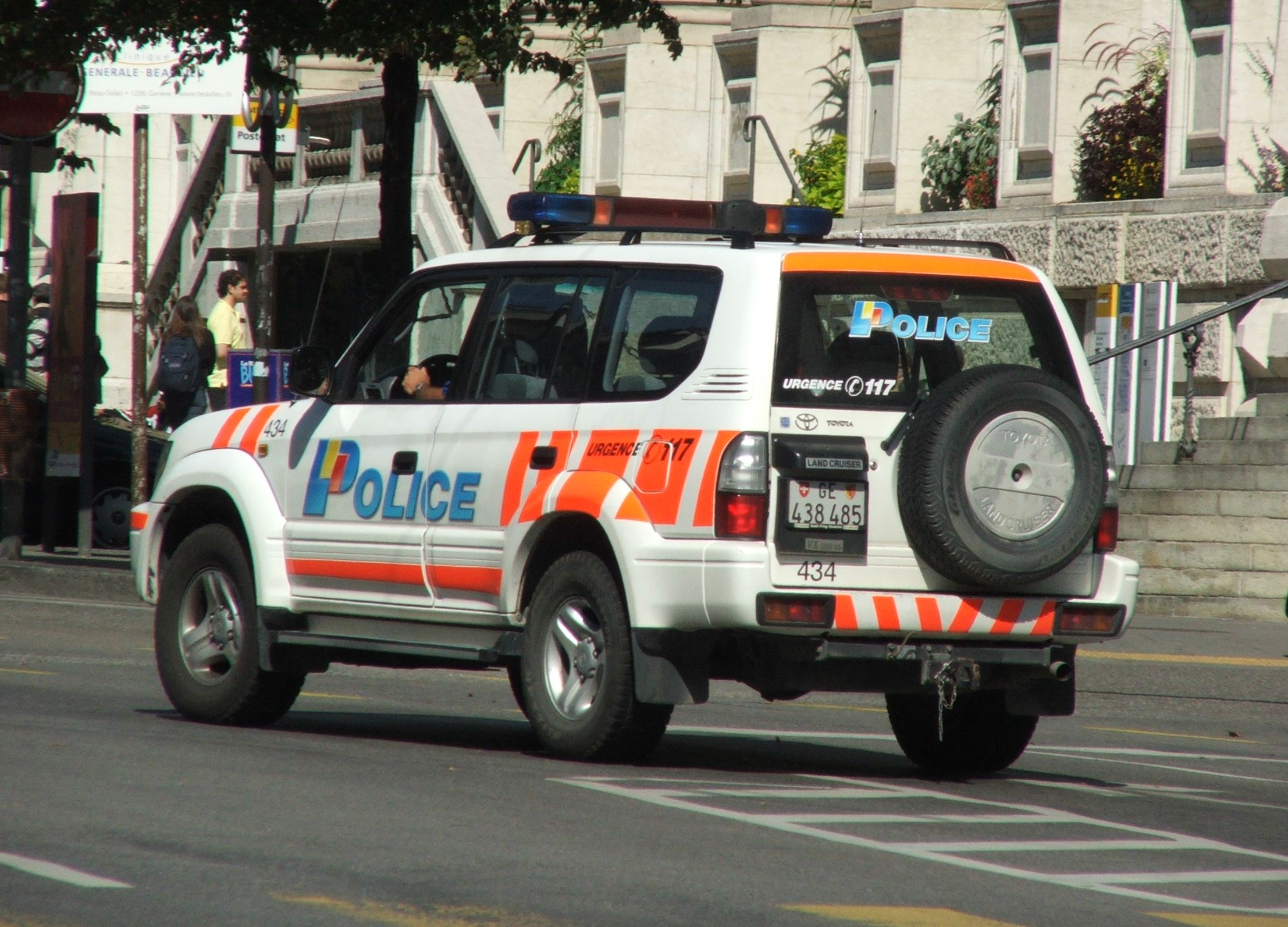
Toyota Land Cruiser of the Cantonal police of Geneva

Law enforcement in Switzerland is mainly a responsibility of the 26 cantons of Switzerland, who each operate cantonal police agencies. Some cities also operate municipal police agencies as provided for by cantonal law. With 214 police persons per 100000 Switzerland is slightly below the European average of 300.

The federal government provides specialised services and is responsible for the protection of the Swiss border. Throughout Switzerland, the police may be reached by the emergency telephone number 1-1-7.

== Requirements ==
The requirements to be an officer in Switzerland vary by canton, whose responsibility it is to institute the police service.

Typical requirements include a complete high school education or 3 year vocational education, aged approximately 20–30 years of age, absence of a criminal record, completion of military service, a minimum height requirement, a Category B driver's licence, computer and keyboard literacy, foreign language skills, proper health and ocular health status, and Swiss citizenship.

== Law enforcement agencies ==
=== Federal ===
The federal government does not run a general purpose law enforcement agency. National-level law enforcement coordination is provided by a board of cantonal police commanders.

==== Federal Office of Police ====
The Federal Office of Police, an organisation belonging to the Federal Department of Justice and Police, coordinates international operations and may request cantonal police support for criminal investigations conducted under federal jurisdiction (such as with respect to organised crime, money laundering and terrorism).

==== Federal Office for Customs and Border Security ====
The Federal Office for Customs and Border Security is responsible for Swiss border security.

==== Military of Switzerland ====
The military of Switzerland, led by the Federal Department of Defence, Civil Protection and Sports, operates a professional military security service and a military police service.

These services, as well as the armed forces in general, can be tasked to support the cantonal police forces in situations where civilian police resources are insufficient, such as catastrophes or large-scale unrest. In this case, the military serves under cantonal civilian responsibility and command.

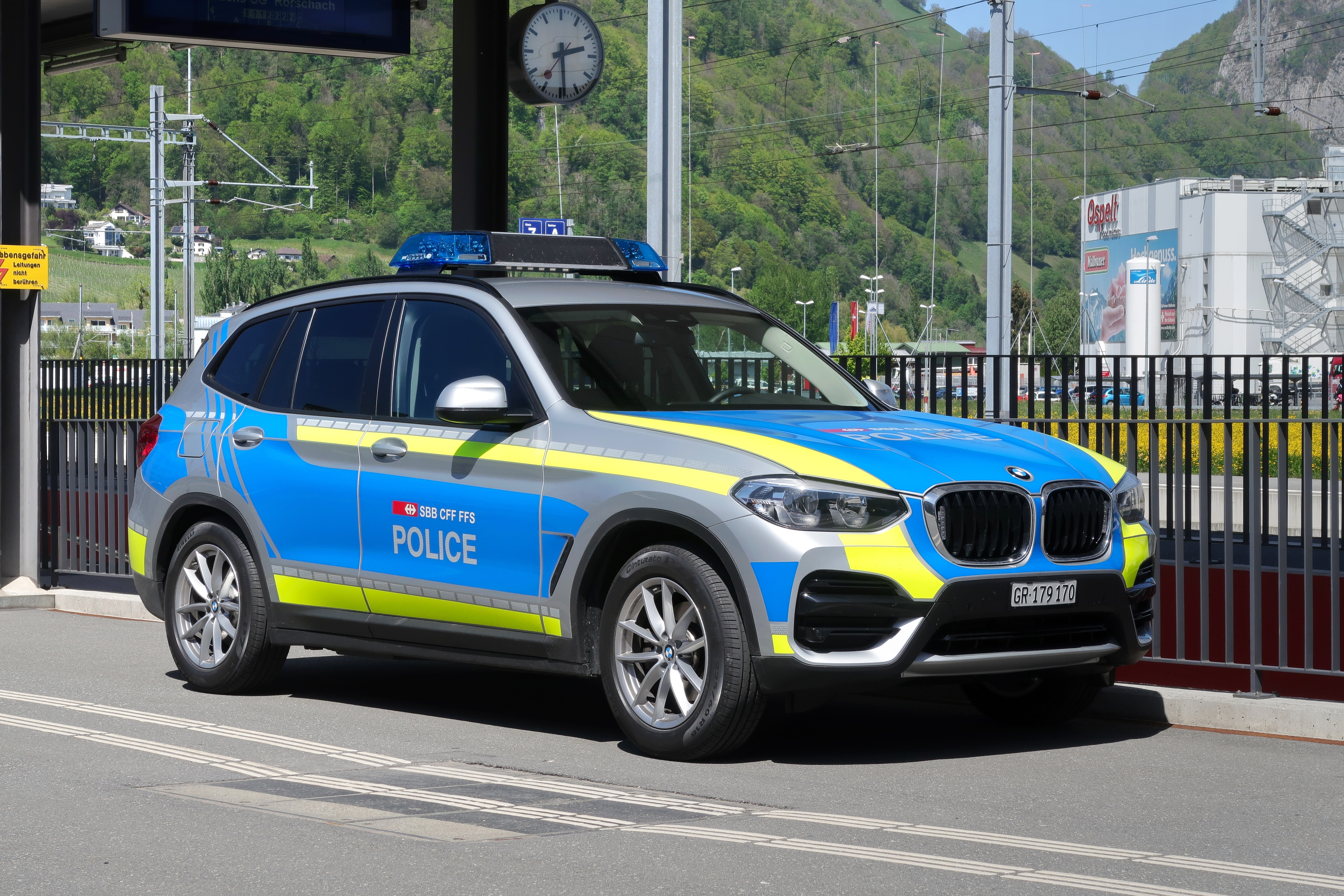
Swiss Railway Police.

=== Cantonal ===
The 26 cantonal police agencies and numerous municipal police agencies are the backbone of Swiss law enforcement. They are not subordinate to federal authorities.

Their commanding officers report to the head of the respective cantonal or municipal department of police, who is a member of the cantonal or municipal governing council.

Police training is conducted in cantonal service academies and at the Interkantonale Polizeischule Hitzkirch, a joint police academy of twelve police agencies established in 2007.

=== Private ===
Several private security services such as Securitas AG and Protectas exist in Switzerland.

Their agents (except those of the railway police service as noted) do not have any law enforcement authority, such as the power of arrest, beyond that of ordinary citizens.

==== Railway Police ====
An actual Swiss Railway Police did not exist until the late 1990s. Prior to this, a number of train attendants were sworn in, equipped with a sidearm and ordered to provide security services in addition to their main duties.

In the early 1990s, internal employees were recruited into a security force called Bahnpolizei (Bapo) or Railway Police, responsible for the safety on the S-Bahn, the public suburban railway network in Zurich.

Its officers were equipped with a baton and a pepper spray but were not allowed to carry a firearm and had very limited authority.

Later the Swiss Federal Railways SBB and security company Securitas AG established the Public Transport Security Services Securitrans AG, where the Bapo was subsequently embedded in.

With the passage of the Federal Act on the Security Units of Public Transport Companies in 2010, the Railway Police returned under SBB’s umbrella and was renamed to Transport Police for legal reasons.

In 2012, the Ordinance on the Security Units of Public Transport Companies was issued that extended the Transport Police's authority and allowed its officers to carry a sidearm.

Today, the Transport Police and Securitrans coexist with different fields of duty.

== Prisons ==
Switzerland has 124 detention facilities with a total capacity of up to 6,736 detainees, all operated by the Swiss cantons.

The smallest prison is the Untersuchungsgefängnis Trogen with a capacity of two detainees.

== See also ==
- Crime in Switzerland
- Civil protection in Switzerland
- Military of Switzerland
