= Swiss Seismological Service =

Swiss federal agency

- (in German) Schweizerischer Erdbebendienst (in French) Service sismologique suisse (in Italian) Servizio sismico svizzero (in Romansh) Servizi da terratrembels svizzer
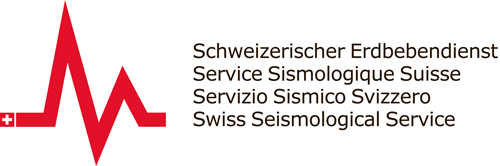

Agency overview
- Headquarters: Zurich, Switzerland
- Employees: About 70
- Agency executive: Prof. Stefan Wiemer, Director
- Website: www.seismo.ethz.ch

The Swiss Seismological Service (Note: German: Schweizerischer Erdbebendienst, French: Service sismologique suisse, Italian: Servizio sismico svizzero, Romansh: Servizi da terratrembels svizzer) at ETH Zurich is the federal agency responsible for monitoring earthquakes in Switzerland and its neighboring countries and for assessing Switzerland's seismic hazard. When an earthquake happens, the SED informs the public, authorities, and the media about the earthquake's location, magnitude, and possible consequences. The activities of the SED are integrated in the federal action plan for earthquake precaution.

== History ==
The beginnings of the SED trace back to the establishment of the Erdbebenkommission in 1878. In 1911, the first earthquake surveillance station of Switzerland was established in Degenried near Zurich. Three years later (1914), the earthquake monitoring mandate was defined in a federal law. Thus, what had been a voluntary activity was transformed into an institution. 1957 the federal assembly agrees on a federal law which puts the SED under the wing of the ETH Zurich (Institute of Geophysics). In its present form as a nondepartmental unit of ETH Zurich, the SED has been in existence since 2009.

== Earthquake monitoring ==
More than 200 seismic monitoring stations installed and serviced by the SED constantly monitor earthquake activity in Switzerland and its neighboring countries. All stations operate high-dynamic-range sensors with wide frequency bandwidths and are digitised on modern 24- or 26-bit data loggers, which stream data in real time, targeting minimum latency. Any data that arrives in Zurich are managed and processed by SED. By assessing its quality, SED ensures that the data are ready to use to produce an Earthquake Catalogue and in downstream research. The processing center in Zurich acquires data recorded in Switzerland from two different sources:

- Swiss National Network (CHNet) consisting of both the Swiss Digital Seismic Network (SDSNet) and the Swiss Strong Motion Network (SSMNet), mainly using broadband seismometers to register weak local, moderate regional and moderate to strong global earthquakes as well as accelerometers to register moderate and strong local earthquakes.
- Special networks (often temporary) in order to monitor increased natural seismic activity, do aftershock deployments, monitor geothermal exploration, support research and educational projects (e.g. AlpArray and seismo@school), or industry projects by third-party assignment.

Although the main focus lies on Switzerland, SED also develops techniques that can be applied elsewhere and teaming up with agencies around the world to develop, install and monitor systems. Furthermore, SED is working closely together with other seismological services in immediate neighboring countries.

== Earthquake hazard in Switzerland ==
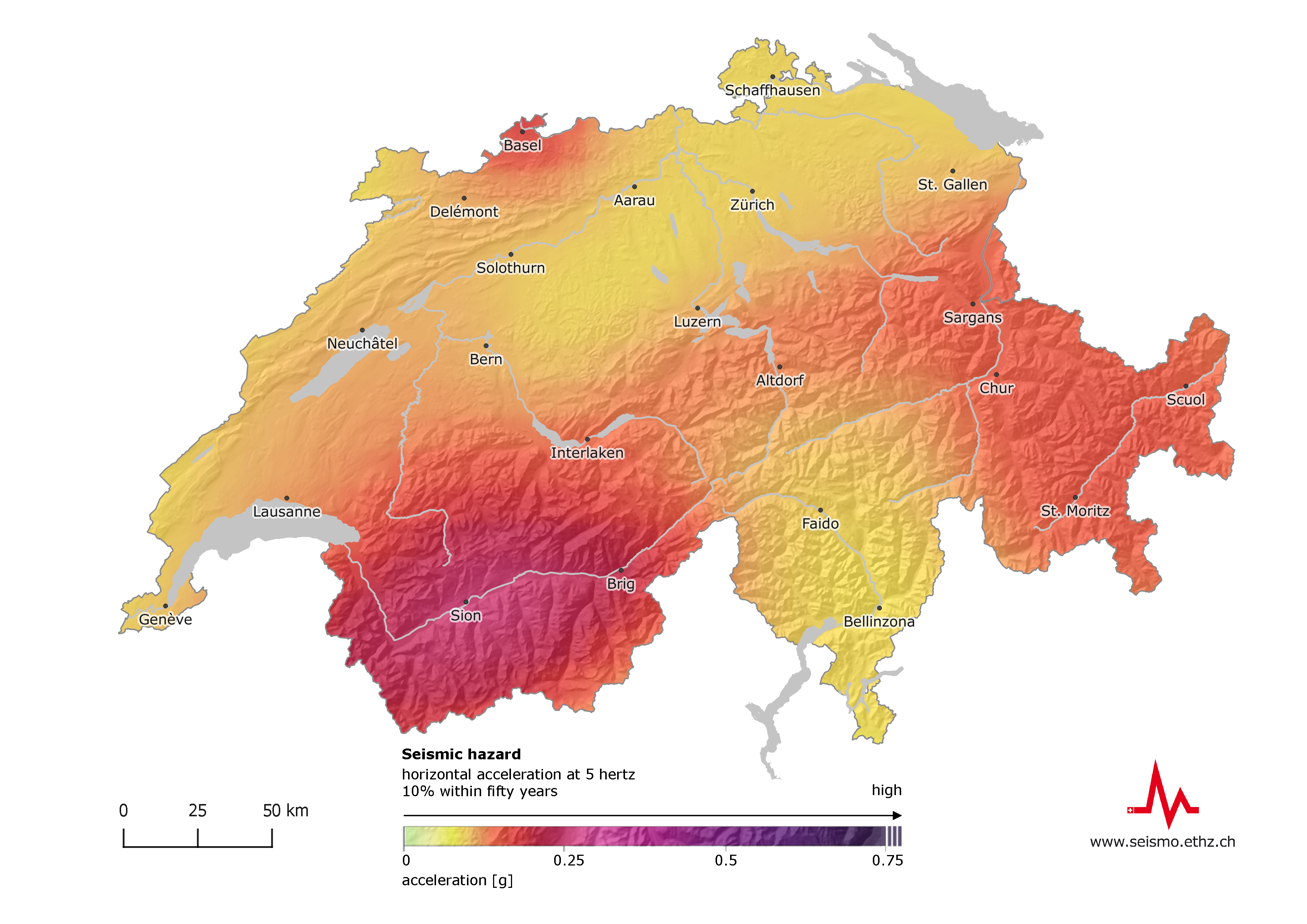
Seismic Hazard Map, Switzerland

In comparison with other European countries Switzerland faces a medium seismic hazard, but there are regional differences: In Valais, Basel, the St. Gallen Rhine Valley, Mittelbünden, the Engadine, and Central Switzerland more earthquakes are registered than in other regions. However, earthquakes may occur anytime and anywhere in Switzerland. Between 1’000 and 1’500 earthquakes a year are recorded in Switzerland and its immediate neighboring countries. Actually, between 10 and 20 quakes a year are strong enough to be felt by citizens, usually those with a magnitude of 2.5 or above.

A strong earthquake with a magnitude of approximately 6 occurs every 50 to 100 years on average. The last time an earthquake of such magnitude was recorded was in 1946 near Sierre in Valais.
The strongest earthquake in Switzerland so far had a magnitude of approximately 6.6 and destroyed large parts of the city of Basel in 1356. If such an earthquake were to occur in Basel today, several thousand fatalities, tens of thousands of seriously and slightly injured people, and property damage on the order of approximately CHF 140 billion could be expected.

The best protection measures against the effects of an earthquake are an earthquake-resistant building design and securing objects that may topple. 90 percent of the buildings in Switzerland are not built to a seismic code, and it is not clear to what extent they could withstand a strong earthquake. Only few cantons have statutory regulations requiring adherence to construction standards for earthquake-resistant building.

== Alert in case of an earthquake ==
Earthquakes can neither be predicted nor prevented. However, the SED records the ground tremors around the clock. Within approximately 90 seconds details about the time, location, magnitude, and possible effects of an earthquake are displayed on the website www.seismo.ethz.ch. The SED automatically reports any noticeable earthquakes to the authorities and the media. At the same time, this information is transmitted to the SED's 24-hour on-call service via pager, e-mail, and SMS. This service is also available to the authorities and the media for further information about current earthquakes, and prepares background information that is published on the website. In case of earthquakes that cause major damage worldwide, the SED additionally informs the Swiss Humanitarian Aid Unit (SHA).

== Research and teaching ==
Besides earthquake monitoring and the assessment of seismic hazard, the researchers of the SED are involved in numerous national and international research projects, which are largely financed by third parties. This guarantees the permanent exchange of information across national borders. Fields in which the SED researchers are involved include, for example, glacial and engineering seismology, static seismology, induced seismic activity, as well as the monitoring of landslides and seismotectonics. The main aim of research conducted at the SED is to gain a clearer understanding of earthquakes and their consequences and thereby contribute towards improving the response to such natural hazards, which pose a threat worldwide. At the same time, SED seeks novel ways of using seismological methods to find out more about fundamental processes that shape the Earth. The training of junior researchers also plays an important role for the SED. This is done with lectures and seminars that are integral parts of the teaching program at ETH, as well as through the supervision of master's and doctoral theses.

== Nuclear-test-ban treaty monitoring ==
In 1996, the UN countries decided to draft an agreement on the ban of nuclear tests. An international monitoring system was established to control the adherence to this agreement. The SED contributes by supplying the authority in charge in Vienna with data recorded by the seismic station in the Davos region, which was constructed for exactly this purpose. For example, the seismic station already recorded the corresponding ground shaking twelve minutes after the nuclear test in North Korea in 2013.

== See also ==
- Federal Office for the Environment
- National Emergency Operations Centre
