= International Civil Defence Organization =

Intergovernmental organization

International Civil Defence Organization (ICDO)
- l'Organisation Internationale de Protection Civile (OIPC)
- Formation: 1931 as "Association des Lieux de Genève"
- Founder: Georges Saint-Paul
- Founded at: Paris, France
- Type: Intergovernmental (IGO)
- Location(s): Geneve, Switzerland
- Secretary General: Arguj Kalantarli
- Website: icdo.org

The International Civil Defence Organization (ICDO) is an intergovernmental organization with the objective to contribute to the development by States of structures ensuring the protection and assistance of population and safeguarding property and the environment from natural or man-made disasters.

These structures are generally known as civil protection, civil defence, civil safety, civil defense corps and are all concerned with the management of emergency situations. The ICDO federates the national structures established by States for this purpose with the aim of favoring cooperation and mutual solidarity between them.

The International Civil Defence Organization was founded in 1931. It has 61 member states, 16 observer states and 23 affiliated members.

== History ==
=== The creation of the Association “Les Lieux de Genève” ===
In 1931, retired Surgeon General Dr. Georges Saint-Paul founded the Association “Les Lieux de Genève” in Paris. It was an association dedicated to the protection of civilians and historic monuments in armed conflict situations. It was a revolutionary idea. Until that time, no one had thought about the collateral damage caused to civilians in armed conflicts. Focusing on the protection of the civilian population was an avant-garde idea. Over time, war would increasingly impact civilian life. Indeed, the International Committee of the Red Cross estimates that as many as 97% of the victims of any armed conflict are civilians.

Frightened by the prospect of future wars and aware of what doctors owe to peace, he campaigned for the Red Cross to cover not only ambulances and hospitals in the future, but also for certain places, demarcated in advance, declared and marked on maps where children, the elderly and women could take refuge from the bombing and gas. Today, these areas are called human corridors.

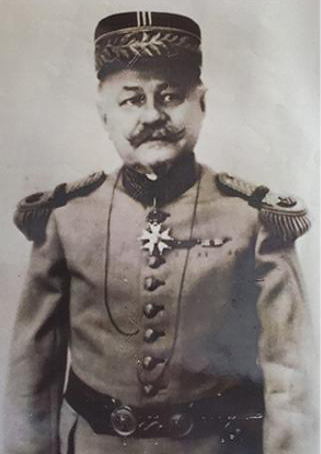
Georges Saint-Paul was a French military doctor and researcher. General practitioner, he is the author of a work that is both literary and scientific

Surgeon-General Georges Saint-Paul who by his generous initiative acquired the right to the title of "benefactor of humanity", unfortunately succumbed on 7 April 1937 to angina pectoris at his château de Rassay in Genillé in Indre-et-Loire France. Despite the death of General Saint-Paul, his friends and loyal collaborators continued to fight for his ideas.

In 1946, the mayor of St. Gallen, Mr. Anderegg, a member of the Swiss Federal Parliament, presented a postulate based on the humanitarian work of Henri Dunant, founder of the Red Cross, and on the actions undertaken at the instigation of the “Les Lieux de Genève”. He asked the Swiss government to examine the problem of the neutralization of cities, areas and regions in the event of war. This was followed by the convening of the Geneva Diplomatic Conference in 1949, where delegates and experts from over 60 countries drew up the new conventions known as the Geneva Conventions of 12 August 1949.

General Saint-Paul's idea found some international legal realization in the Convention relating to the Protection of Civilian Persons in Time of War, the so-called Fourth Geneva Convention.

In 1949, after the signing of the four diplomatic Geneva Conventions, the Lieux de Genève turned their attention to the practical implementation of refuge areas for the protection of non-combatants. It was during this jubilee year, 1951, that Milan Bodi, Deputy Secretary General, was called to succeed Henri George, who died on 6 May 1951, after a short illness, at the age of 77. Mr. Bodi was Secretary General of ICDO from 1951 to 1986. The new Secretary General took over the leadership of the Association in the middle of the Korean War, a war which, just a few months later, highlighted the limits of the implementation of the International Agreements. And this marks the beginning of the second phase of the activity of the «Lieux de Genève» Association. The aim was to study the practical implementation of the evacuation and the advance planning of the places where the evacuees would be housed. In 1951, the Municipality of Lausanne in Switzerland welcomed this practical action and, in collaboration with the Permanent Secretariat of the “Lieux de Genève”, drew up detailed plans for the Organization and construction of a place of refuge for the population of Lausanne. In addition, the Permanent Secretariat continued its work on the Organization of local civil protection services, industrial protection and, among other things, it adapted, in French, a brochure published by the American civil protection administration on protection against atomic weapons.

To this end, an international conference was held in Berlin in 1954 on “The Problem of Protecting Civilian Populations in Time of War through the Creation and Recognition of Neutralized Zones and Open Cities”. This meeting was later to be known in the ICDO chronology as the 1st World Conference on Civil Defence. Following the resolutions adopted by the Berlin congressmen, the International Association proceeded to make many countries aware of the principle of preparing places of refuge in collaboration with national civil protection institutions.

In July 1956, the “Bulletin d'information des Lieux de Genève“ was entitled PROTECTION CIVILE and its editorial heralded the transformation of the Association with the development of national civil Defence Organizations in the various countries.

Following this, the Association des Lieux de Genève profoundly modified its structure at the General Assembly of 10 January 1958, by creating a true International Committee, thus renouncing its title whose local consonance often led to confusion. In the same vein, it extended its tasks beyond the evacuation of civilians to include all protective measures and provided for the involvement of national civil protection bodies, which would be granted rights and duties.

=== Transition from a Non-Governmental Organization to an International Organization (1958-1972) ===
In 1966, in Monaco, following the 2nd International Symposium on Radiological Protection, the representatives of the ICDO Member States, meeting in a Constituent Assembly, adopted the text of the present Constitution which gives it the status of an Intergovernmental Organization under the same name. This Constitution is in fact an international Convention binding on the High Contracting Parties and subsequently on each country which, by depositing its instruments of ratification, has acceded to it as a Member State. Subsequently, the Constitution was registered in 1975 at the United Nations Secretariat in New York in accordance with Article 102 of the Charter and published in the United Nations Treaty Series.

The preamble to the Constitution defines the aims of the Organization and reads as follows: “To intensify and co-ordinate worldwide the development and improvement of the Organization, methods and technical means of preventing and mitigating the consequences of natural disasters in times of peace, or of the use of weapons in times of conflict.” The Constitution effectively came into force on 1 March 1972 at the first General Assembly of its Member States. Subsequently, the ICDO Constitution was registered in 1975 at the United Nations Secretariat in New York in accordance with Article 102 of the Charter and published in the United Nations Treaty Series. Finally, the Agreement signed on 10 March 1976 between the Swiss Federal Council and the ICDO regulated the legal status of the Organization in Switzerland.

In Article 52 the text stipulates that the new Constitution would enter into force when 10 States had become parties to it. So it was not until 1972, at the Organization's first General Assembly held in Geneva from 1 to 3 March, that it entered into force with the filing of instruments of ratification or accession by the following 22 countries: Argentina, Chad, Chile, Colombia, Costa Rica, Côte d'Ivoire, Democratic Republic of Congo, Finland, India, Indonesia, Iran, Liberia, Monaco, Peru, Philippines, Republic of Korea, Syria, Thailand, United Arab Republic, Vietnam, Yugoslavia.

In parallel with the legal and statutory development of the Organization and its contribution to the formulation of the new Humanitarian Law, its leaders worked tirelessly to promote techniques and knowledge in prevention, preparedness and response. As part of the promotion of techniques and knowledge, ICDO organized numerous conferences, exhibitions and seminars which have made it a platform for exchange where civil protection professionals from both industrialized and developing countries share knowledge and experience.

At this point, if we summarize the evolution that had taken place over the first 50 years between General Saint-Paul's "Lieux de Genève" and today's International Civil Defence Organization, we can see that the notion of protection of civilians in times of war has been extended to the protection and security of populations in general, thanks to the intensification, coordination and planning, at an international level, of the methods, means and technologies for preventing, combating and alleviating the consequences of all kinds of accidents, disasters and calamities.

=== International Civil Defence Organization from 1972 to today ===
Although the Organization has evolved since 1937 in Geneva, a Headquarters Agreement between the Swiss Federal Council and the International Civil Defence Organization, concluded on 10 March 1976 and entered into force on 16 March 1976, regulates its legal status, thus confirming its establishment in Geneva, Switzerland.

In the early years, the offices of the International Committee of the Lieux de Genève were located at 10 avenue Blanc and then moved to the Château Banquet, rue de Lausanne, when the latter was rented in 1939. It is a place with lots of history. Built in 1650, the castle was called Château Rozet. In 1712, the castle was bought by Etienne Banquet, and became Château Banquet. The Château, close to the Palais des Nations, where the LoN was based, was an ideal location for the Association, close to the diplomatic missions based in Geneva at the time. Since 1976, ICDO has established its offices in the Parc Chuit, at 10-12, Chemin de Surville in Petit-Lancy. In order to achieve its objectives, this Organization has put in place a strategy and a mechanism that is consistent on three levels, namely structural, operational and functional.

== Organization ==
STRUCTURE ICDO

General Assembly
— Supreme organ —

Executive Council
— Executive organ —

Permanent Secretariat
— Administrative organ —
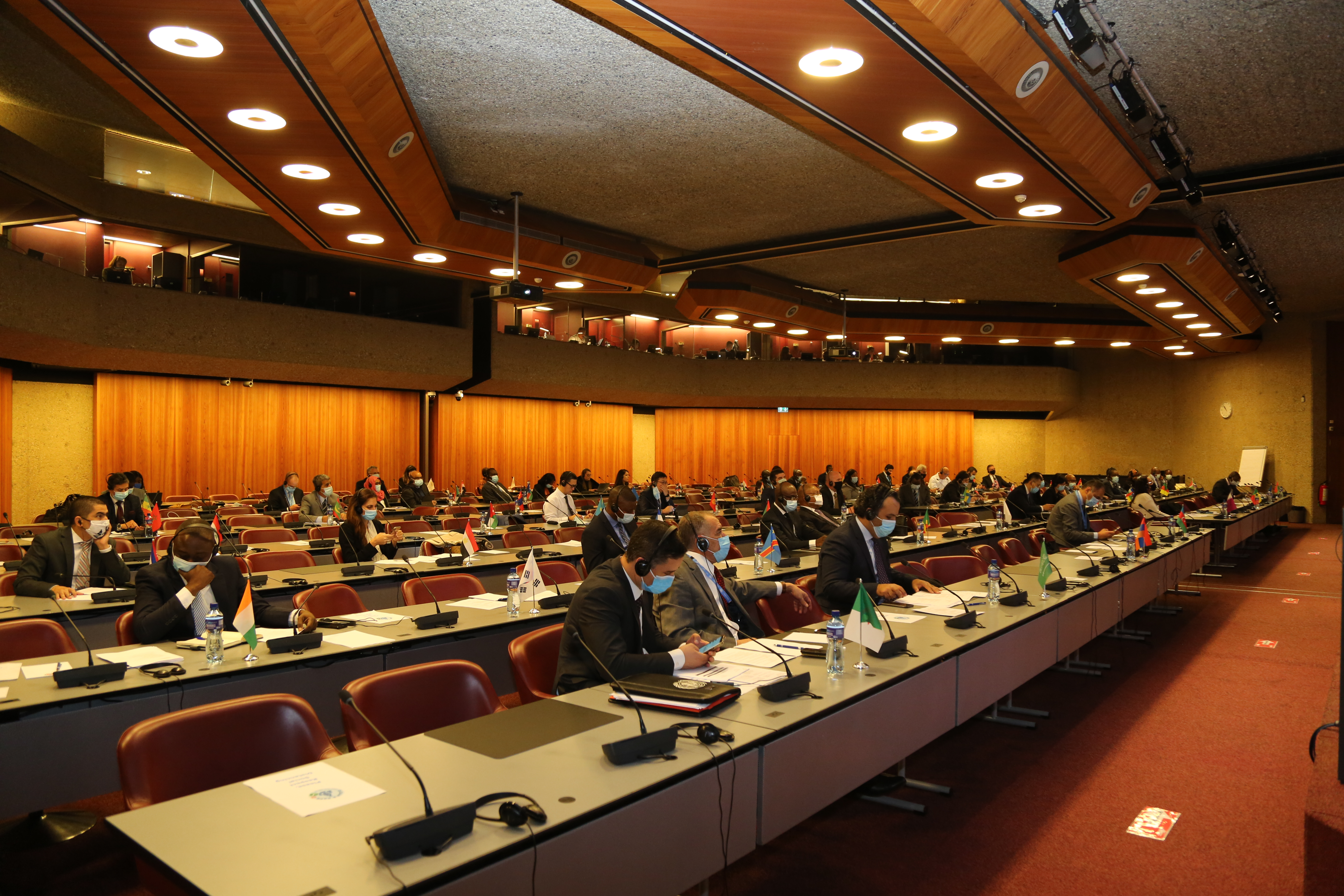
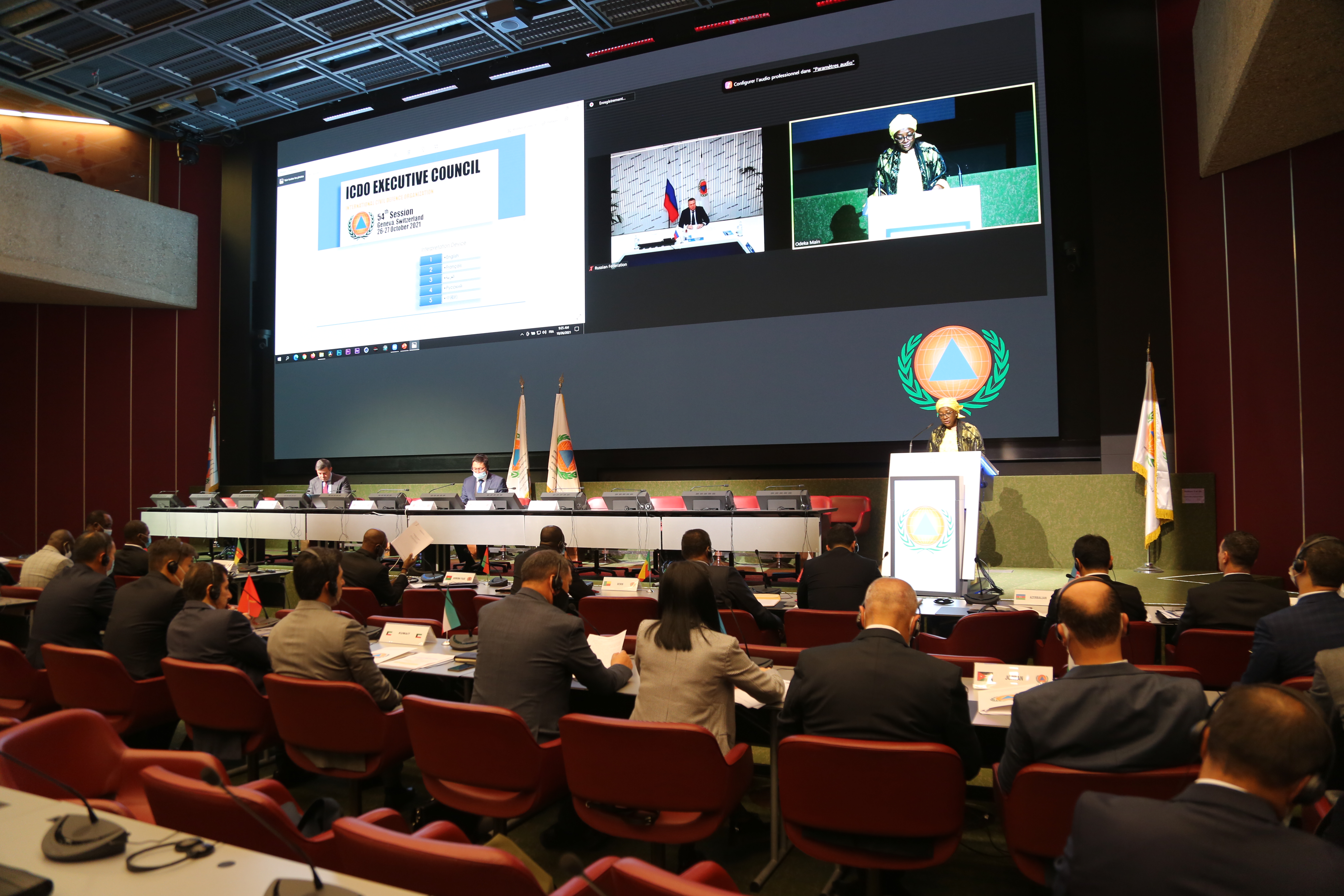
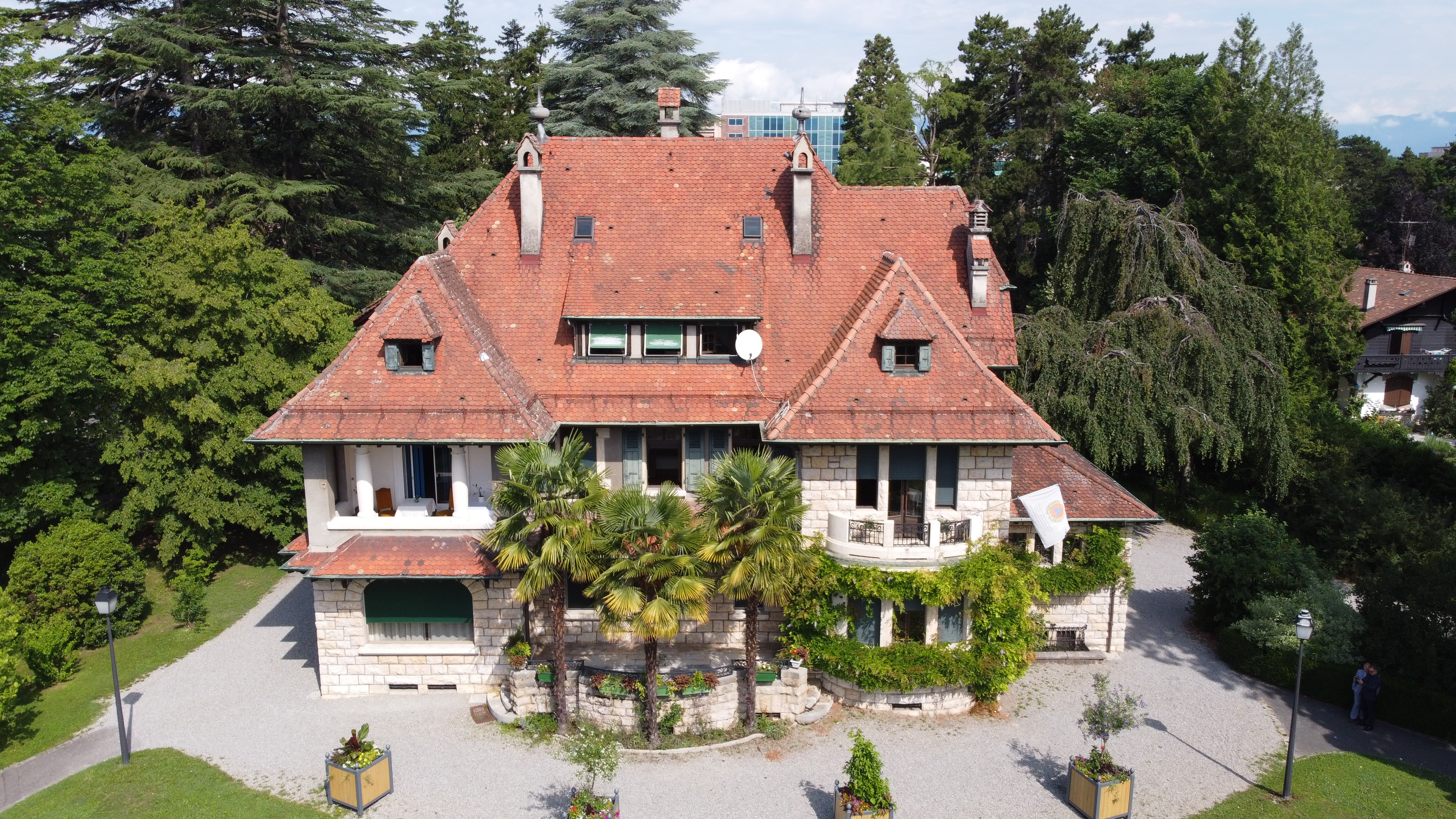

The General Assembly is the supreme body; it comprises 61 Member States, 16 Observers and 23 Affiliate Members and is headed by a President. It meets at least every 2 years.

The Executive Council, the secular arm of the Organization, is currently made up of 25 members whose mandate is renewable every four years. It is overseen by a president. It meets every year in ordinary sessions and as many times as necessary in extraordinary sessions.

The Permanent Secretariat, based in Geneva, Switzerland, is the backbone of the Organization. Indeed, headed by a Secretary General, this body is responsible for the implementation of the decisions of the General Assembly and the Executive Council.

=== Members ===
| Num | Country | Num | Country |
|---|---|---|---|
| 1 | Algeria | 2 | Armenia |
| 3 | Azerbaijan | 4 | Belarus |
| 5 | Bahrain | 6 | Benin |
| 7 | Bosnia and Herzegovina | 8 | Burkina Faso |
| 9 | Burundi | 10 | Cameroon |
| 11 | Central African Republic | 12 | Chad |
| 13 | China | 14 | Republic of the Congo |
| 15 | Democratic Republic of the Congo | 16 | Ivory Coast |
| 17 | Cuba | 18 | Cyprus |
| 19 | Egypt | 20 | El Salvador |
| 21 | Gabon | 22 | Georgia |
| 23 | Ghana | 24 | Guinea |
| 25 | Guinea-Bissau | 26 | Haiti |
| 27 | Iraq | 28 | Jordan |
| 29 | Kazakhstan | 30 | Kuwait |
| 31 | Kyrgyzstan | 32 | Lebanon |
| 33 | Lesotho | 34 | Liberia |
| 35 | Libya | 36 | Malaysia |
| 37 | Mali | 38 | Mauritania |
| 39 | Mongolia | 40 | Morocco |
| 41 | Nicaragua | 42 | Niger |
| 43 | Nigeria | 44 | Oman |
| 45 | Pakistan | 46 | Palestine |
| 47 | Qatar | 48 | Russia |
| 49 | Saudi Arabia | 50 | Senegal |
| 51 | Serbia | 52 | South Korea |
| 53 | South Sudan | 54 | Sudan |
| 55 | Syria | 56 | Tajikistan |
| 57 | Togo | 58 | Tunisia |
| 59 | United Arab Emirates | 60 | Vanuatu |
| 61 | Yemen | | |

== Objectives ==
The International Civil Defence Organization (ICDO) is an intergovernmental Organization whose objective is to contribute to the development by States of structures ensuring the protection and assistance of the population and the safeguarding of property and the environment against natural or man-made disasters, protection of the critical national assets and infrastructure.

=== Humanitarian assistance ===
Strategic partners participating in ICDO activities can provide humanitarian assistance to countries in need.
