= Federal Office for Civil Protection =

Swiss government agency

- (in German) Bundesamt für Bevölkerungsschutz (in French) Office fédéral de la protection de la population (in Italian) Ufficio federale della sicurezza alimentare e di veterinaria

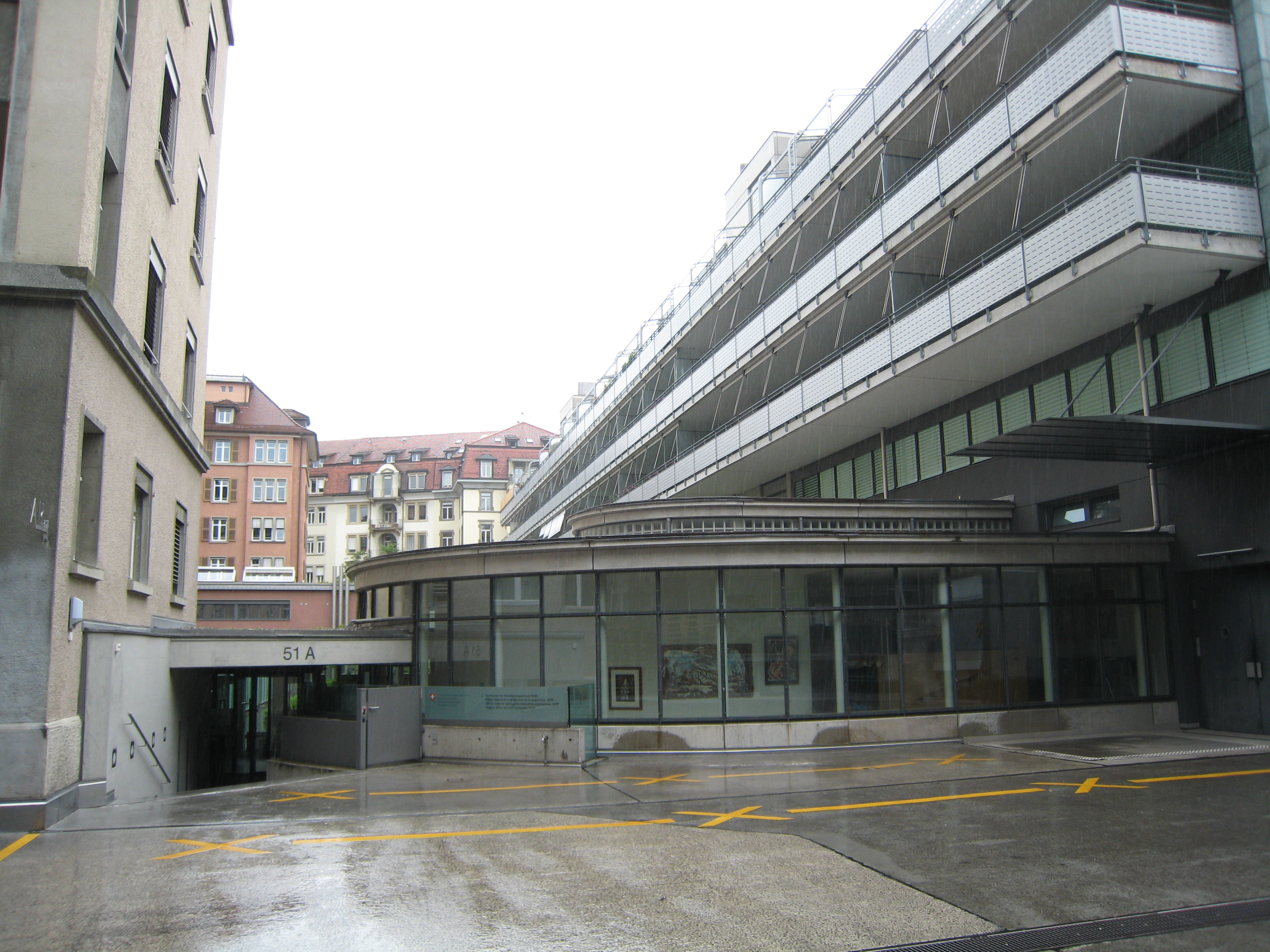

Agency overview
- Jurisdiction: Federal administration of Switzerland
- Headquarters: Bern
- Employees: 324
- Minister responsible: Viola Amherd, Federal Councillor
- Parent agency: Federal Department of Defence, Civil Protection and Sport
- Website: babs.admin.ch

The Federal Office for Civil Protection (FOCP) (Note: German: Bundesamt für Bevölkerungsschutz, BABS, French: Office fédéral de la protection de la population, OFPP, Italian: Ufficio federale della protezione della popolazione, UFPP) is the federal office responsible for the civil defense services of the Swiss cantons and municipalities. It is subordinated to the Federal Department of Defence, Civil Protection and Sport.

== Tasks ==
The role of the Federal Office for Civil Protection is to ensure the co-ordination of leadership, protection, rescue and assistance in co-operation with the five pillars of civil protection, i.e. the police, the fire brigade, civil protection, technical services (water, electricity, communication) and public health services in the event of a disaster, emergency or armed conflict.

The FOCP consists of six business units, including:

- Spiez Laboratory (the national institute for protection against atomic, biological and chemical threats and risks)
- National Emergency Operations Centre: responsible for warning the population in the event of an emergency

== Full-time positions since 2007 ==
Raw data

Source: "Federal Finance Administration FFA: Data portal".
