= National Emergency Operations Centre =

Government agency in Switzerland

- (in German) Nationale Alarmzentrale (in French) Centrale nationale d'alarme (in Italian) Centrale nazionale d'allarme (in Romansh) Centrala naziunala d'alarm

Agency overview
- Jurisdiction: Federal administration of Switzerland
- Minister responsible: Viola Amherd, Federal Councillor
- Parent agency: Federal Department of Defence, Civil Protection and Sports
- Website: www.naz.ch

The National Emergency Operations Centre (NEOC) (German: Nationale Alarmzentrale, French: Centrale nationale d'alarme, Italian: Centrale nazionale d'allarme) is a government organisation of the Swiss Confederation based in Zurich.

The NEOC deals with exceptional events, particularly those involving increases in radioactivity. The NEOC is also manages incidents involving large-scale chemical accidents, as well as overflows or ruptures of dams (the majority of electrical energy in Switzerland is produced as hydroelectricity). The NEOC is responsible for implementing measures to protect the population in emergencies. It is part of the Federal Office for Civil Protection (FOCP) which in turn is a sector of the Federal Department of Defence, Civil Protection and Sports.

== See also ==
- Swiss Seismological Service
