= Spiez Laboratory =

- (in German) Labor Spiez (in French) Laboratoire de Spiez (in Italian) Laboratorio Spiez' (in Romansh) Labor Spiez

Agency overview
- Jurisdiction: Federal administration of Switzerland
- Headquarters: Spiez
- Minister responsible: Viola Amherd, Federal Councillor
- Parent agency: Federal Department of Defence, Civil Protection and Sports
- Website: https://www.spiezlab.admin.ch/de/home.html]

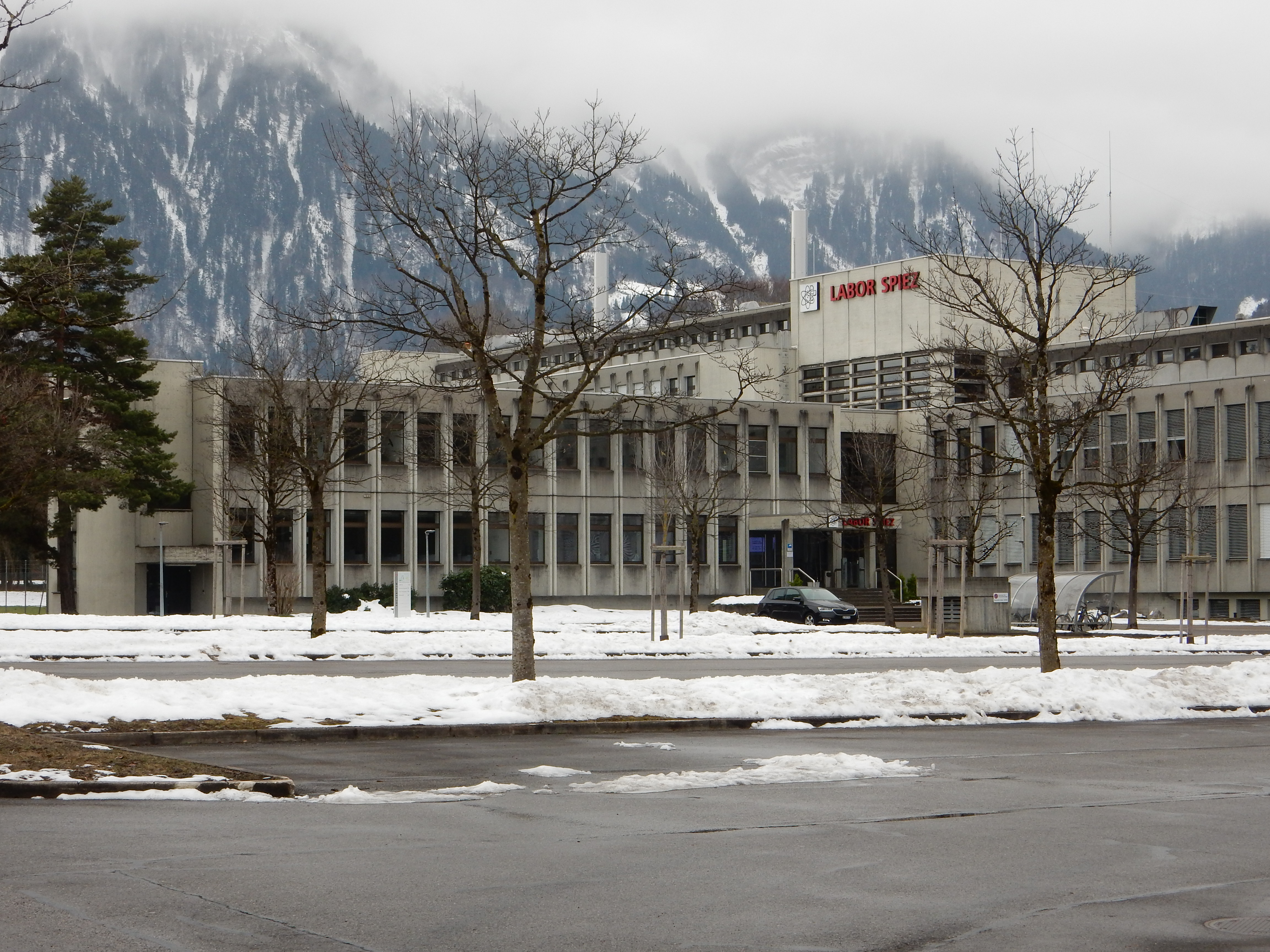
Spiez Laboratory

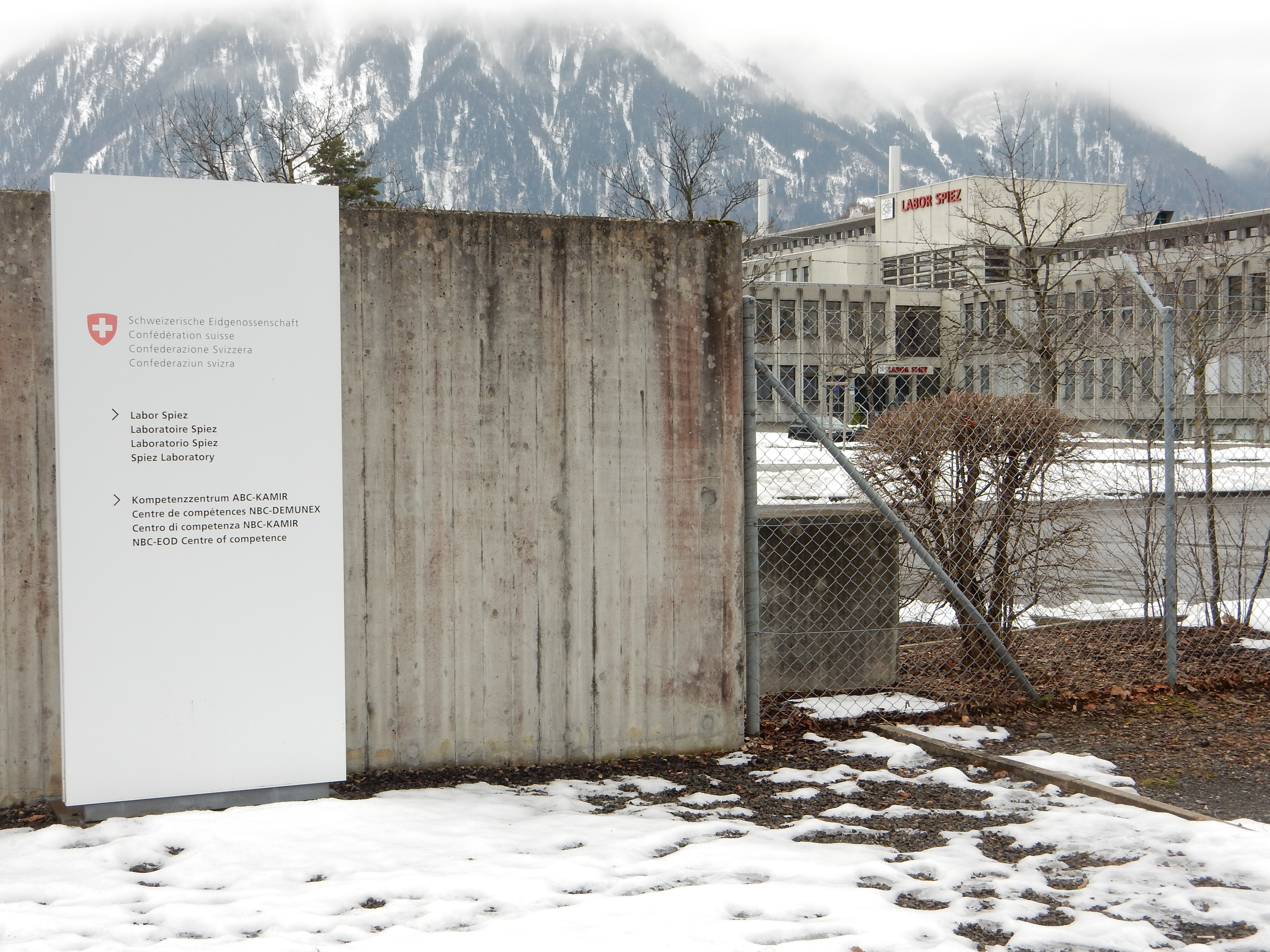
Spiez Laboratory and NBC-EOD Centre of competence

The Spiez Laboratory (German: Labor Spiez, French: Laboratoire de Spiez, Italian: Laboratorio Spiez) is the Swiss institute for the protection of the population against nuclear, biological and chemical threats and dangers. It is part of the Federal Department of Defence, Civil Protection and Sports (DDPS) and is located in Spiez. The Spiez Laboratory is one of the five labs in the world permanently certified by the Organisation for the Prohibition of Chemical Weapons.

== Tasks ==
- NBC Protection

Development of fundamentals of NBC protective materials and coordination of national NBC-protection. Operation of testing laboratories for the authorization and supervision of NBC protective materials.

- Biology

Analysis and diagnosis of biological agents and toxins.

- Chemistry

Analysis of samples of Chemical warfare agents and related compounds (Accredited laboratory of the OPCW). Evaluation of detection and detoxification agents of chemical warfare agents. Production of chemical warfare agents as reference substances.

- Physics

Radioactivity measurements. Environmental testing. Member of the ALMERA network of the IAEA.

- Arms control

Technical advice of the Swiss Confederation with International negotiations on Disarmament and arms control.

== International activities ==
Spiez Laboratory is an internationally recognized center of excellence and works with the United Nations (UN), the Organisation for the Prohibition of Chemical Weapons (OPCW), the United Nations Environment Programme (UNEP), the International Atomic Energy Agency (IAEA) the World Trade Organization (WTO) and the International Committee of the Red Cross (ICRC). Also, Spiez Laboratory provides various posts in the NATO program "Partnership for Peace". It is led by Marc Cadisch and appr. 100 civil employees. It can request at any time personnel and equipment of the NBC Troops of the Swiss Armed Forces, if needed. This includes special hardware like the Mowag DuroIIIP based NBC verification Laboratory, Or Swiss Air Force Eurocopter AS332 Super Puma Helicopters or Northrop F-5 Tiger II for air measurements (e.g. after the Fukushima event).

=== Missions ===
In 2013, Spiez Laboratory was one of the four labs in Europe that analysed samples from the Syrian civil war, for the Organisation for the Prohibition of Chemical Weapons.

=== 2018 Sergei and Yulia Skripal poisoning - Salisbury UK ===
According to Sergey Lavrov, the Russian minister of foreign affairs; Spiez Laboratory detected the presence of BZ (3-Quinuclidinyl benzilate) and its precursor in the substance used in the Sergei and Yulia Skripal poisoning case. However, this assertion was subsequently refuted by the OPCW director-general on 18 April: "We should not have an iota of doubt on the reliability of the system of the OPCW Designated Laboratories. The Labs were able to confirm the identity of the chemical by applying existing, well-established procedures. There was no other chemical that was identified by the Labs. The precursor of BZ that is referred to in the public statements, commonly known as 3Q, was contained in the control sample prepared by the OPCW Lab in accordance with the existing quality control procedures. Otherwise it has nothing to do with the samples collected by the OPCW Team in Salisbury. This chemical was reported back to the OPCW by the two designated labs and the findings are duly reflected in the report."

In September 2018, two reported members of Russia's Main Intelligence Directorate were arrested in The Hague, The Netherlands, for allegedly planning to hack the computer systems of the Spiez Laboratory. The United States Department of Justice has also indicted several alleged GRU operatives on allegations of hacking the Spiez Laboratory.

=== 2021 ===
In 2021, the WHO created a pilot program called BioHub which is serving as a way to get countries to share virus data with one another and combat future outbreaks.

== See also ==
- CBRN defense
- Organisation for the Prohibition of Chemical Weapons
