= Storm Andrea =

Low-pressure area in Europe

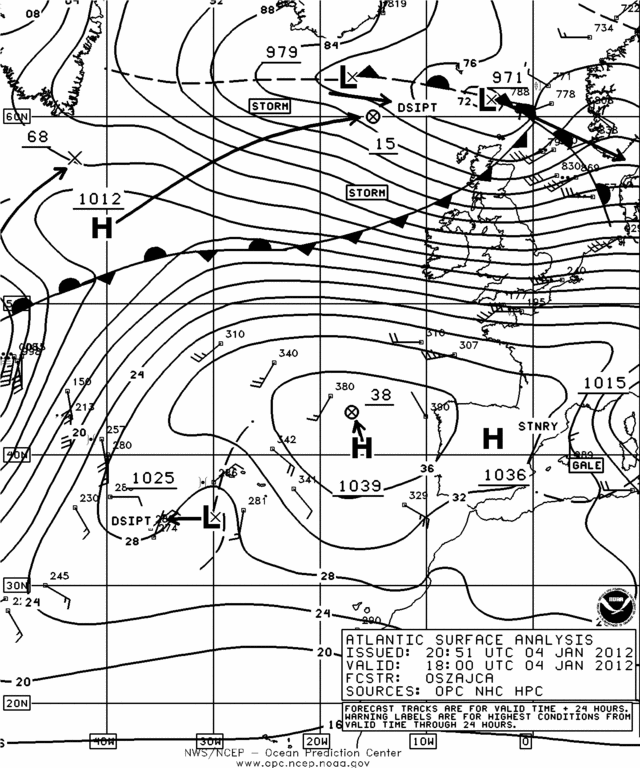
- Meteorological map of 4 January 2012, with Andrea heading towards the North Sea.

Winter synoptic storm
- Lowest pressure: 964 mb (964 hPa)

Overall effects
- Areas affected: Western and Northern Europe

Storm Andrea was an intense depression that swept through Western and Northern Europe in early January 2012. It resulted in one fatality and caused €300 million in damages. The winds damaged buildings and trees, causing power outages. Heavy rains and storm surges led to flooding, while snow trapped numerous villages in the mountains.

== Meteorological evolution ==
Following closely behind Cyclone Ulli, Andrea formed southwest of Iceland on 3 January, already with hurricane-force winds. Meteorological warnings for the UK and northern Europe mentioned winds capable of causing significant damage and torrential rains.

Late on 4 January, the storm passed north of the British Isles, crossing the North Sea, bringing strong winds, particularly to central England, although these winds were less severe than initially forecasted. On 5 January, the storm reached the center of Denmark with a central pressure of 964 hPa before heading towards Poland. It followed a more southerly trajectory than Ulli from the previous week and heavily impacted Germany.

Extratropical cyclones produce the strongest winds in the southeast quadrant, blowing from the southwest sector. The combination of these winds and low pressure causes a storm surge in this quadrant. Following Andrea's path, this surge hit the European coast between Northern France and Germany, causing coastal inundation in low-lying areas.

== Impact ==
=== United Kingdom ===
In the UK, 100,000 homes were left without electricity. The hardest-hit region was southern Scotland, where several weather stations reported record winds, including gusts of 164 km/h (102 mph) in Edinburgh. Over 100,000 homes and businesses were left without power.

=== Netherlands ===
During the first week of January, the Netherlands received 70 to 90 millimetres (2.8 to 3.5 in) of rain, equivalent to a whole month's worth. Winds reached force 9 on the Beaufort scale, accompanied by thunderstorms with hail. Additionally, high tide during this season prevented rapid drainage into the sea. The combination of low pressure from the storm, shallow waters, and funnel effects led to significant storm surges along the North Sea coast. The resulting surge, reaching 2.3 metres (7.5 ft) at Hoek van Holland and 2.48 metres (8.1 ft) at Rotterdam, along with torrential rains, caused numerous floods.

Rotterdam port operations were reduced, with 11 ships unable to depart and two unable to enter during the storm, as pilotage services were limited. Flights at Amsterdam-Schiphol Airport were disrupted, and ferries to Dutch islands were canceled. Evacuations occurred in the north of the country as dikes threatened to breach in certain areas.

=== Germany and Northern Europe ===
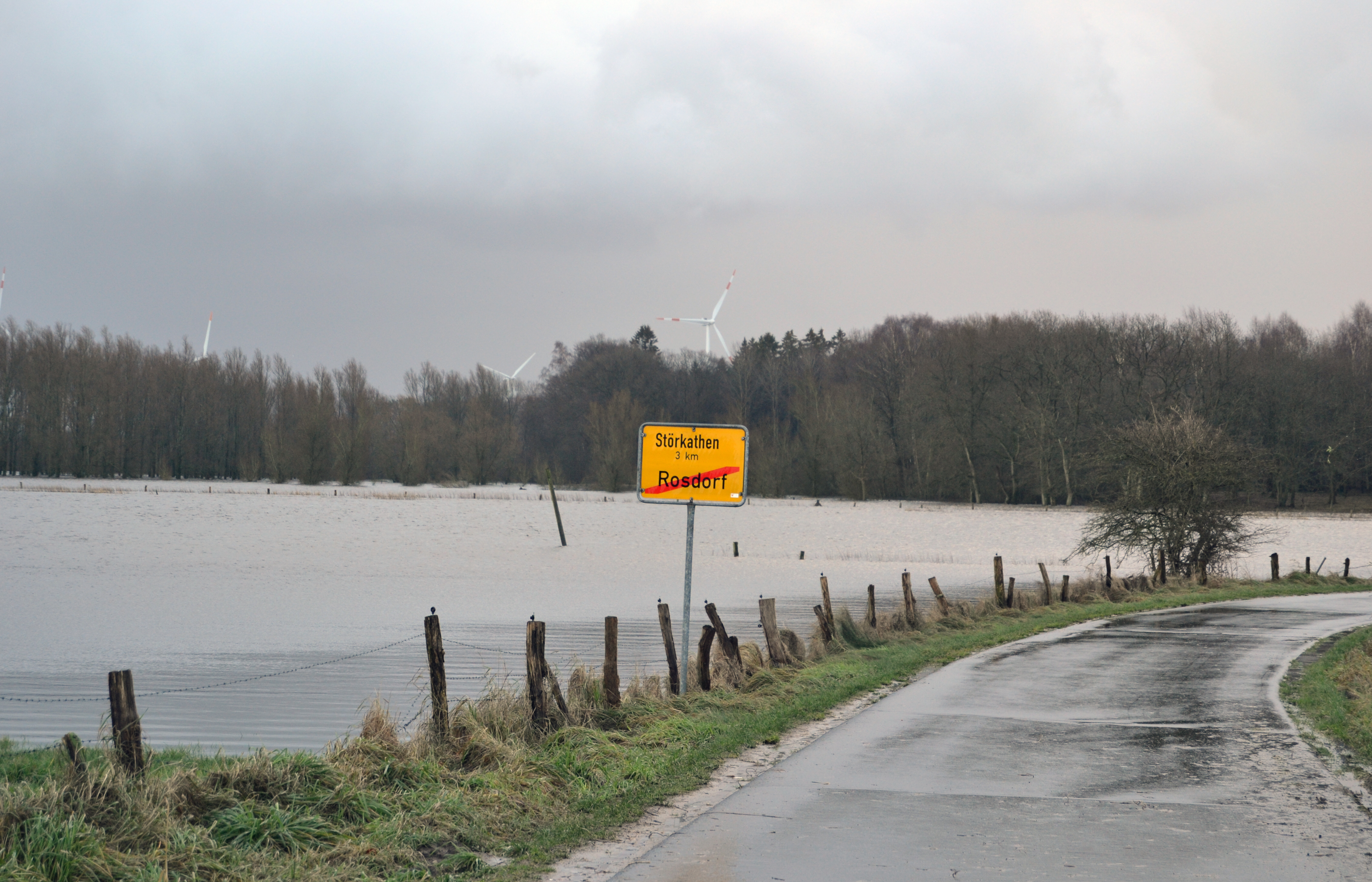
Flooding in Rosdorf.

In North Rhine-Westphalia, the water level of the Rhine approached critical levels in Cologne, forcing boats to stay in the middle of the river while dikes were raised to prevent flooding. The federal maritime and hydrological agency issued storm surge alerts for the northern Frisian coast and Hamburg. Many trees were toppled by the wind in Saxony, causing power outages. In Regensburg, the roof of a furniture store was severely damaged, and Munich's English Garden was affected. A local train derailed in Reken due to a fallen tree, and the line in Geltendorf was blocked when another tree fell on a train at the station.

In Upper Franconia, a 43-year-old man died in a head-on collision when his car was blown into the opposite lane by wind gusts. In Ostallgäu, Bavaria, lightning struck the 15th-century church tower, sparking a fire exacerbated by the winds. The winds and snow prevented firefighters from containing the flames, and the tower eventually collapsed.

The Øresund Bridge between Denmark and Sweden was closed to traffic.

=== Belgium and France ===
In the Nord-Pas-de-Calais region, 5,800 households were left without electricity. In Calais, the ferry Berlioz broke its moorings and crossed the port before colliding with the Île de Batz, a cable layer owned by Alcatel, due to winds of 110 km/h (68 mph). In Étaples, a wind turbine lost two blades. In the French Alps, 20,000 homes lost power due to winds and snow accumulations, with the departments of Haute-Savoie, Isère, and Savoie particularly affected. Météo-France issued an orange alert for Corsica as Andrea's trajectory was expected to head towards the Mediterranean. All flights to the island were canceled on the afternoon of 5 January.

The Royal Meteorological Institute of Belgium issued an orange alert for the entire country. The roof of a school was blown off in Quenast, Walloon Brabant province, two cargo planes were diverted from Liège Airport, and rivers overflowed.

=== Central Europe ===
In Switzerland, train services were suspended, operations at Zurich Airport were disrupted, and the central wine production region was particularly affected. Wind gusts of 83 km/h (52 mph) were recorded in Zurich on 5 January, and up to 210 km/h (130 mph) at the Grand St. Bernard Pass.

The storm left significant snow accumulations in Austria, with avalanche warnings issued for the western part of the country. Between 5 and 9 January, 216 centimetres (85 in) fell in Hochfilzen and 177 centimetres (70 in) in Langen am Arlberg. The Austrian meteorological service announced that such totals are only reached once a decade. The winds also toppled numerous trees. In Tyrol and Vorarlberg, villages were cut off, and roads were covered with thick snow. Hundreds of skiers were stranded in Ischgl when the police closed roads following two avalanches. Ski lifts were stopped, and helicopters had to be used to bring inexperienced skiers back to the ski resort.

A 15-year-old skier went missing near Innsbruck. Avalanche risks and the thick snow cover made search efforts difficult. The rescue team of 450 people used dogs, heat sensors, and radar but eventually had to abandon the search on 13 January.

== Costs ==
Interpolis, a subsidiary of the largest Dutch insurance company Achmea, estimated compensation received for wind and rain damage in the first week of 2012, including damages from Cyclone Ulli, at around €2 million.
