= Federal Department of Defence, Civil Protection and Sport =

Swiss government department

- (In German) Eidgenössisches Departement für Verteidigung, Bevölkerungsschutz und Sport; (In French) Département fédéral de la défense, de la protection de la population et des sports; (In Italian) Dipartimento federale della difesa, della protezione della popolazione e dello sport; (In Romansh) Departament federal da defensiun, protecziun da la populaziun e sport

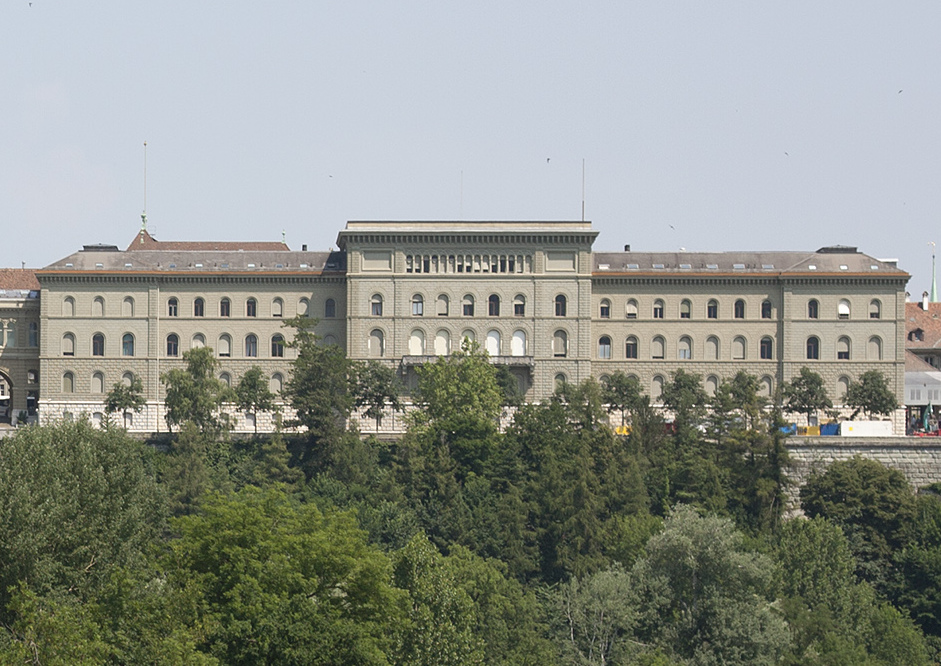
- The east wing of the Federal Palace of Switzerland

Agency overview
- Formed: 1848; 178 years ago
- Jurisdiction: Federal administration of Switzerland
- Headquarters: Federal Palace (east wing), Bern
- Employees: 11,595
- Annual budget: Expenditure: CHF 6.5 billion; Revenue: CHF 1.6 billion; (2009)
- Minister responsible: Martin Pfister, Federal Councillor
- Website: www.vbs.admin.ch

The Federal Department of Defence, Civil Protection and Sport (DDPS, German: Eidgenössisches Departement für Verteidigung, Bevölkerungsschutz und Sport, French: Département fédéral de la défense, de la protection de la population et des sports, Italian: Dipartimento federale della difesa, della protezione della popolazione e dello sport, Romansh: Departament federal da defensiun, protecziun da la populaziun e sport) is one of the seven departments of the Swiss federal government. It is headed by a member of the Swiss Federal Council, the Swiss defence minister. In 1998, its name was changed from Federal Military Department to its current day iteration.

== Organisation ==
The department is composed of the following administrative units:

- General Secretariat
- Swiss Armed Forces
  - Land Forces
  - Air Force
  - Armed Forces Logistics Organisation
  - Armed Forces Command Support Organisation
- Federal Office for Civil Protection (FOCP)
  - Coordination of the civil protection services of the cantons and municipalities
  - National Emergency Operations Centre
  - Spiez Laboratory, responsible for weapons of mass destruction research and protection
- Federal Office of Sport: responsible for sport policy, the National Youth Sports Centre Tenero and the Youth and Sport organisation.
- Federal Office for Defence Procurement (armasuisse): Responsible for armaments procurement, technology and research
- Federal Office of Topography (Swisstopo): compiles and manages geographical reference data and maps
- Office of the Armed Forces Attorney General / Military Justice: The military prosecutor's office.
- Federal Intelligence Service (FIS): Switzerland's civil intelligence service.

== Name of department ==
- 1848: Military Department
- 1979 - 1998: Federal Military Department
- Since 1998: Federal Department of Defence, Civil Protection and Sport

== List of heads of the department ==
- 1848–1854: Ulrich Ochsenbein
- 1855–1859: Friedrich Frey-Herosé
- 1860–1861: Jakob Stämpfli
- 1862 only: Constant Fornerod
- 1863 only: Jakob Stämpfli
- 1864–1866: Constant Fornerod
- 1867–1868: Emil Welti
- 1869 only: Victor Ruffy
- 1870–1871: Emil Welti
- 1872 only: Paul Cérésole
- 1873–1875: Emil Welti
- 1876–1878: Johann Jakob Scherer
- 1879–1888: Wilhelm Hertenstein
- 1889–1890: Walter Hauser
- 1891–1897: Emil Frey
- 1897–1898: Eduard Müller
- 1899 only: Eugène Ruffy
- 1900–1906: Eduard Müller
- 1907 only: Ludwig Forrer
- 1908–1911: Eduard Müller
- 1912–1913: Arthur Hoffmann
- 1914–1919: Camille Decoppet
- 1920–1929: Karl Scheurer
- 1930–1940: Rudolf Minger
- 1940–1954: Karl Kobelt
- 1955–1966: Paul Chaudet
- 1967–1968: Nello Celio
- 1968–1979: Rudolf Gnägi
- 1980–1983: Georges-André Chevallaz
- 1984–1986: Jean-Pascal Delamuraz
- 1987–1989: Arnold Koller
- 1989–1995: Kaspar Villiger
- 1996–2000: Adolf Ogi
- 2001–2008: Samuel Schmid
- 2009–2015: Ueli Maurer
- 2016–2018: Guy Parmelin
- 2019–2025: Viola Amherd
- 2025–present: Martin Pfister

== Full-time positions since 2001 ==
Raw data

"Federal Finance Administration FFA: State financial statements".
"Federal Finance Administration FFA: Data portal".

== See also ==
- Cyber-Defence Campus
- Sport in Switzerland
