= Georges Saint-Paul =

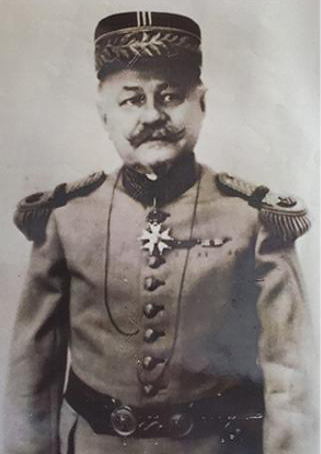
- Born: 17 April 1870; Montigny-lès-Metz, France
- Died: 7 April 1937 (aged 66); Genillé, France
- Other names: G. Espé de Metz

Georges Saint-Paul (17 April 1870 – 7 April 1937) was a French military doctor in general practice, a researcher and the author of literary and scientific works under the pseudonyms of: G. Espé de Metz and Dr Laupts.

== Biography ==
Georges Saint-Paul was born in Montigny-lès-Metz, France on 17 April 1870. He received his medical degree in France in 1892.

After joined the French armed forces, Saint-Paul served as a Doctor-major in Algeria, then in Tunisia. He was then stationed in France at Tours, then Nancy. In 1926, Saint-Paul was appointed director of the Armed Forces Health Service, in Nancy, with the rank of general.

In 1931, he created the Association of Geneva places, to promote areas intended to accommodate civilians in the event of armed conflict, anticipating the principles of the Geneva conventions of 1949.

Saint-Paul died on April 7, 1937, at the Château de Rassay, near Genillé in Indre-et-Loire, France.

== Works ==
Saint-Paul, at the instigation of Alexandre Lacassagne, carried out work on interior language. Defender of a scientific psychology, he intended to democratize the method of introspection by applying it to a large sample of individuals. His program is based on what he calls "cerebrology", or science of the brain, a scientific-medical method allowing to pass from individual psychology to a form of general psychology.

Saint-Paul published several scientific works, including on queer love, which he called "sexual inversion" first, and then "homosexuality", under the pseudonym of Dr. Laupts. In particular, he published a censored version of the text known as the “Roman d’un inverti” or Novel of an Invert, a series of letters sent to Émile Zola in 1889 by an anonymous 23-year-old Italian aristocrat, who recounted his love affairs with men to the novelist. Saint-Paul published a redacted version of the letters in 1894-1895 in the medical journal Archives d’anthropologie criminelle and in a book in 1896, Tares et poisons. Perversion et perversité sexuelles, with a preface by Zola. In September 1896, the author of the letters to Zola addressed the doctor directly, reacting to the publication of his letters to Zola. Parts of this letter to Saint-Paul were published by the doctor in 1910 in L’Homosexualité et les Types homosexuels and in 1930 in Invertis et homosexuels. It was not until 2017 that the letters to Zola and Saint-Paul were published in their entirety. This new uncensored version was published in English in 2022.

Early in his career, Saint-Paul established an epistolary relationship with the German researcher Paul Näcke. In 1908, Saint Paul distanced himself from Näcke about his thesis on the "degeneration of France", through the journal Archives de l'anthropologie criminelle.

Saint-Paul also published more literary, dramatic or poetic works, under the pseudonym of G. Espé de Metz. Under the same alias he contributed to the discussion of colonialism in the press, especially around Algeria. Saint-Paul coined the term "endophasia", which he associated with introspection.

== Publications ==
Under his own name

- Essays on inner language, Lyon, Stock, 1892
- Inner Language and Paraphasias, Paris, Félix Alcan, 1904
- The art of public speaking. Aphasia and mental language, Paris, Octave Doin & fils, 1912

read

- The global role of the military doctor, preceded by a study on the role of the group of stretcher bearers (G.B.D.) during the war, 1918
- Invert and homosexuals, coll. "Thème psychologique", Paris, Vigot, 1930 - 3rd augmented edition (Laupts, 1896 and 1910)

Under the name Dr. Laupts

- Tares and poisons. Perversion and sexual perversity. A medical investigation into the inversion. The novel of an invert-born. The Wilde trial. Healing and prophylaxis of inversion, preface by Émile Zola, Paris, G. Carré, 1896.
- Homosexuality and homosexual types, preface by Émile Zola, Paris, Vigot, 1910 - augmented edition of 1896.

Under the name G. Espé de Metz

- Souvenirs from Tunisia and Algeria, Tunis, J. Danguin, Libraire-Éditeur, 1909.
- Vers l'Empire ..., Paris, Ambert, 1913.
- By the settlers: Algeria to the Algerians and by the Algerians, ПParis, Émile Larose Libraire-Éditeur, 1914.
- Prosodic themes, Paris, Berger-Levrault, 1929.
- I appeal to the civilized world: open letter to the members of the S.d.N.,Paris, R. Brumauld, 1929
- Psychological themes. Poetry, Prosodism, Grammar, Paris, Vigot and Debresse, 1934.
- Ludibria venti. Amusettes, Paris, Debresse, 1935.

== Sources ==
- Michael Rosenfeld and William A. Peniston, The Italian Invert. A Gay Man’s Intimate Confessions to Émile Zola. Columbia University Press. ISBN 978-0-231-20489-7.
- Michael Rosenfeld and Clive Thomson, « Lettres inédites de 1893 à 1925 entre Émile Zola, Alexandrine Zola, Georges Saint-Paul et Yvonne Saint-Paul », Les Cahiers naturalistes, n^{o} 95, 67^{e} année, 2021, p. 97-126.
- Michael Rosenfeld, « [archive]Zola à la pointe des savoirs ? Théories scientifiques et personnages de médecins dans Fécondité [archive]»”, Les Cahiers naturalistes, n^{o} 95, 67^{e} année, 2021, p. 65-80.
- Clive Thomson et Michael Rosenfeld, « Introduction au dossier “Zola et les médecins” », Les Cahiers naturalistes, n^{o} 95, 67^{e} année, 2021, p. 9-14.
- Michael Rosenfeld, « Genèse d’une pensée sur l’homosexualité : La préface de Zola au Roman d’un inverti» [archive], Genesis, n^{o} 44, 2017, p. 211-215.
- Michael Rosenfeld (éditeur), Confessions d’un homosexuel à Émile Zola: Première édition non censurée du "roman d'un inverti" [archive], Paris, Nouvelles éditions Place, 2017.
- Pascal Gontrand, "Georges Saint — Paul - PCPT - Civil protection for all [archive]", Geneva, 2008.
- Carroy, Jacqueline. "Inner language as a mirror of the brain: an investigation, its challenges and its limits", In: Langue française, Vol. 132 no 1, The internal word, 2001 (p. 48-56).
- Souvenance, Jean, Notes sur Espé de Metz (1870–1937) and L. Barbedette (1890–1942), Saint-Brieuc, Author-publisher: Jean Souvenance, 1945.
- Arbinet la Bessède, Paul-Émile, "Le Médecin Général Saint-Paul", in Strasbourg medical, 15, 1937, p. 274-281.
