= 2026 United States–Ukraine–Russia meetings in Geneva =

2026 trilateral meetings in Geneva

- Host country: Switzerland
- Date: 17–18 February 2026
- Cities: Geneva
- Venues: InterContinental Geneva Hotel
- Participants: (United States) Steve Witkoff; (United States) Jared Kushner; (United States) Daniel P. Driscoll; (United States) Alexus Grynkewich; (Ukraine) Rustem Umerov; (Ukraine) Kyrylo Budanov; (Ukraine) Andrii Hnatov; (Ukraine) David Arakhamia; (Ukraine) Serhiy Kyslytsia; (Ukraine) Vadym Skibitsky; (Russia) Vladimir Medinsky; (Russia) Kirill Dmitriev; (Russia) Mikhail Galuzin; (Russia) Igor Kostyukov
- Follows: 2026 United States–Ukraine–Russia meetings in Abu Dhabi (1st & 2nd rounds)
- Precedes: 2026 United States–Ukraine–Russia meetings in Abu Dhabi (3rd round)

Key points
- Russo-Ukrainian war

The 2026 United States–Ukraine–Russia meetings in Geneva were the third round of trilateral talks between delegations from the United States, Ukraine, and Russia. The meetings took place in Geneva on 17 and 18 February 2026. These meetings followed a trilateral format between the three countries similar to what took place in Abu Dhabi some weeks before.

The Geneva meetings happened as the war in Ukraine entered its fifth year, with fighting occurring on multiple fronts and after numerous negotiation sessions struggling to produce any meaningful results.

== Background ==
The first negotiations in a trilateral format between the US, Ukraine and Russia held in Abu Dhabi ended without an agreement on key contentious points such as a ceasefire, territory, the fate of the Russian-controlled Zaporizhzhia Nuclear Power Plant, and security guarantees to prevent a future Russian invasion. These talks were nevertheless described as constructive by the participants and a prisoner exchange took place at the end of the meetings.

Kremlin spokesman Dmitry Peskov said that this round of talks would cover a broader range of issues than the limited set previously discussed in Abu Dhabi. Peskov also said that he did not expect any major developments on the first day, noting that the talks were scheduled to continue on the following day. The Kyiv Independent reported that the talks come after a week of strong criticism from Russian officials, who suggested that only Ukraine's surrrender would satisfy Moscow's objectives. According to the President of Ukraine, Volodymyr Zelenskyy, territory is the main issue to be discussed.

== History ==
On 7 February 2026, Zelenskyy said the US wanted to reach an agreement to end the war by June 2026 and that they invited Ukraine and Russia for talks in the US on the following week, likely in Miami, and he confirmed Ukraine would participate. He added that if the June deadline was not met, the US would likely put pressure on both sides to meet it. However, Russian Foreign Minister Sergey Lavrov said the negotiations were far from finished, rejecting what he called "over-enthusiastic perceptions" of progress, while claiming that the US had backtracked on the terms agreed upon at the 2025 Russia–United States summit, the so-called "spirit of Anchorage". Lavrov also effectively dismissed the US-Ukraine 20-point peace plan, which had been expected to serve as the basis for peace negotiations.

On 11 February, Zelenskyy said the meetings would start on 17 or 18 February and they would be focused on the issue of territory. The US proposal was to set up a free economic zone as a demilitarized buffer zone in the parts of Donbas that Russia did not control, namely about 20% of the Donetsk province. However, both Ukraine and Russia were skeptical about this. Zelenskyy added that the peace proposal would need to be approved by Ukraine, either through a parliamentary vote or a national referendum. The head of Zelenskyy’s party in parliament, David Arakhamiya, said in the previous month that the referendum should be held together with a presidential election. Though, Zelenskyy said that Ukraine would only hold elections after a ceasefire and security guarantees were in place. On 14 February, at the Munich Security Conference, Zelenskyy said that the US was offering security guarantees lasting 15 years as part of a peace deal, but Ukraine wanted them to last more than 20 years. Zelenskyy later added that Ukraine was prepared to hold democratic elections if the US helped to secure a two-month ceasefire to allow for security guarantees and election preparations.

On 13 February, Kremlin spokesman Dmitry Peskov announced that Russia would participate in the trilateral meetings, but that they would be held in Geneva, Switzerland, on 17 and 18 February. He added that the Russian delegation would be led by Vladimir Medinsky. An article in The Kyiv Independent interpreted his appointment as a sign of a potential hardening of the Russian position during the negotiations, given his history of uncompromising rhetoric in previous talks. NATO secretary general Mark Rutte said that Russia wasn't seeking a peace agreement by appointing Medinsky. However, ahead of the meetings, US president Donald Trump urged Kyiv to move quickly toward an agreement. "Ukraine better come to the table, fast," Trump told reporters aboard Air Force One, appearing to suggest that the US and Russia "are in a position" to make a deal.

== Delegations ==
The US delegation was led by special envoy Steve Witkoff and Donald Trump's son-in-law Jared Kushner, and included the US secretary of the army Daniel P. Driscoll and the top US commander in Europe and NATO's chief military officer General Alexus Grynkewich.

The Ukrainian delegation was led by Ukrainian National Security and Defense Council secretary Rustem Umerov and included the presidential office head Kyrylo Budanov, the Chief of the General Staff of the Armed Forces of Ukraine Andrii Hnatov, the head of the ruling Servant of the People party’s parliamentary faction David Arakhamia, Budanov’s deputy Serhiy Kyslytsia, and the deputy chief of Ukraine’s Main Intelligence Directorate Vadym Skibitsky.

The Russian delegation was led by presidential aide Vladimir Medinsky, and included the Deputy Foreign Minister Mikhail Galuzin, the special envoy Kiril Dmitriev, and the chief of military intelligence Admiral Igor Kostyukov.

== Meetings ==
=== First day: 17 February 2026 ===
The meeting on 17 February took place in the afternoon, after the US delegation met with an Iranian delegation, also in Geneva, to discuss Iran's nuclear program in the morning. The talks lasted six hours and were held behind closed doors in their first day.

The leader of the Ukrainian delegation, Rustem Umerov, said the meeting was "focused on practical issues and the mechanics of possible solutions," and thanked the American delegation for "constructive cooperation". A source close to the Russian delegation reported that the negotiations "were very tense", adding that they would, however, continue in the next day. According to the US envoy Steve Witkoff there was "meaningful progress".

Zelenskyy described the first day of talks as "difficult," accusing Russia of prolonging a process that, in his opinion, could already be nearing its final stage.

A spokesperson for Zelenskyy said the talks had addressed Donbas and the fate of the Russian-controlled Zaporizhzhia Nuclear Power Plant, both sticking points since the beginning of the process.

TASS agency reported that according to Italian diplomatic sources, Italian, German, French, and British representatives were also present in Geneva and they were expected to meet with the Ukrainian and US delegations on the sidelines of the talks.

=== Second day: 18 February 2026 ===
On the second day of talks, the talks lasted less than two hours on the morning and ended "abruptly". They were held behind closed doors like in the day before.

President Zelenskyy said the agenda for the second day included humanitarian issues, particularly steps toward a prisoner of war exchange and the release of civilians.

In a sign that the talks had potentially stalled, the two lead US negotiators, Steve Witkoff and Jared Kushner, did not take part in the 18 February meeting, according to US and Ukrainian officials. Other, less senior American negotiators participated in this day's talks.

The leader of the Russian delegation Vladimir Medinsky described the meeting as "tough but businesslike". The leader of the Ukrainian delegation Rustem Umerov reported that "the talks were intensive and substantive".

=== Intermediate developments ===
On 24 February, special envoy Steve Witkoff announced that a bilateral meeting between American and Ukrainian officials would take place in Geneva on Thursday, 26 February. The talks happened in the Four Seasons Hotel. Rustem Umerov led the Ukrainian delegation which included Ukraine's Minister of Economy Oleksii Sobolev. The American delegation was led by Steve Witkoff and Jared Kushner and it included US treasury secretary Scott Bessent. The main objective of the talks was the post-war economic recovery of Ukraine, including the so-called "Prosperity Package" to fund Ukraine's reconstruction. Ukraine hoped to attract about US$800 billion of public and private funds over the next 10 years to rebuild the country. Another of the meeting's goals was to prepare for the next trilateral talks with Russia, which could happen in early March, according to Zelenskyy. He said that the US and Ukrainian delegations would discuss the exchange of prisoners of war between Ukraine and Russia. He also said that the military part of the negotiations was nearing completion, saying negotiators were close to a full draft on a ceasefire monitoring. On the same day, Steve Witkoff and Jared Kushner met with an Iranian delegation, also in Geneva, in the morning and evening, for talks about the Iranian nuclear program.

On the eve of the bilateral meeting, on 25 February, Trump told Zelenskyy in a phone call that he wanted the war to end within a month, and discussed the possibility of a trilateral meeting between Trump, Zelenskyy and Putin. Trump also reiterated his willingness to provide Ukraine with substantial US security guarantees as part of a peace agreement. Later, the Russian Foreign Minister Sergey Lavrov replied saying that there were "no deadlines" for the end of the conflict, and that Russia had tasks to fulfill and was working to accomplish them. Kremlin spokesman Dmitry Peskov also stated it was too early to make "forecasts" or say at what stage the peace process was at.

On 28 February, the Head of the Office of the President of Ukraine, Kyrylo Budanov, said Russia had agreed to accept the security guarantees for Ukraine proposed by the US. However, on 5 March, Russia's Foreign Minister Sergey Lavrov denied this, saying that Moscow had neither seen nor accepted any Western security guarantees for Ukraine.

On 5 March, it was announced that a prisoner of war exchange agreement between Russia and Ukraine was achieved in the negotiations during the first round of trilateral meetings. The first phase of the exchange began on this day when 200 prisoners from each side were exchanged, with the second phase happening on 6 March, when 300 prisoners were exchanged. In total, over the two days, the exchange was of 500 prisoners from each side.

Bilateral meetings between US and Ukrainian delegations were held on 21 and 22 March in Miami, Florida. The focus of the meetings was on issues of reliable security guarantees and the humanitarian track, including the exchange and return of Ukrainian citizens. Zelenskyy said that progress was made on the prisoners of war issue. Ukraine expected these meetings to serve as a preparatory step for future trilateral talks involving Ukraine, the US and Russia.

In the aftermath, several prisoner of war exchanges happened with the mediation of the US and the United Arab Emirates: On 11 April a prisoner of war exchange happened, with 175 Ukrainian soldiers and 7 civilians being exchanged for 175 Russian soldiers. On 24 April, Russia and Ukraine swapped each 193 prisoners of war. On 15 May, 205 prisoners of war from each side were exchanged as part of the first stage of a 1000 for 1000 planned exchange between Russia and Ukraine. On 5 June, another prisoner of war exchange between Russia and Ukraine happened, with 185 for 185 prisoners being swapped. On 26 June, 160 for 160 prisoners were exchanged.

=== Further trilateral talks ===
At the end of this round of meetings, Medinsky said a new round of negotiations would take place in the near future. On 20 February, Zelenskyy announced that another round of trilateral meetings would take place within 10 days, likely also in Geneva. On 25 February, Zelenskyy said that another round of trilateral meetings was being prepared and that it could happen in early March. According to a source cited by Bloomberg, the talks could take place around 4–5 March. On 2 March, Zelenskyy said the negotiations were tentatively scheduled for 5–6 March in Abu Dhabi, but there were doubts as to whether they would happen due to the war between the US and Iran. On 3 March, the Kremlin said that the next round of trilateral talks, originally to be held in Abu Dhabi, was now in doubt due to the war in Iran. On 5 March, Zelenskyy said the next round of trilateral meetings could be postponed "for a while due to the ‌war in the Middle East". He also said he was open to other location for the talks, such as Turkey or Switzerland. On 19 March, the Kremlin spokesman Dmitry Peskov confirmed that the trilateral talks were "on pause", though contacts between Russia and Ukraine continued on humanitarian issues such as the exchange of prisoners and of the bodies of fallen soldiers.

== November 2026 parallel diplomatic tracks ==
In late October 2026, two parallel diplomatic tracks emerged aimed at addressing the ongoing Russian invasion of Ukraine, showcasing distinct approaches by global superpowers and the Ukrainian government.

=== U.S.–Ukraine–Russia technical negotiations ===
Following meetings in late October 2026 between Ukrainian President Volodymyr Zelenskyy and U.S. Special Envoy Steve Witkoff, Ukraine confirmed that Washington had proposed a tripartite negotiation format between the working teams of Ukraine, the United States, and Russia. Russian presidential aide Yury Ushakov stated that Moscow welcomed the proposal and was prepared to begin these technical-level meetings after November 4, 2026. Scheduled for the first half of November, with Abu Dhabi being considered as a primary neutral venue, the talks are designed to serve as a preparatory step for a future leaders' summit. The primary objectives for the Ukrainian delegation include securing a practical agreement on mutual cessation of strikes on energy infrastructure, restoring safe merchant shipping in the Black Sea, and executing an all-for-all prisoner exchange.

=== The "Shenzhen Factor" summit ===
Concurrently, a separate and more controversial diplomatic initiative, dubbed the "Shenzhen Factor", was advanced by Russian President Vladimir Putin, proposing a trilateral summit between the leaders of the United States, China, and Russia without the participation of Ukraine or the European Union. The high-level meeting is being prepared by Beijing to take place on the sidelines of the APEC Summit in Shenzhen, China, on November 18–19, 2026. U.S. President Donald Trump indicated his openness to the meeting, stating his intention to discuss broader global issues with Xi Jinping and Putin, including trade, nuclear weapons, and Korean denuclearization. President Zelenskyy sharply criticized the format, insisting that Ukraine must be directly consulted on any agenda concerning its future and warning that such exclusive meetings could undermine Ukraine's sovereignty and inadvertently ease Putin's international isolation. European leaders, including Lithuanian President Gitanas Nausėda, also expressed deep concern over the trilateral format, arguing that negotiating European security architecture without the direct involvement of Ukraine and the EU is fundamentally dangerous.

== Reactions and outcomes ==
According to Axios, progress in Geneva was limited. Axios reported that discussions among the military on mechanisms to monitor a ceasefire were constructive and Zelenskyy said Ukrainian forces were now ready to monitor a ceasefire, should there be the political will to enforce it. However, the political negotiations remained "stuck", with the Russian envoys insisting on full control of the Donbas. In the interview with Axios published on 17 February, Zelenskyy said that any agreement requiring the Ukrainian forces to unilaterally withdraw from the remainder of the Donbas they still controlled, about 20% of the Donetsk province, and hand it over to Russia, would have to be approved in a national referendum, and that this would not happen.

In an interview with Agence France-Press on 20 February, Zelenskyy stated that both the US and Russia were pressuring Ukraine to withdraw from the rest of Donbas and cede the territory to Russia in exchange for a quick peace deal. "Both the Americans and the Russians say that if you want the war to end tomorrow, get out of Donbas," Zelenskyy said. Otherwise, Russia vowed to take the territory by force. Ukraine has repeatedly ruled out pulling its troops out of the region, saying such a move would only embolden Russia. The US and Russia were also pressuring Ukraine to hold presidential elections as part of its broader plan for a peace agreement. He also said that he wished that a contingent of European troops to be sent to Ukraine once a ceasefire was reached, and that this contigent would be positioned close to the front line.

On 23 February, the high representative of the European Union for foreign affairs and security policy, who is also the first vice-president of the European Commission, Kaja Kallas, stated that the European Union was demanding the withdrawal of Russian troops from occupied areas in Moldova (Transnistria) and Georgia (South Ossetia and Abkhazia) in the negotiations for a long lasting and balanced peace agreement in Ukraine.

== See also ==
- Peace negotiations in the Russo-Ukrainian war
- United States and the Russian invasion of Ukraine
