= 2026 United States–Ukraine–Russia meetings =

2026 United States–Ukraine–Russia meetings may refer to:

- 2026 United States–Ukraine–Russia meetings in Abu Dhabi
- 2026 United States–Ukraine–Russia meetings in Geneva
