= International Press Institute =

International Association for Journalism and Press media

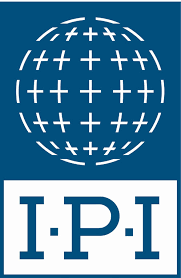
- Company type: Non-profit organization
- Industry: Journalism, human rights, social justice
- Founded: October 1950; 75 years ago
- Headquarters: Vienna, Austria
- Website: ipi.media

International Press Institute (IPI) is a global organisation dedicated to the promotion and protection of press freedom and the improvement of journalism practices. The institution was founded by 34 editors from 15 countries at Columbia University in October 1950.

IPI has a membership category: "IPI Leading Journalists", which is open to heads of media departments, bureau chiefs and media correspondents.

IPI is a member of the International Freedom of Expression Exchange, a global network of non-governmental organisations that monitors press freedom and free expression violations worldwide.

In October 2006, the National Television Academy (NTA) honored IPI with an International Emmy Award for its press freedom work.

== Activities ==
=== Protest letters ===
IPI monitors press freedom around the world and responds to threats and attacks on journalists and media outlets by sending protest letters to governments and inter-governmental organisations. These threats are often brought to IPI's attention by its members, many of whom experience such difficulties first-hand while carrying out their profession.

=== Press freedom missions ===
IPI leads missions to countries where press freedom is under threat, meeting with government officials, diplomats, journalists and non-governmental organisations, and providing legal representation and support in court cases.

=== Research ===
IPI undertakes extensive research on issues relevant to the media and circulates several publications on press freedom, including the quarterly magazine IPI Global Journalist. IPI regularly scrutinises new media laws and provides governments with recommendations on how to bring their legislation in line with internationally accepted standards on freedom of expression. IPI also monitors journalists killed worldwide. Since 1997, it has kept a Death Watch of media casualties.

=== World Press Freedom Review ===
Each year, IPI publishes an authoritative report on media violations around the world: The World Press Freedom Review.

=== World Press Freedom Heroes ===
In 2000, on the occasion of its 50th anniversary, IPI named 50 journalists "World Press Freedom Heroes". Since then, as of 2011, ten more have been so named, including, posthumously, the murdered journalists Hrant Dink of Turkey and Anna Politkovskaya of Russia.

=== IPI Free Media Pioneer Award ===
Established in 1996, the IPI Free Media Pioneer Award honours individuals or organisations that fight against great odds to ensure freer and more independent media in their country or region. The award is co-sponsored by the US-based Freedom Forum, a non-partisan, international foundation dedicated to free press and free speech.

Recipients of the award started with NTV in Russia in 1996, the Alliance of Independent Journalists in Indonesia in 1997, and Radio B92 in Serbia in 1998. In 2022, there were seven awardees, ABO Local Media Development Agency, Hromadske, Slidstvo.info, StopFake, The Kyiv Independent, Ukraїner and Ukrainska Pravda in Ukraine. IPI described the Ukrainian media organisations as having "[risen] to face head-on the challenges and dangers brought by Russia's war of aggression with courage, quality reporting, and a steadfast commitment to serving local communities at a time of immense need".

=== IPI World Congress ===
Each year, IPI holds an international congress where several hundred publishers, editors and senior journalists from around the world gather to debate and discuss a range of issues that concern the fight for a free media.
