= Joint Plan of Action =

Preliminary pact between Iran and the P5+1 countries in 2013

On 24 November 2013, the Joint Plan of Action (برنامه اقدام مشترک), also known as the Geneva interim agreement (Persian: توافق هسته‌ای ژنو), was a pact signed between Iran and the P5+1 countries in Geneva, Switzerland. It consists of a short-term freeze of portions of Iran's nuclear program in exchange for decreased economic sanctions on Iran, as the countries work towards a long-term agreement. It represented the first formal agreement between the United States and Iran in 34 years. Implementation of the agreement began 20 January 2014.

The Joint Plan of Action and the negotiations under it which followed eventually led to an April 2015 framework agreement and then a July 2015 final agreement, the Joint Comprehensive Plan of Action.

== Background ==
The nuclear program of Iran has been a matter of contention with the international community since 2002, when an Iranian dissident group revealed the existence of two undeclared nuclear facilities.

The International Atomic Energy Agency, charged with monitoring and ensuring peaceful nuclear activities, referred the matter of Iran's nuclear program to the UN Security Council in February 2006, after finding that Iran had not been in compliance with its duties as a signatory of the Nuclear Non-Proliferation Treaty (NPT). For what the IAEA judged to be continued non-compliance, the UN Security Council has voted four times since 2006 to impose limited economic sanctions against Iran. In its resolutions, the Council required Iran to fully cooperate with the IAEA and to suspend all uranium enrichment-related activities. Dore Gold, Israel's former ambassador to the United Nations, has emphasized that the resolutions were adopted under Chapter VII of the United Nations Charter and "are legally binding under international law, adding further legal force to the argument that Iran has no legal right whatsoever to enrich uranium".

In addition, the United States and European Union have voluntarily imposed additional sanctions against Iran, targeting its natural resource exports (particularly oil and natural gas), petrochemical, aerospace and automotive industries, banking system, and access to international finance.

Iran held a presidential election in June 2013 that was won by Hassan Rouhani, his campaign promised moderation and constructive engagement with the international community over its nuclear program and reverse Iran's international isolation. Rouhani was Iran's chief nuclear negotiator from 2003 to 2005.

In addition, the Associated Press reported in November 2013 that officials in the Obama administration had been in contact secretly with Iranian officials throughout 2013 about the feasibility of an agreement over the Iranian atomic program. The report said that American and Iranian officials met face-to-face five times in Oman. The secret meetings, personally authorised by U.S. President Barack Obama, were launched in March 2013 in Muscat, while Iranian President Mahmoud Ahmadinejad was in power. Obama informed Israeli Prime Minister Benjamin Netanyahu of these talks when Netanyahu visited the White House on 30 September 2013.

In parallel with the implementation of the P5+1 interim agreement IAEA and Iran have agreed on a framework for cooperation that includes practical measures that to resolve questions about Iran's nuclear program, including activities that may be related to nuclear weapons.

== Gallery of lead negotiators ==
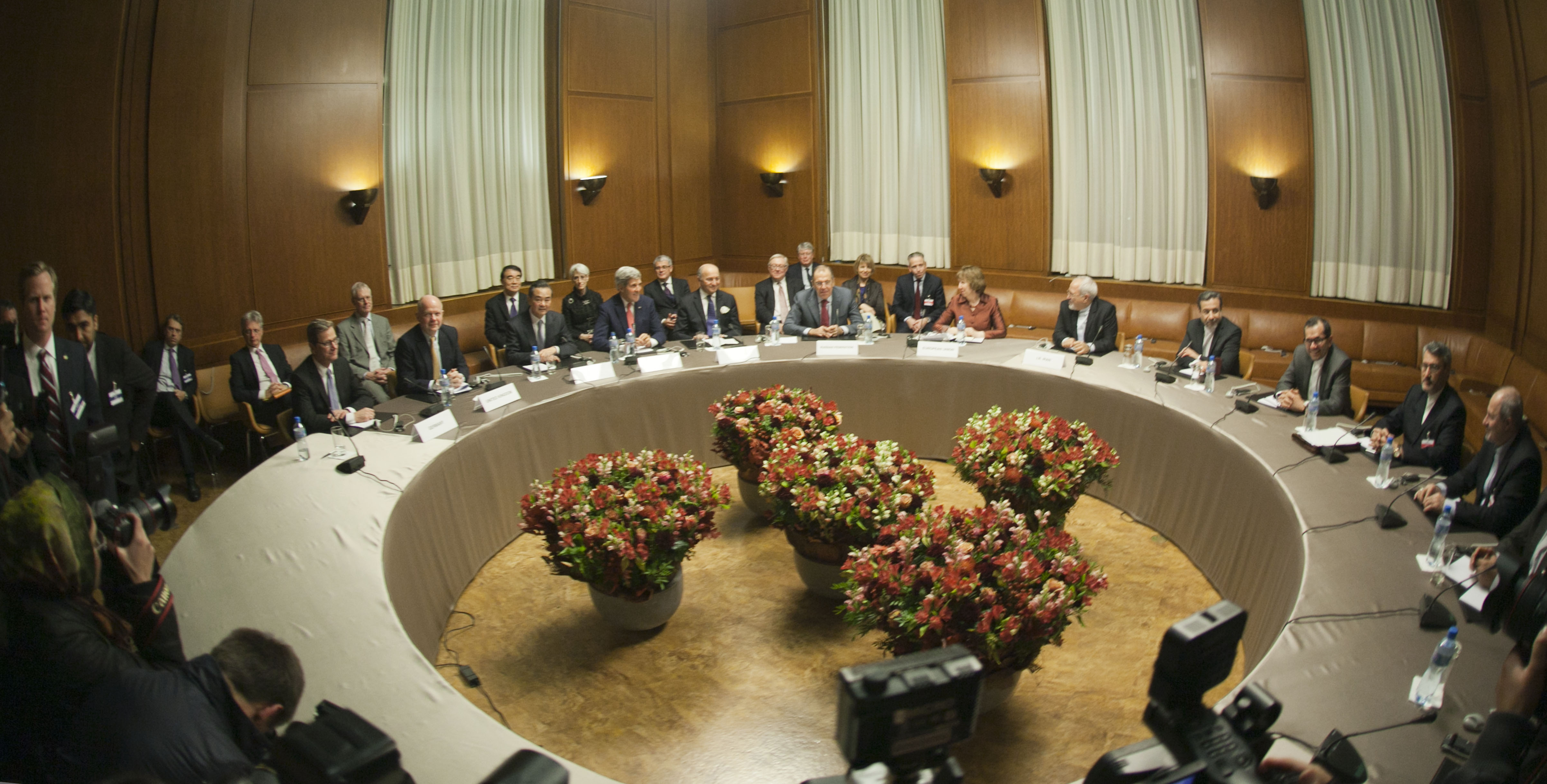
P5+1 and Iranian negotiators meet along with E.U. High Representative Catherine Ashton in Geneva

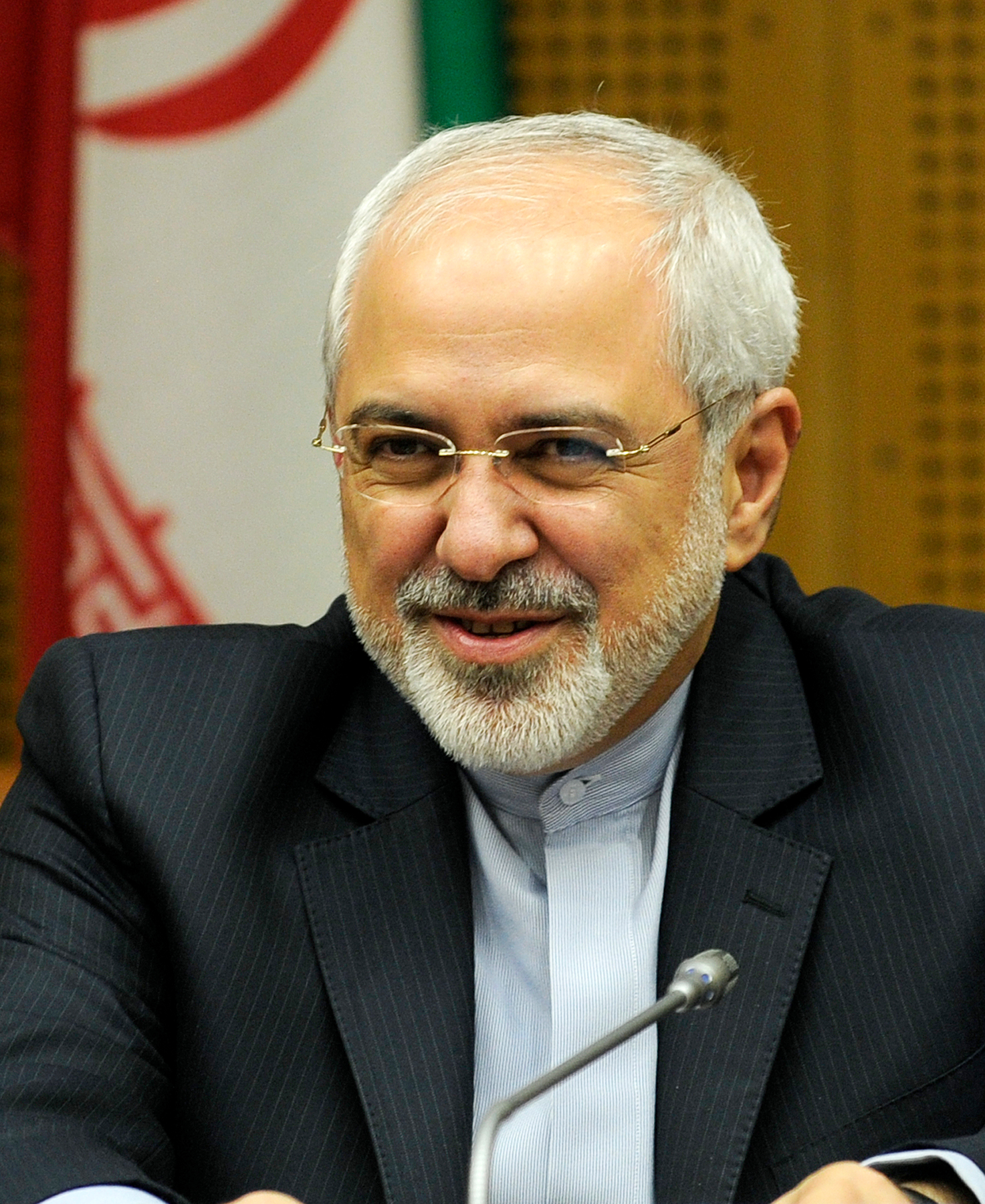
Iran
Mohammad Javad Zarif, Minister of Foreign Affairs

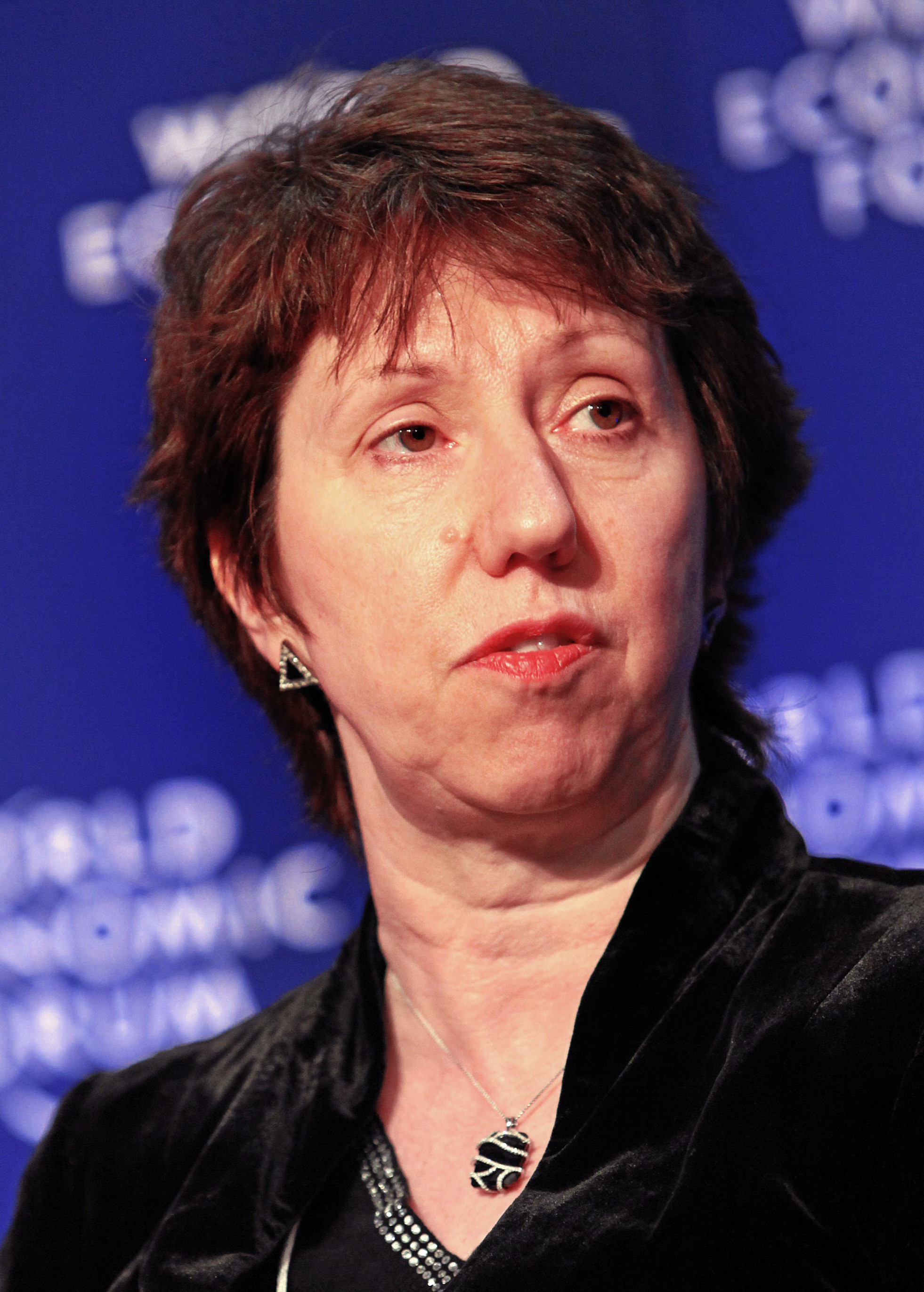
European Union
Catherine Ashton, High Representative

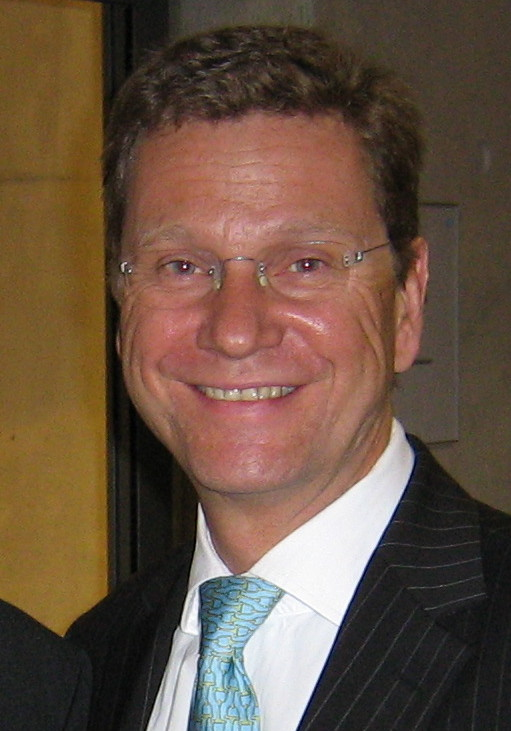
Germany
Guido Westerwelle, Minister of Foreign Affairs

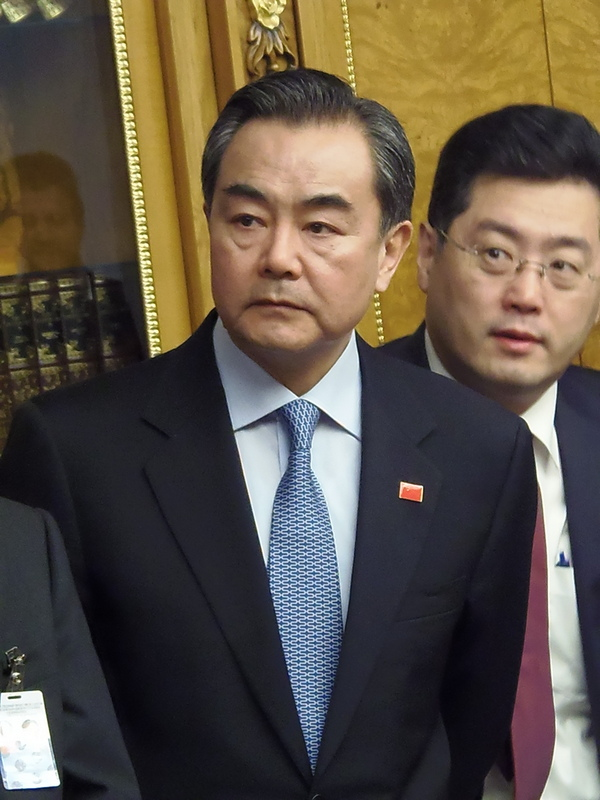
China
Wang Yi, Foreign Minister

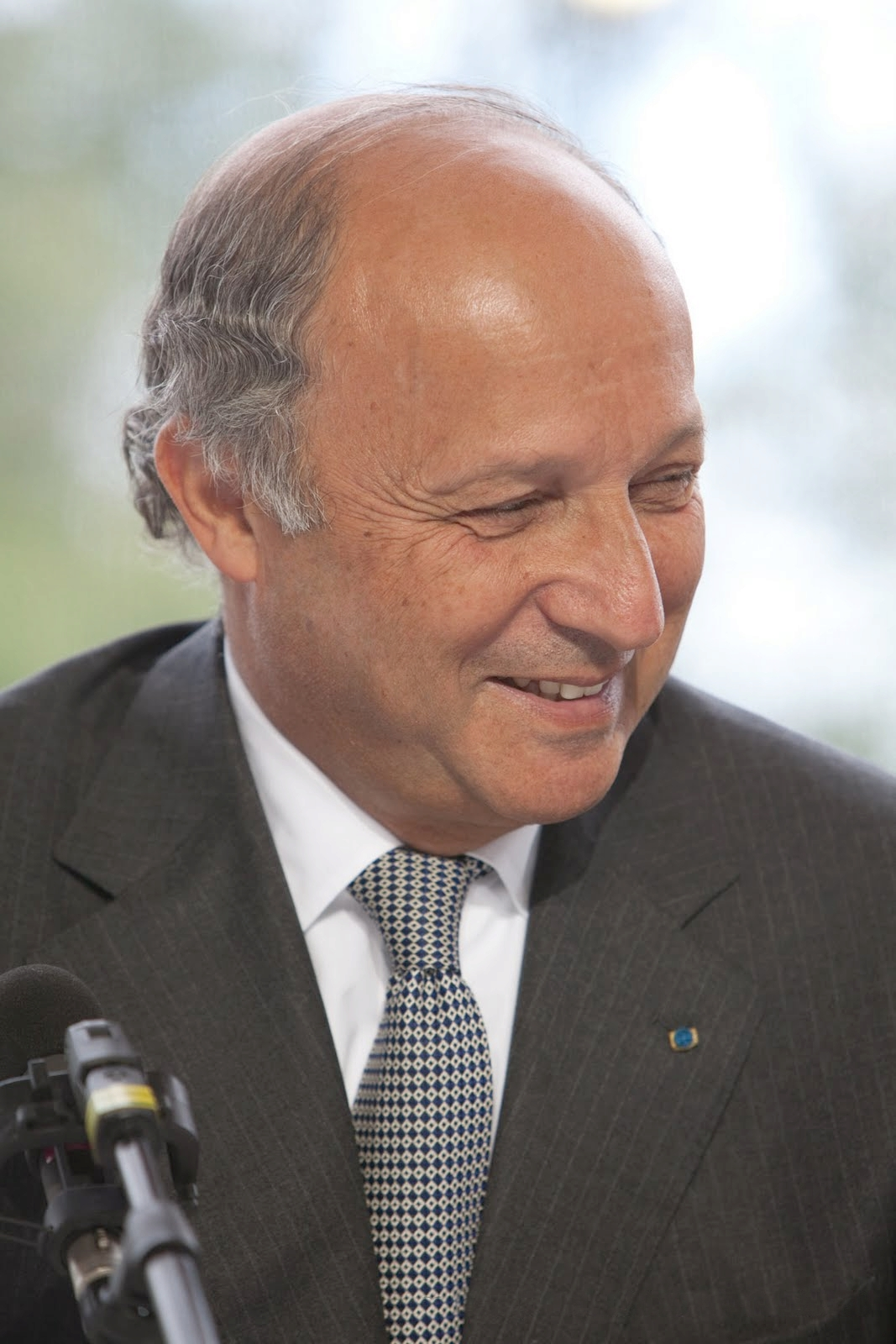
France
Laurent Fabius, Foreign Minister

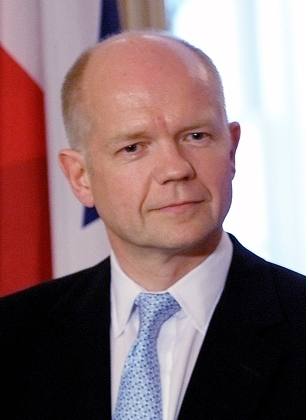
United Kingdom
William Hague, Foreign Secretary

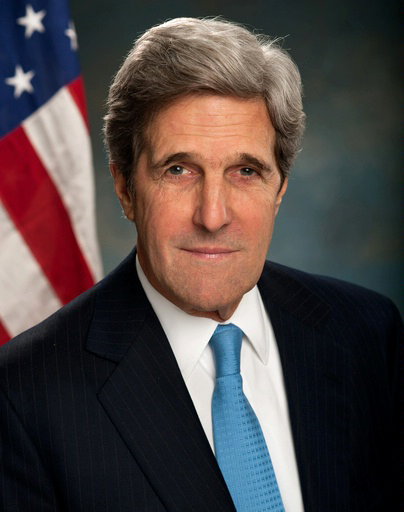
United States
John Kerry, Secretary of State

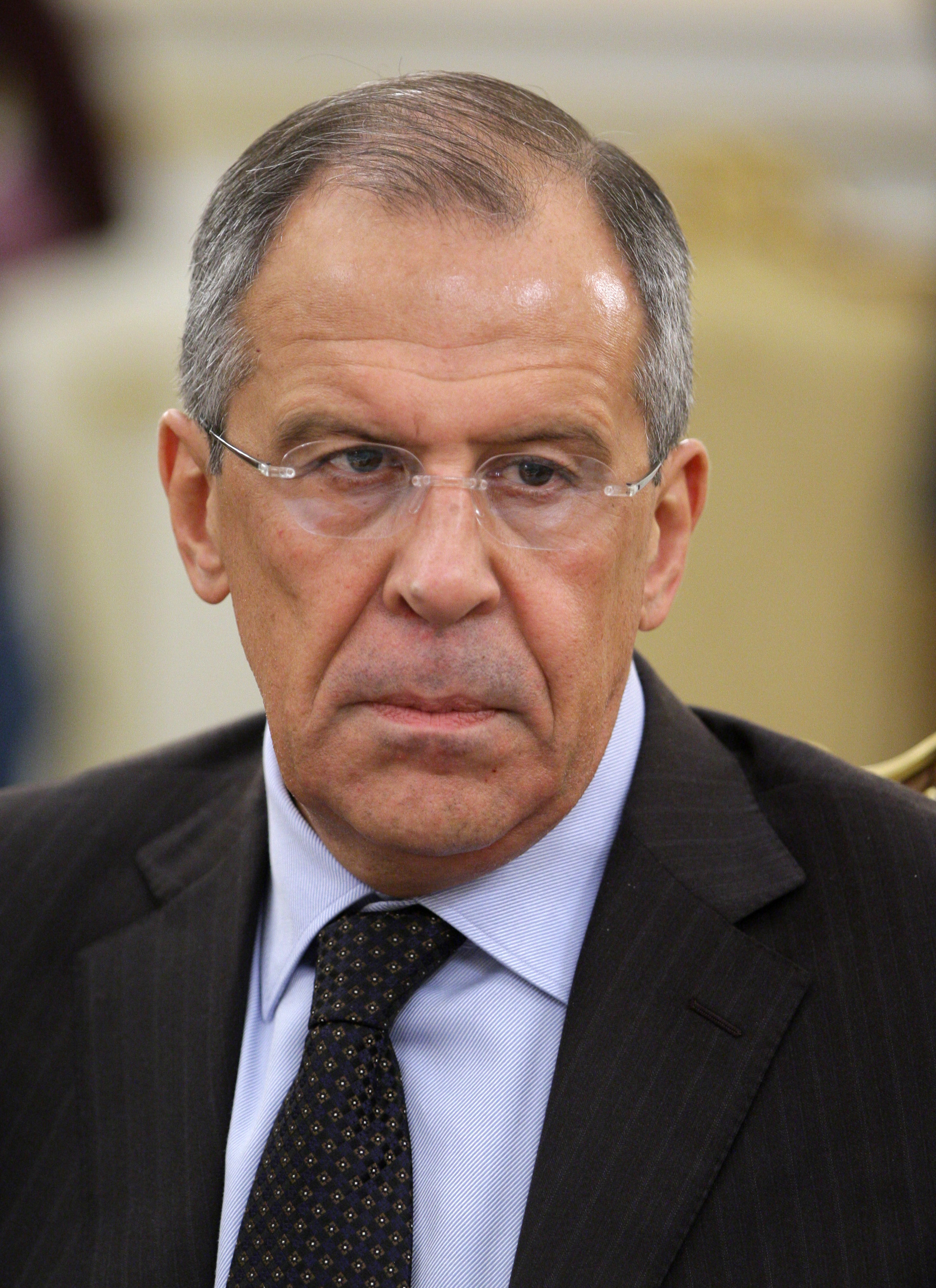
Russia
Sergey Lavrov, Foreign Minister

== Negotiations ==
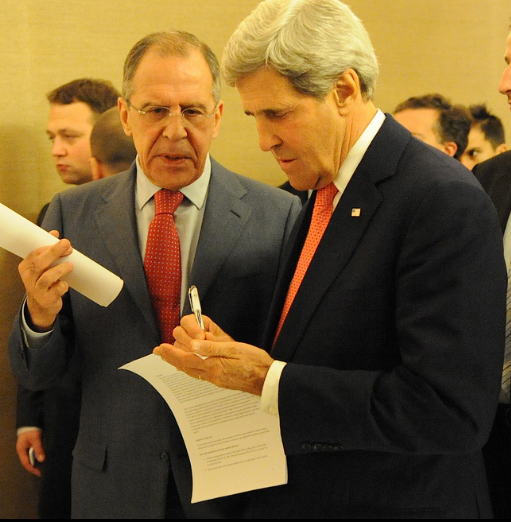
U.S. Secretary of State John Kerry takes notes as Russian Foreign Minister Sergey Lavrov speaks at the Geneva negotiations.

Previous talks between Iran and the P5+1, chaired by European Union High Representative Catherine Ashton, were held in the Kazakh city of Almaty on 26–27 February and 5–6 April 2013, in the Turkish city of Istanbul on 17–18 March, and in Geneva on 7–8 November 2013 all without agreement. The sides agreed to meet again on 20 November.

The 20 November negotiations were attended at the foreign minister level by the participant countries.

The talks opened with a short introduction from Lady Ashton and the leader of the Iranian delegation, foreign minister Mohammad Javad Zarif, before the sides began bilateral discussions.

U.S. Deputy Secretary of State William J. Burns and Jake Sullivan, national security adviser to Vice President Joe Biden, were present for the Geneva talks but were not announced. They stayed at a separate hotel and entered through service doors. Burns and Sullivan were key members of the back channel that President Obama sent to Oman to meet with Iranian officials. Burns was reported to be "in the driver's seat" of the American negotiating team, even though it was officially being led by Kerry and Wendy Sherman. Burns had met secretly with Iranian officials as far back as 2008, when then-President George W. Bush dispatched him.

== Agreement provisions ==
The interim Geneva Accord was signed between P5+1 countries and the Islamic Republic of Iran on 24 November 2013. The deal consists of the short-term freezing of key parts of the Iranian nuclear program in exchange for a decrease in sanctions, as both sides work towards a long-term agreement.

The agreement makes the following stipulations on the Iranian nuclear program:

- All uranium enriched beyond 5% will either be diluted or converted to uranium oxide. No new uranium at the 3.5% enrichment level will be added to Iran's current stock.
- No new centrifuges will be installed or prepared for installation.
- 50% of the centrifuges at the Natanz enrichment facility and 75% at the Fordow enrichment facility will be left inoperable. Iran will not use its advanced IR-2 centrifuges for enrichment.
- Iran will not develop any new uranium enrichment or nuclear reprocessing facilities.
- No fuel will be produced, tested, or transferred to the Arak nuclear power plant. In addition, Iran will share design details of the reactor.
- The IAEA will be granted daily access to Natanz and Fordow, with certain sites monitored by 24-hour cameras. The IAEA will also have access to Iran's uranium mines and centrifuge production facilities.
- Iran will address IAEA questions related to possible military dimensions of the nuclear program and provide data expected as part of an Additional Protocol.

In exchange, Iran will receive relief from sanctions of approximately US$7 billion (£4.3 billion) and no additional sanctions will be imposed. The agreement sets a six-month time frame for a more comprehensive follow-up agreement between Iran and the P5+1 negotiators to formalize Iran's nuclear relationship with the world.

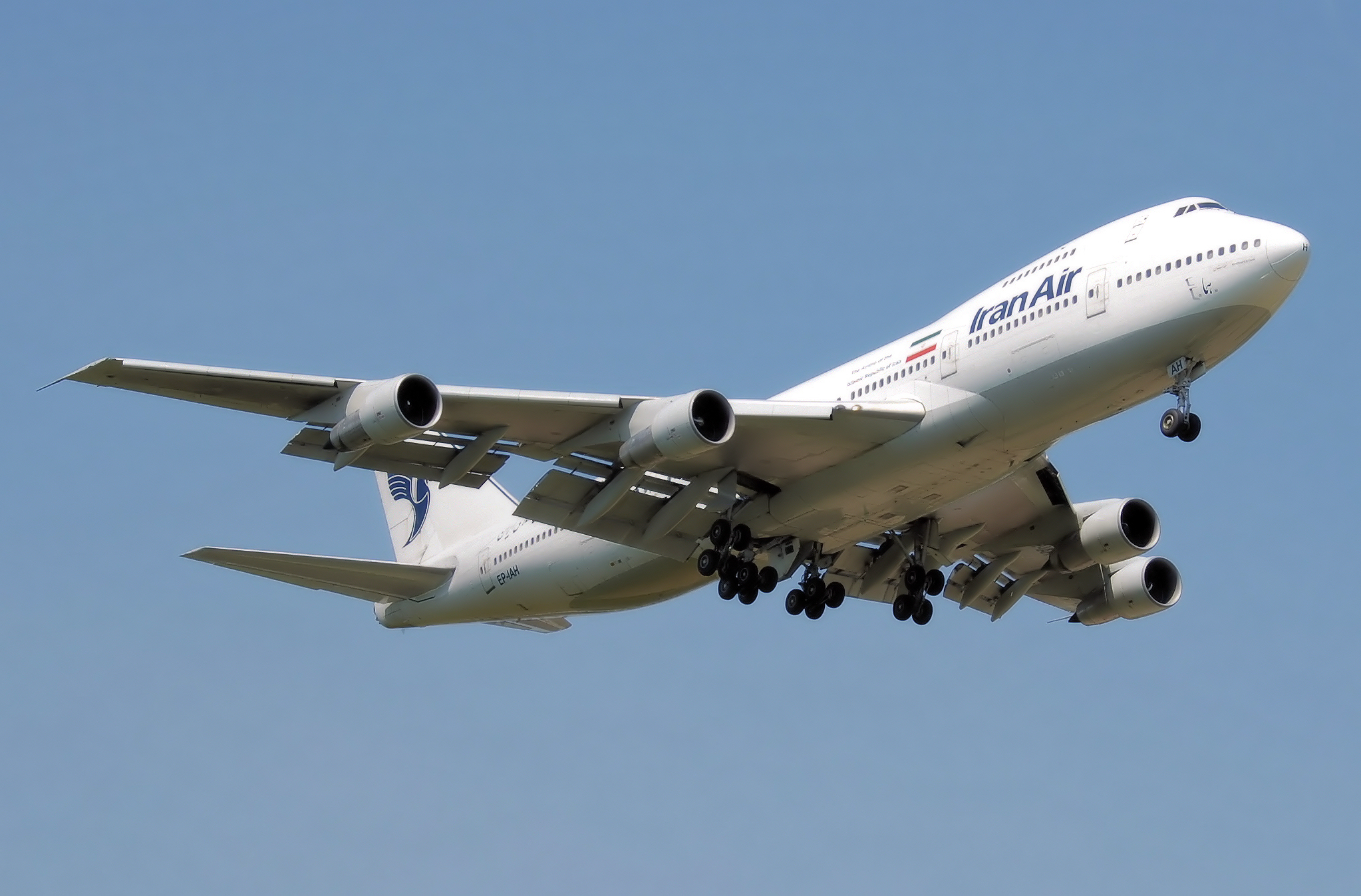
The accord allows Iran to purchase spare parts for its aging airliner fleet.

In addition, sanctions on Iran's auto industry, as well as sanctions on associated services will be suspended. License for the supply and installation in Iran of spare parts for safety of flight for Iranian civil aviation and associated services will be permitted.

According to nonproliferation expert David Albright, the blending down of Iran's 20% enriched uranium will lengthen the time required for a nuclear "breakout" from 1–1.6 months to 1.9–2.2 months.

The terms do not bar Iran from manufacturing components for their nuclear facilities off-site, as long as none of those components are installed. One western diplomat said the impact of this "loophole" would be very minor and could serve as a test of Iranian intentions. The minister Mohammad Javad Zarif announced that Iran has no intentions to increase the capacity of the Arak site, "but construction will continue there".

=== Fissile materials ===
The NPT refers to the "inalienable right" to use nuclear energy for peaceful purposes, in conformity with the treaty's nonproliferation provisions. Those provisions obligate non-nuclear states not to acquire (or seek or receive assistance to manufacture) nuclear weapons, and to place all their nuclear material under IAEA safeguards. Safeguards alone cannot provide assurance about a country's future intent, raising concerns that an Iranian enrichment facility under safeguards today could be used as the basis for break-out from non-proliferation commitments in the future.

Iran asserts that the NPT guarantees a right to enrichment of uranium. Supreme Leader of Iran Ali Khamenei insisted that the right to enrich was a "red line" for the Iranian side. In the past, United States and Europeans argued that Iran should forfeit its right to enrich, despite NPT provisions, due to its secret nuclear activities and failure to meet its obligations under its NPT safeguards.

The interim agreement represents a compromise, and is silent as to whether or not Iran has a right to enrich uranium. It refers to Iran's "right to nuclear energy for peaceful purposes" and in its first phase allows Iran to continue some enrichment activities. Regarding a comprehensive long-term solution, the text states "This comprehensive solution would enable Iran to fully enjoy its right to nuclear energy for peaceful purposes under the relevant articles of the NPT in conformity with its obligations therein. This comprehensive solution could involve a mutually defined enrichment program with practical limits and transparency measures to ensure the peaceful nature of the program," but a footnote makes clear that "nothing is agreed until everything is agreed."

According to Iran expert Ray Takeyh the agreement showed that uranium enrichment is "respected in practice but not acknowledged just yet." A senior U.S. official said "the United States has not recognized a right to enrich for the Iranian government, nor do we intend to. The document does not say anything about recognizing a right to enrich uranium." More generally, a senior U.S. official said "we do not believe any country – not just Iran – has a right to enrichment. The Article IV of the NPT, the Nuclear Nonproliferation Treaty, is silent on the issue. It neither confers a right nor denies a right."

According to an editorial in the Washington Post, the published text means that the United States and other powers "have already agreed that Iranian enrichment activity will continue indefinitely." The document says the final deal will "have a specified long-term duration to be agreed upon," and after it expires, "the Iranian nuclear program will be treated in the same manner as that of any non-nuclear weapon state party to the NPT."

== International reception ==
Iranian foreign minister Mohammad Javad Zarif stated that the agreement ensures Iran's right to enrich. U.S. Secretary of State John Kerry, who led the American negotiation team, responded saying that: "There is no inherent right to enrich," and that "And everywhere in this particular agreement it states that they could only do that by mutual agreement, and nothing is agreed on until everything is agreed on." Russian foreign minister Sergey Lavrov also stated that the agreement recognized Iran's right to enrichment, so long as the program is under IAEA control. Israeli foreign minister Avigdor Lieberman agreed with this assessment of the language in the agreement, although he was displeased by it.

Arab nations Iraq, Syria, Kuwait, Qatar, Lebanon, the United Arab Emirates, Bahrain, and the Palestinian Authority have come out in favor of the temporary agreement. Lebanon also hailed the agreement, while emphasizing that Israel should also sign the NPT and rid itself of its nuclear weapons arsenal. Turkey, India and Pakistan have also welcomed the framework agreement. In a reference to Israel's arsenal of nuclear weapons, Saudi Arabia and Qatar both advocated a comprehensive solution to Iran's nuclear issue which would leave the entire Middle East free of nuclear weapons.

Reaction from Israeli government politicians was negative. Prime Minister Benjamin Netanyahu called the accord a "historic mistake," and intelligence minister Yuval Steinitz compared it to failed nuclear negotiations with North Korea. Considering the way Washington handled the deal with Iran The Jerusalem Post questioned whether Netanyahu would "place Israel's security in the hands of US guarantees". Leader of the opposition Isaac Herzog criticized Netanyahu's reaction as bad for Israel's relations with the United States, although Herzog also said that Obama was partly to blame for not communicating more closely with Israel. Former Israeli military intelligence chiefs Amos Yadlin and Aharon Ze'evi-Farkash also criticized Netanyahu's reaction as damaging to U.S. relations. The former head of the Israeli National Security Council Yaakov Amidror argued the agreement failed to achieve anything significant and came to the conclusion that it "represents a failure, not a triumph, of diplomacy".

Al Jazeera argued that Saudi Arabia, a regional rival of Iran, welcomed the agreement. The Saudi cabinet released a statement which read, in part: "The government of the kingdom sees that if there was goodwill, this agreement could represent a preliminary step towards a comprehensive solution to the Iranian nuclear program" and could eventually lead "to the removal of weapons of mass destruction, especially nuclear weapons, from the Middle East and the Persian Gulf region". The Daily Telegraph reported that Nawaf Obaid, a senior advisor to the Saudi royal family, criticized the way the deal was achieved: "We were lied to, things were hidden from us".

Reaction from the U.S. Congress was mixed. House Majority Leader Eric Cantor and Peter King were sharply critical of the agreement. Democrats Nancy Pelosi and Adam Smith were more positive. Speaker John Boehner and Democrat Eliot Engel were cautious. Reactions from Canada were "skeptical", with Minister of Foreign Affairs John Baird saying Iran "has not earned the right to have the benefit of the doubt."

UN Secretary General Ban Ki-moon hailed the interim agreement as the potential "beginnings of a historic agreement."

Hezbollah published a declaration and stated this is a triumph for Iran.

The American Israel Public Affairs Committee reacted skeptically to the agreement and urged preparation of sanctions legislation in Congress in case it failed, but fell short of calling for new sanctions immediately. Other non-partisan pro-Israel groups, including the Anti-Defamation League and the American Jewish Committee, were cautiously welcoming of the agreement after being briefed by White House officials.

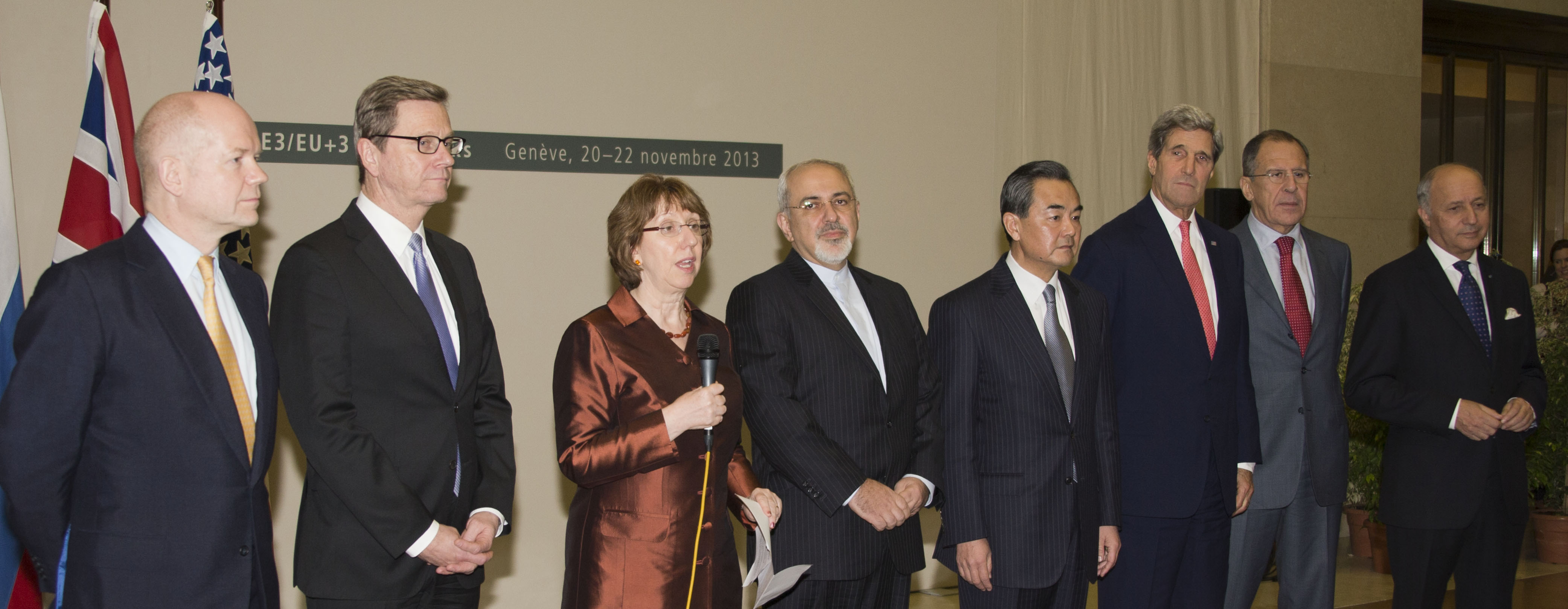
(L-R) British Foreign Secretary William Hague, German Minister of Foreign Affairs Guido Westerwelle, EU High Commissioner Catherine Ashton, Iranian Foreign Minister Javad Zarif, Chinese Foreign Minister Wang Yi, US Secretary of State John Kerry, Russian Minister of Foreign Affairs Sergey Lavrov, and French Foreign Minister Laurent Fabius at a news conference at the conclusion of the negotiations.

== Implementation ==
The representatives of the interim agreement parties announced that implementation of the interim agreement would begin on 20 January 2014.

Iran's negotiator, Araghchi disclosed in an interview that certain elements of the interim agreement are fleshed out in a secret 30-page "side agreement" or "nonpaper." He said it included information about the operation of a joint commission to oversee the interim agreement's implementation. State Department spokeswoman Marie Harf denied later that there was any secret agreement. The text of the implementation agreement was not released to the public. US National Security Council spokeswoman Bernadette Meehan said that this is because the EU is not making the document public." The White House released a summary of technical understandings related to the implementation of the agreement on 16 January.

President Barack Obama welcomed the announcement and said: "Beginning 20 January, Iran will for the first time start eliminating its stockpile of higher levels of enriched uranium and dismantling some of the infrastructure that makes such enrichment possible." The Iranian official, Deputy Foreign Minister Abbas Araghchi noted that unilateral interpretations must be prevented and said: "the use of the word 'dismantle' by Obama was not appropriate."

Implementation began on 20 January 2014, IAEA interim report confirmed that Iran had begun scaling back major nuclear activities, the first steps to implement the interim deal. The report followed by the partial lifting of sanctions by the United States and the EU. Iran's first payment of sanctions relief, of $550 million, is scheduled to be transferred on 1 February. Iran is also scheduled to receive five additional payments of $550 million through the end of July 2014, as well as $900 million in two installments for the dilution of its enriched uranium. European shipping and insurance companies will also be allowed to conduct business with Iranian oil shipments to six countries currently waived from facing U.S. sanctions.

== See also ==
- Comprehensive agreement on the Iranian nuclear program
- List of Middle East peace proposals
- InterContinental Geneva
