= Sara Manisera =

Sara Manisera is a journalist, author and director.

She won the 2018 Golden Dove for Peace, the 2019 True Story Award. and the 2024 European Press Prize.

== Life ==
She graduated from Saint Joseph University of Beirut.

She co-founded FADA collective. She was writer in residence at the University of St. Andrews. She was a Bertha Challenge Investigative Journalist Fellow.

Her work appeared in New Lines Magazine.

She appeared at the Voices Festival. She appeared at the 2018 International Journalism Festival.

== Filmography ==
- The Price We Pay (Greenpeace, 2025)
- ‘La Terra mi tiene’ (The Earth holds me, Fada Collective, 2022)
- ‘Iraq: Youth on the frontline’ (Arte, 2019).
