= Ukraїner =

Educational and multimedia Ukrainian studies project

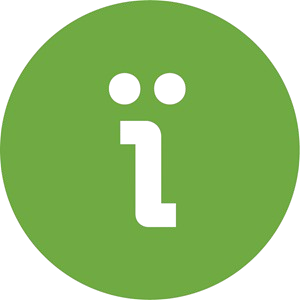
- Website type: Educational
- Available in: Ukrainian; English; German; French; Spanish; Turkish; Russian; Polish; Czech; Georgian; Greek; Japanese
- Founded: 2016
- Website: https://ukrainer.net/
- Commercial: No
- Registration: None
- Current status: Active

Ukraїner is an educational, multimedia Ukrainian studies project, the materials of which are based on the results of socio-cultural expeditions.

== History ==
Ukraїner was created by journalist and writer Bohdan Lohvynenko as a volunteer media project. The team went on the first expedition in June 2016. By the end of 2019, a collection of media materials was created, which are translated into nine languages, two books were published, a full-length documentary was made, project collaborated with the government to popularize initiatives directed to familiarize non-ukrainians with some of the aspects of Ukrainian culture, events were held in a number of European capitals with the support of Ukrainian diplomats.

Following his inauguration, US President Trump ordered a 90–day freeze on foreign aid including support of Ukraine's independent media. Chief Editor of the Kyiv Independent, Olga Rudenko, called for donations to Ukrainian media including Ukraїner to replace this critical US support.

== Concept ==
According to the project participants, the purpose of their expeditions is to help non-ukrainians as well as Ukrainians to explore and understand culture of different Ukrainian regions, document the lives and crafts of local residents, overcome negative stereotypes and develop society where people are open to each other and to change.

The result of these expeditions were more than 200 stories published on the site, two books: "Ukraїner. The country from within" and "Ukraïner. Ukrainian Insider", documentary film "Ukraїner. The Movie". Video materials of the project are shown on Intercity trains and at the airports of Kyiv and Lviv.

Project founder Bohdan Lohvynenko called the lack of information about different Ukrainian regions to be the biggest problem for the development of tourism in Ukraine.

== International projects ==
Since its inception, the Ukraïner team has been striving to attract the attention of foreign tourists to Ukraine and its tourist locations. The website is available in Ukrainian and 11 foreign languages: English, Polish, German, French, Czech, Russian, Spanish, Georgian, Greek, Turkish and Japanese.

Ukraïner participants presented the project in a dozen of different countries. In particular, in Great Britain (October 9, 2019), Finland (October 11, 2019) and Israel (December 24, 2019)

Among the events at which the stand of Ukraine used the videos produced by the project were Frankfurt Book Fair 2019 and Warsaw Book Fair 2019.
