= The Fix Media =

Online trade magazine for media professionals

- Available in: English
- Founded: 2019; 7 years ago
- Headquarters: Online
- Key people: Co-founders: Jakub Parusinski; Daryna Shevchenko; Zakhar Protsiuk; Csaba Galffy
- Industry: Media
- Website: thefix.media
- Current status: Active

The Fix Media is a European trade magazine for media professionals launched in 2019.

In 2022, it led an international campaign to save Ukrainian media amidst Russia’s full-scale military invasion, helping raise around 3 million euros that provided support to dozens of national and local media outlets in Ukraine.

== History ==
The Fix Media was founded in 2019 as a non-profit initiative with a goal to report on the European news media market. The publication’s goal is to help “cracking the media management puzzle with insights, solutions and data” with a particular focus on the topic of media revenue. The publisher has a strong geographical focus on Central and Eastern Europe.

The team of co-founders includes Jakub Parusinski, Daryna Shevchenko, Zakhar Protsiuk and Csaba Galffy. Parusinski, Shevchenko, and Protsiuk are also senior leaders at Jnomics, a media consultancy based in the UK and Ukraine. According to Parusinski, the rationale behind launching The Fix was that “[they] had a small team of people doing media consulting and… needed industry research”.

The Fix publishes in English; in 2021 the publication launched a German-language version, which was later discontinued. The outlet’s flagship product is The Fix Weekly Newsletter that comes out every Monday morning. In 2021 the outlet launched its “Media Insider” podcast and held a virtual international conference online #MediaRevolutions.

One of The Fix Media’s areas of focus is industry research. The publication has produced several research reports on topics including TikTok for media companies and the use of artificial intelligence and machine learning by news media.

=== Campaign to support Ukrainian media during Russian invasion ===
In February 2022, in the wake of Russia’s open military invasion of Ukraine, thanks to its Ukrainian roots and expertise in the Ukrainian media market, The Fix Media along with several other partners launched a campaign to save independent Ukrainian media. The campaign attracted broad international attention, including media coverage, and raised around 3 million euros by the end of 2022.

The campaign supported multiple major national news publishers in Ukraine, including Ukrainska Pravda, NV, Hromadske, Forbes Ukraine and others.

In June 2022, The Fix branched off its charity work supporting Ukrainian media to The Fix Foundation, a newly launched nonprofit organisation with a goal to support free press and innovative media in Ukraine and Eastern Europe.
