= Zakhar Protsiuk =

- Захар Процюк
- Education: Taras Shevchenko National University of Kyiv
- Occupation: Media manager
- Employer: Kyiv Independent

Zakhar Protsiuk (Ukrainian: Захар Процюк) is a Ukrainian media manager who has worked as the chief operating officer of the Kyiv Independent since 2023. He is also a co-founder and former managing editor of The Fix Media.

== Life ==
Protsiuk holds a master's degree in international communications from the Taras Shevchenko National University of Kyiv. He has worked at media consultancy company Jnomics, where he's currently associate partner.

In 2019, Protsiuk co-founded The Fix Media, a European trade magazine for media professionals. In 2022, the organization led an international campaign to save Ukrainian media amidst Russia’s full-scale military invasion, helping raise $4 million that provided support to dozens of national and local media outlets in Ukraine.

In 2022, Protsiuk joined the Kyiv Independent as Chief Development Officer and later Chief Operating Officer (COO). As COO, Protsiuk has overseen the Kyiv Independent’s audience and revenue operations during the full-scale Russian invasion, helping build a newsroom and business team of roughly 70 staff funded primarily by reader revenue. 70% of Kyiv Independent’s revenue comes directly from reader support. In 2025, the publication reached 20,000 paying members.
