= Bohdan Lohvynenko =

Ukrainian author and activist (born 1988)

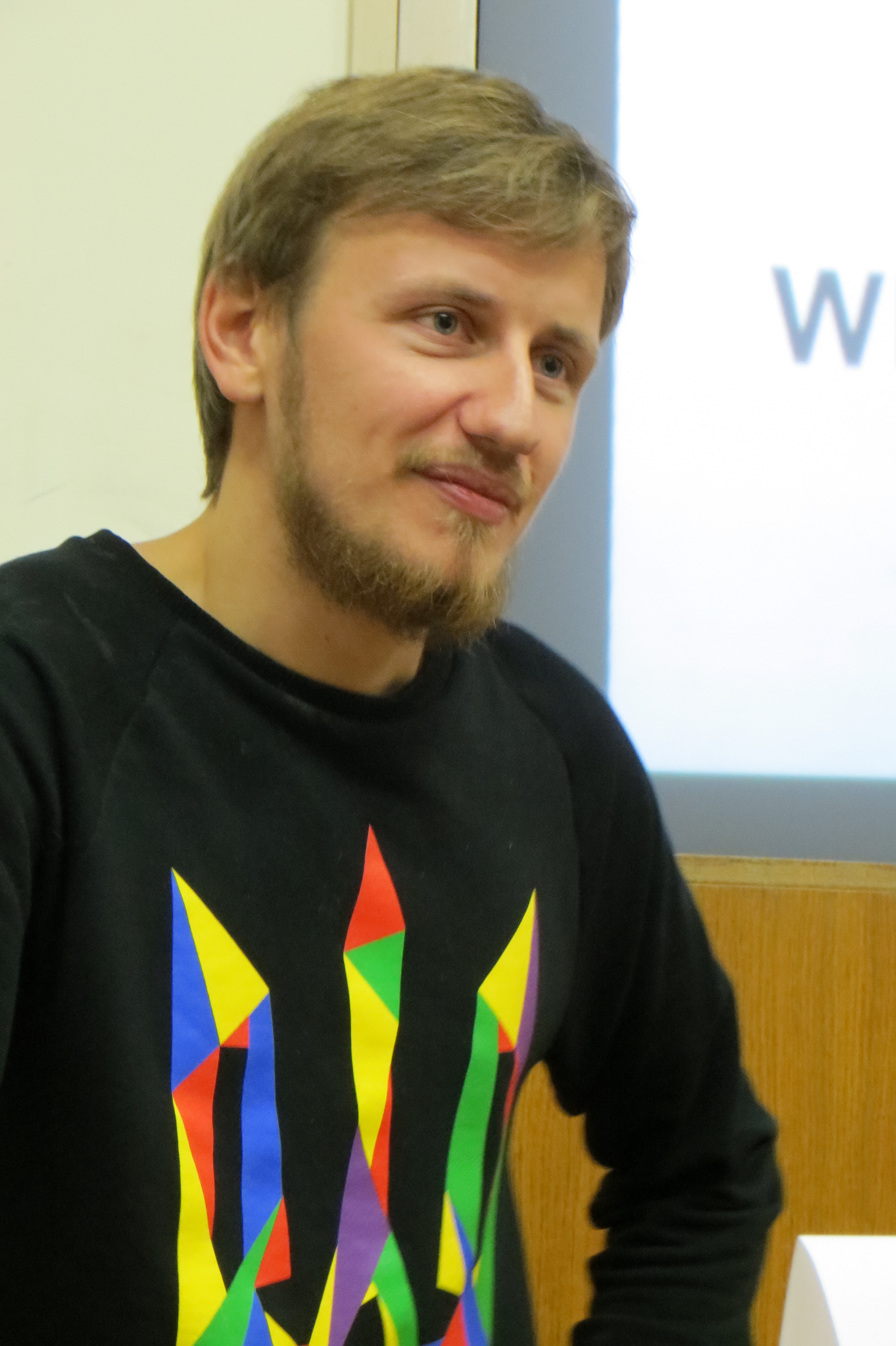
- Lohvynenko at Kyiv University
- Born: Богдан Логвиненко; 23 October 1988 (age 37); Kyiv, Ukraine
- Occupations: Author; journalist; activist

Bohdan Lohvynenko (Ukrainian: Богдан Логвиненко; born 23 October 1988) is a Ukrainian writer, journalist, TV presenter, literary critic, editor, public figure.

Bohdan Lohvynenko was born on 22 October 1988, in Kyiv. He studied Chemistry in Kyiv-Mohyla Academy, and at the Karpenko-Kary Kyiv University of Theater, Film and Television.

In 2005 he founded the online magazine Sumno?, and was its editor-in-chief until 2011.

Since 2006, Bohdan Lohvynenko has been actively opposed to the closure of the Syaivo bookstore in Kyiv and the arbitrariness of Mayor Chernovetsky. In February-September 2007, Lohvynenko worked for Gazeta Po-Ukrainski. Member of the jury "Books of the Forum – 2007". In 2007, he received the Cultural Leader Award for the prompt coverage of cultural events. The following year, Bohdan Lohvynenko entered the jury of this competition.

From 2007 to 2012 he was manager of the band "Dead Rooster".

In autumn 2009, he organized the Antonych Fest festival in Kyiv on the occasion of the 100th anniversary of Bohdan Ihor Antonych

In July 2016, he organized a team to work on the Ukraїner project. Reports about travels to unknown parts of Ukraine are published on the YouTube channel and on the project website.

In 2017, Lohvynenko wrote the article "The second largest biomass. About "Rain" and not only" where he characterized a blogger Sharij as a "mouthpiece of the Russian world". This characteristic was the subject of the claim of honour and dignity protection, but the claim finally was denied by Kyiv Court of Appeal.

== Books ==
- «Богдан Логвиненко про Нестора Махна, Шарля де Ґолля, Олеся Бердника, Джохара Дудаєва, Романа Шухевича». [Bohdan Lohvynenko about Nestor Makhno, Charles de Gaulle, Oles Berdnik, Dzhokhar Dudayev, Roman Shukhevych] — Київ : Грані-Т, 2010. — 76 сторінок. — Серія: «Життя видатних дітей». ISBN 978-966-465-258-9.
- Saint Porno. Історія про кіно і тіло. [A story about cinema and the body] — Харків: Книжковий клуб «Клуб сімейного дозвілля», 2016. — 160 сторінок. ISBN 978-617-12-0861-2.
- Перехожі. Південно-Східна Азія. [Passers-by. Southeast Asia] — Львів: Видавництво Старого Лева, 2016. — 232 с. —ISBN 978-617-679-326-7.
