= Olga Rudenko =

Ukrainian journalist (born 1989)

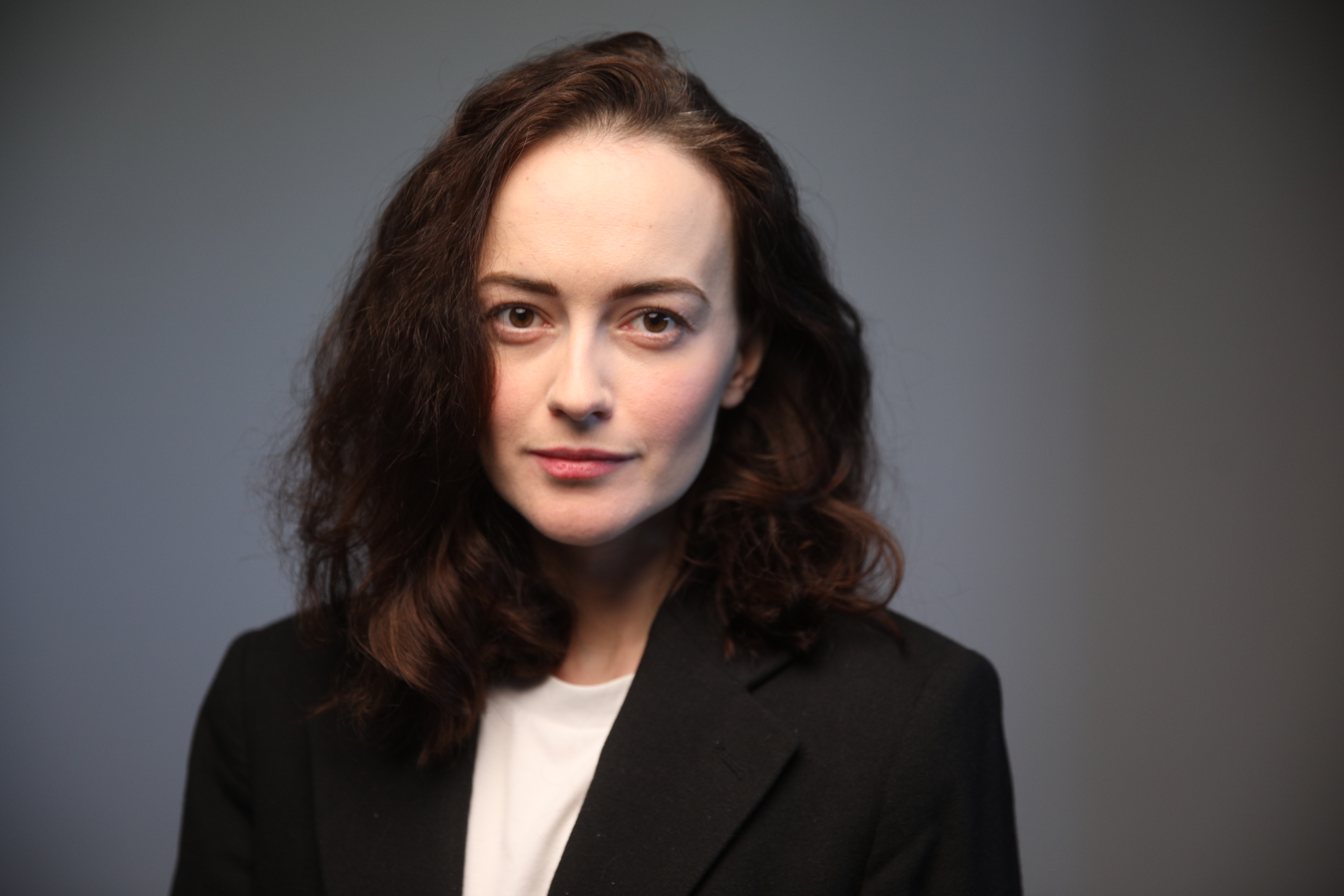
- Olga Rudenko (2022)
- Occupation: Journalist
- Years active: 2011 - present
- Employer(s): The Kyiv Independent; Kyiv Post
- Known for: founding editor of The Kyiv Independent

Olga Rudenko (born 1989) is a Ukrainian journalist who worked for Kyiv Post before leaving to assist in the establishment of the Kyiv Independent in 2021, where she is the editor-in-chief. Her work has also been published in a number of major Western news outlets, including the Washington Times, the Global Post and USA Today.

In 2022, Rudenko featured as the front cover image on Time magazine's May double issue.

== Early life ==
Rudenko's father died when she was four years old. Her mother raised her on her own in Dnipro. Although encouraged to follow an economics career, she chose journalism instead, which she studied at the city's university.

== Career ==
Rudenko began her journalism career by working as an intern at a local newspaper. In 2011 she moved to Kyiv and began working for the Kyiv Post newspaper as a lifestyle journalist, initially contributing to the newspaper's recently established Ukrainian language website. She subsequently wrote articles in English, including covering the 2014 Russian conflict in the Donbas region of Ukraine. In 2016 she was promoted to the post of 'national editor', and by 2017 she had become the deputy to the newspaper's editor in chief.

In 2021, Rudenko accepted the offer of a fellowship from the Stigler Center at the University of Chicago Booth School of Business. Whilst Rudenko was still in Chicago, a large number of her colleagues at the Kyiv Post were sacked by the newspaper's proprietor Adnan Kivan after they refused to accept a new editor Kivan appointed after alleged pressure from Ukrainian authorities, following legal conflict between the Kyiv Post and then-Prosecutor General Iryna Venediktova after critical coverage of Venediktova. Rudenko joined these colleagues who, in November 2021, decided to set up their own, independent news outlet - the Kyiv Independent. She was unanimously chosen to be its editor-in-chief, and by 2022 she was in charge of 24 journalists and editors. The publication was independent.

As Russia's troops gathered on the border, Rudenko described President Volodymyr Zelenskyy as "mediocre" in an op-ed for the New York Times titled "The Comedian-turned-President is seriously in over his Head".

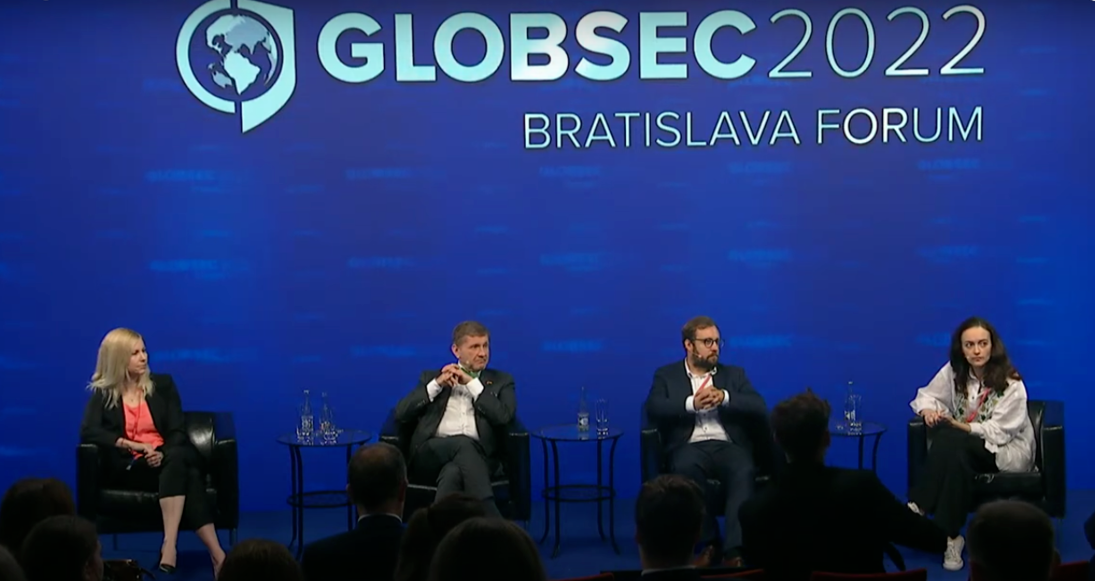
"Risking it all for the Truth: Journalists and Media in Crises" - Panel in Bratislava in June 2022. Left to right Jessikka Aro, Konstantin Eggert, Lukáš Onderčanin and Rudenko.

When Russia's full-scale invasion of Ukraine started in February 2022, Kyiv came under immediate bombardment. With the likelihood of phone and internet connections being lost, Rudenko moved out of the city to western Ukraine where she continued to work to report on the developing situation in her war-torn country. The journalist's wages were supported by a grant from the European Union and the Kyiv Independent's CEO Daryna Shevchenko had to work out how to invest the £1.5m of crowdfunding that the publication had attracted. They needed to find satellite phones, protective clothing and support the two million followers they quickly gathered on social-media.

In May 2022, Time Magazine named Olga Rudenko as one of its Next Generation Leaders and featured her on the cover of its May double issue. Speaking to the magazine about the changing style of news reporting as the Russian invasion of Ukraine unfolded, Rudenko said: "It felt like we were defending the essence of journalism."

In March 2024, Rudenko was named to Ukrainska Pravda's Power of Women list, a list of 100 Ukrainian women who are bringing "victory closer with daily work, self-sacrifice, and care for the next generations of Ukrainians."
