= International Journalism Festival =

Journalism event annually held in Perugia, Italy

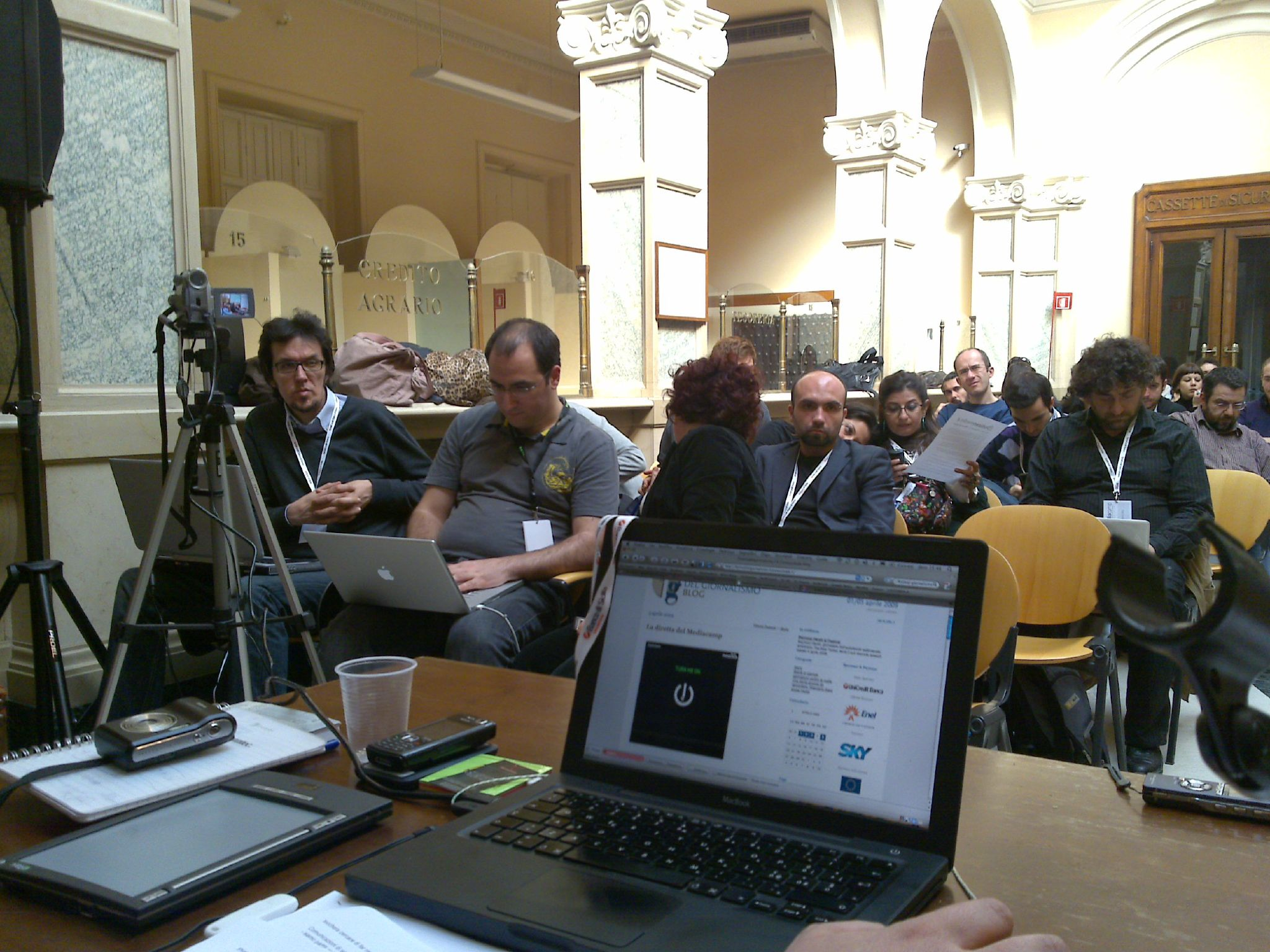
BarCamp on Media, 2009

The International Journalism Festival (Italian: Festival Internazionale del Giornalismo) is a journalism event annually held in Perugia, Italy (in central Italy, about 100 miles, or 160 km, north of Rome). Hundreds of journalists attend panels in venues including thirteenth-century churches to gothic public palaces.

The festival attracts journalists and journalism students, as well as scholars and Media agencies, who get free access to keynotes, workshops, panels and discussions on media in society.

Since the foundation of the Festival in 2006 by Arianna Ciccone and Christopher Potter, several prizes, including A Story Still to Tell Award and the Paola Biocca International Reportage Award have been awarded by students of journalism and media professionals. In 2012 the prize A Story Still to Tell Award was dedicated to the memory of Mauro Rostagno, one of the journalists who was shot by Sicilian Mafia in 1988.

Amongst the speakers that have previously attended the festival are Daryna Shevchenko, Seymour Hersh, Carl Bernstein, Alastair Campbell, Stephen Doig, Hans-Gert Pöttering, Edward Snowden and Eugenio Scalfari.
