= Daryna Shevchenko =

Ukrainian journalist (born 1989)

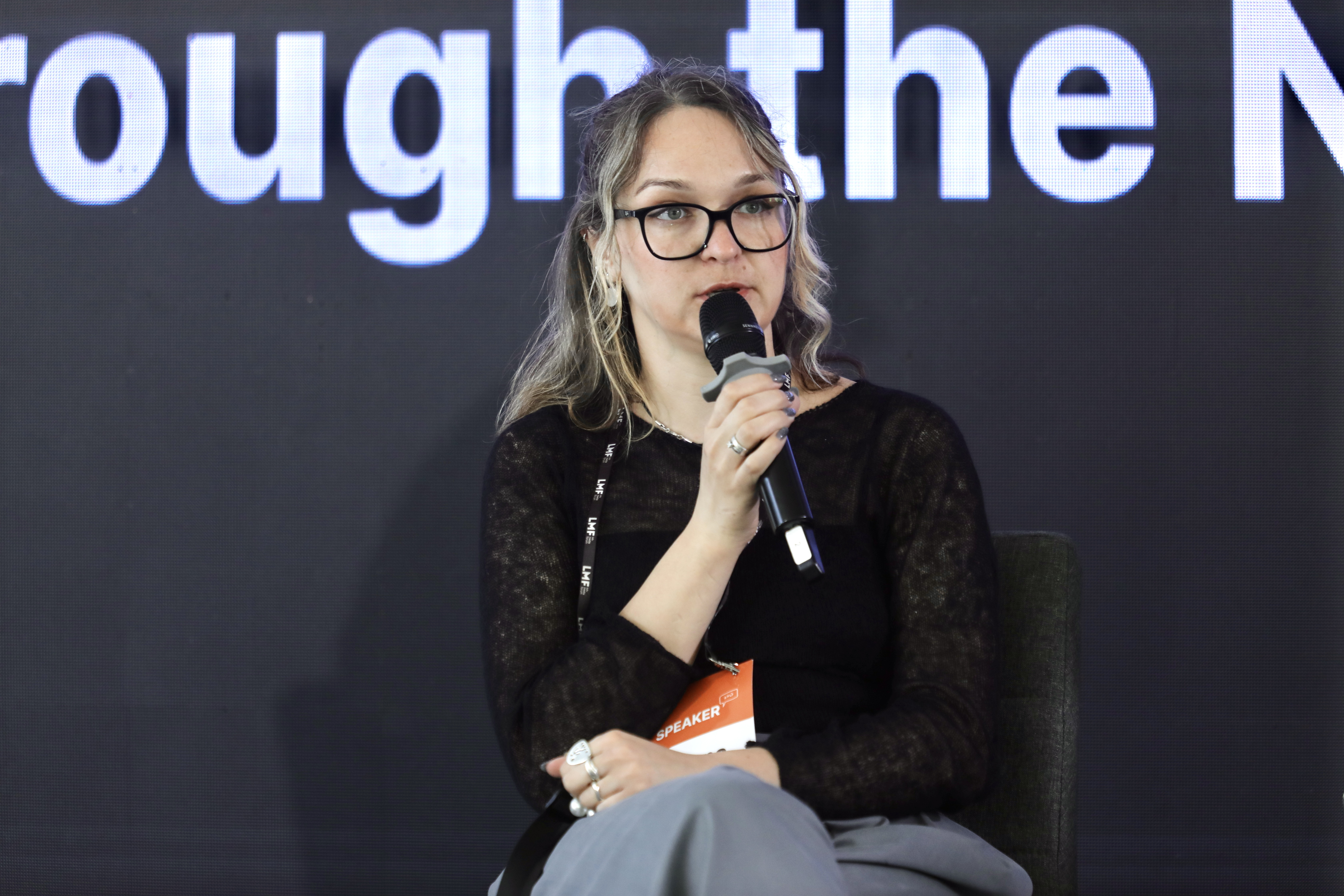
- Shevchenko in 2025
- Born: 23 July 1989 (age 36)
- Education: University of Chicago
- Occupation: CEO
- Employer: Kyiv Post (former)
- Known for: CEO of The Kyiv Independent newspaper since 2021

Daryna Oleksandrivna Shevchenko (Ukrainian: Дарина Олександрівна Шевченко; born 23 July 1989) has been the CEO of The Kyiv Independent newspaper since 2021. In February 2022 the newspaper suddenly attracted two million followers and crowdfunding as it reported on the invasion of Ukraine.

== Life ==
Shevchenko used to write about Ukrainian issues in English. In 2013 she was writing for the British Ukrainian Society as they held an event to improve relations.

She worked for the Kyiv Post, which was an English language newspaper until 2017. In 2021 the newspaper was suddenly closed and all of its staff lost their jobs.

Shevchenko and Jakub Parusinski together with others had created Jnomics Media in April 2019. She and Parusinski had both worked at the Kyiv Post and they organised themselves as CEO and chief finance officer of a new publication - The Kyiv Independent. Olga Rudenko was chosen as its new editor-in-chief as the Post's oldest editor, Brian Bonner, had decided to retire. She had been a deputy editor but was then a student on a scholarship from the University of Chicago.

When Russia invaded Ukraine on 24 February 2022, Shevchenko remained in Kyiv for ten days. She then moved west but continued to lead the newspaper. The publication suddenly became very important and the European Union gave them a grant to cover wages in the short term. The journalists gained scoops such as the aborted siege of the city of Chernihiv by the Russian army.

In April 2022 she was talking at the International Journalism Festival in the Italian town of Perugia. She did not volunteer to say where she had traveled from, for security reasons, but she spoke about her publication and the role other journalists couple play.

The newspaper attracted over two million followers, 7,000 patrons and it quickly raised £1.5m of crowdfunding. The magazine raises just $20,000 of advertising but it raises $70,000 on contributions each month, but Shevchenko has noticed that some supporters soon unsubscribed. Rudenko appeared on the cover of the double edition of Time magazine in May 2022.

Shevchenko identified that she needed to both invest the new money they had raised and recruit more journalists to ensure their future. In February 2024 she was again at the International Journalism Festival in Perugia, Italy talking about funding and the long term survival of independent journalism with Jakub Parusinski, Sue Valentine and Kelly Walls of the Guardian Foundation.
