= InterContinental Geneva =

Hotel in Geneva, Switzerland

InterContinental Geneva is a luxury hotel operated by InterContinental in Geneva, Switzerland.

Established in 1964, the InterContinental is located about 1 mile (1.6 km) to the west, near the United Nations headquarters. The hotel features 333 rooms and suites designed for comfort and tranquility in a modern environment. Styled by designer Tony Chi, the accommodations include ample natural light, balanced color schemes, and a contemporary aesthetic.

Over the years the hotel has hosted an elite clientele, including 400 heads of state, nearly 4,000 government ministers, many ambassadors, political figures, performing artists, and sports personalities. Guests have included Kofi Annan, Paul Biya, Bill and Hillary Clinton, Dennis Ross, Sophia Loren, and Roger Federer. On 9 May 1977, President Hafez al-Assad of Syria met with US President Jimmy Carter at the hotel to discuss the Arab–Israeli conflict and deadlocked Israeli-Syrian peace talk. In 1985 Mikhail Gorbachev and Ronald Reagan held a summit meeting at the hotel. World leaders like Javier Pérez de Cuéllar, Hosni Mubarak, and George H. W. Bush have also stayed at the hotel. It has also hosted many international conferences, including the IEEE International Conference on Communications in 1993.

== Location ==
The luxury hotel is located in Petit-Saconnex, a residential area in the northwestern part of the city, and has views of Mont Blanc and Lake Geneva. The Botanic Garden, United Nations (European Headquarters) and International Centre of Congress (CICG) are a three-minute walk from the hotel. The Palexpo Exhibition Centre and shopping mall are a five-minute drive away.

== History ==
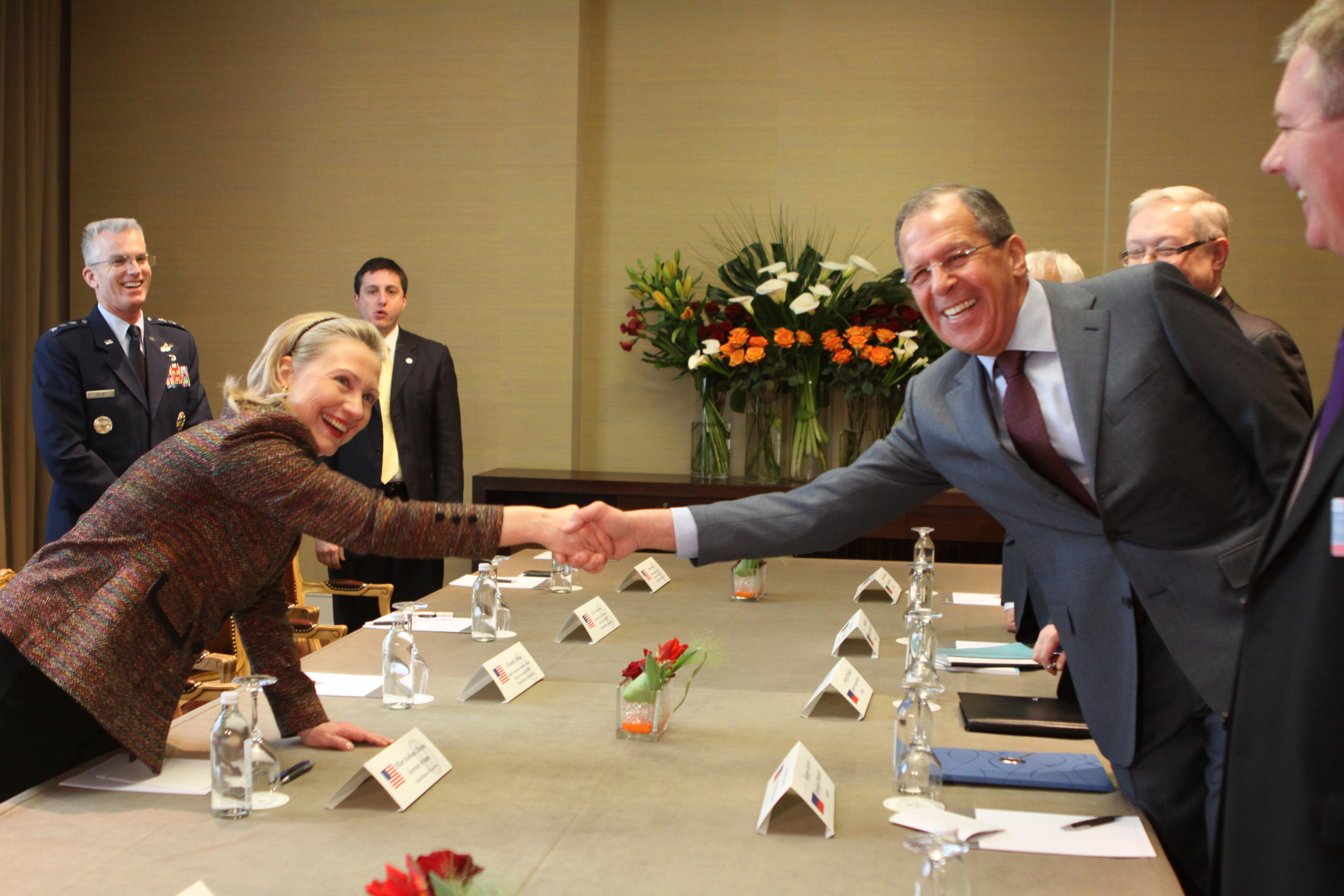
U.S. Secretary of State Hillary Clinton shakes hands with Russian Foreign Minister Sergey Lavrov at the InterContinental Geneva in 2011.

Over the years the hotel has hosted an elite clientele, including 400 heads of state, nearly 4,000 government ministers, many ambassadors, political figures, performing artists, and sports personalities. Guests have included Kofi Annan, Bill and Hillary Clinton, Dennis Ross, Sophia Loren, and Roger Federer. On 9 May 1977, President Hafez al-Assad of Syria met with US President Jimmy Carter at the hotel to discuss the Arab–Israeli conflict and deadlocked Israeli-Syrian peace talk. In 1985 Mikhail Gorbachev and Ronald Reagan held a summit meeting at the hotel. World leaders like Javier Pérez de Cuéllar, Hosni Mubarak, George H. W. Bush, and Joe Biden have also stayed at the hotel. It has also hosted many international conferences, including the IEEE International Conference on Communications in 1993.

The hotel, which was built in 1964, underwent a renovation which was completed in 2005 at a cost of €22 million. The renovations, designed by Tony Chi, have modernized the guest rooms and the foyer.

== Features ==
The 5-star luxury hotel is 18 stories high and has 333 guest rooms (233 single bed rooms and 94 double bed rooms), 56 suites, 16 meeting rooms and two restaurants (the pool side restaurant is heated during summer), apart from a Swiss wine lounge and a Spa.

The architecture and design of the hotel is a fusion of historical and classic modernism styles. The entrance façade has been redone, and the foyer of the hotel is now very large. The façade has a canopy with columns made of limestone. The doors are made of brass and large bamboo plants at the entrance give it a feeling of being even more spacious. The original reception area, which incorporated a shopping mall, was replaced with a Great Hall with "monumental columns and grand staircases." The Woods Restaurant, located near the entrance, has a custom-made table fashioned from tree trunks and the cabinets are also made of wood. In the Bar des Nations, the fireplace is double storied and made of limestone. The guest rooms are of contemporary design, and with subtle lighting, they provide views of Lake Geneva and the Alps.
