= 2026 United States–Ukraine–Russia meetings in Abu Dhabi =

2026 trilateral meetings in Abu Dhabi

- Host country: United Arab Emirates
- Date: 23–24 January 2026; 4–5 February 2026; 10–11 November 2026
- Cities: Abu Dhabi
- Venues: Al Shati Palace
- Participants: (United States) Steve Witkoff; (United States) Jared Kushner; (Ukraine) Rustem Umerov; (Ukraine) Kyrylo Budanov; (Russia) Igor Kostyukov; (Russia) Kirill Dmitriev

Key points
- Russo-Ukrainian war

The 2026 United States–Ukraine–Russia meetings in Abu Dhabi are a series of trilateral talks held in Abu Dhabi, United Arab Emirates, between delegations from the United States, Ukraine, and Russia in late January and early February, as well as in November 2026. The meetings, hosted by the government of the United Arab Emirates, and focused on parameters for ending the Russo-Ukrainian war, began on 23 January 2026 and continued on 24 January; a follow‑up round happened in 4 and 5 February 2026. The third round started on 10 November 2026. These were the first meetings between the three countries – the US, Russia and Ukraine – since the war started in February 2022.

== Background ==
News reports and official statements described the Abu Dhabi talks as the first publicly acknowledged trilateral meeting among the United States, Ukraine, and Russia since the major escalation of the war in 2022.

The meetings followed previous diplomatic contacts: Donald Trump and Volodymyr Zelenskyy had met on the sidelines of the World Economic Forum meeting, in Davos, Switzerland, and an American delegation including Steve Witkoff and Jared Kushner had met with Vladimir Putin, in Moscow, on the previous evening.

== Delegations and topics ==
Media reports and official communiqués identified delegations led by senior envoys and negotiators from the United States, Ukraine, and Russia, and noted participation by both political and military representatives. The American delegation included special envoy Steve Witkoff and Donald Trump's son-in-law Jared Kushner, the Ukrainian delegation included Zelenskyy's chief of staff Kyrylo Budanov and national security adviser Rustem Umerov, while the Russian delegation included the head of Russian military intelligence Admiral Igor Kostyukov and special envoy Kiril Dmitriev.

Public statements and reporting indicated the talks were convened to discuss parameters for ending the war. Multiple outlets highlighted the status of the Donbas region and related territorial questions as a point of the talks.

== Chronology ==
=== First round: 23–24 January 2026 ===
Delegations met on 23 January 2026 and discussions continued on 24 January 2026. Officials from the participating countries described the talks as focusing on negotiation parameters and the process for further discussions. US officials described the first round as very upbeat and constructive, and a UAE government spokesperson likewise noted a "positive and constructive atmosphere".

One of the main points of contention was Russia's demand that Ukraine withdraw from the parts of Donbas it still controlled and handed them over to Russia, which Ukraine did not accept. The situation at the Zaporizhzhia Nuclear Power Plant and who should control it was also discussed.

=== Intermediate developments ===
On 31 January 2026, and before the second round of negotiations in Abu Dhabi, the Russian envoy Kirill Dmitriev had a meeting in Miami with an American delegation: Steve Witkoff, Scott Bessent, Jared Kushner, and Josh Gruenbaum were present. No details of the talks were released, but Steve Witkoff said they were "productive and constructive".

On 3 February 2026, NATO's Secretary General Mark Rutte, made a surprise visit to Kyiv, where he met with Volodymyr Zelenskyy and also addressed Ukraine's parliament. On the previous night there was a massive attack against Ukraine and Rutte said that such actions showed that Russia was not serious about peace. Nevertheless, he added that "direct talks are now underway, and this is important progress". Rutte also said that some allied European countries would deploy troops to Ukraine as soon as peace was achieved, which would include "troops on the ground, jets in the air, and ships on the Black Sea", while the US would provide a security guarantee.

=== Second round: 4–5 February 2026 ===
A follow‑up round was scheduled for 4 and 5 February 2026. This meeting was initially scheduled for 1 February, but it was postponed due to developments in the crisis between the US and Iran regarding the Iranian nuclear program.

At the meeting on 4 February, Russia warned Ukraine that the war would continue unless it caved into its demands. Reportedly there was no shift in Russia's position since the previous round of negotiations. Territorial control remained the main issue, with Russia demanding the rest of Donbas it didn't control, namely about 20% of the Donetsk province, as well as the rest of the Kherson and Zaporizhzhia provinces, that it previously annexed de jure in full. In spite of this, Ukraine's envoy Rustem Umerov said the talks had been "substantive and productive, focused on concrete steps and practical solutions".

Zelenskyy had previously said the negotiations of the security guarantees with the Western allies had been concluded. The Coalition of the Willing would deploy troops to Ukraine once a ceasefire was reached, together with the US backing a military intervention if Russia repeatedly violated the ceasefire. However, Russia repeatedly rejected the presence of Western troops in Ukraine.

On 5 February, it was reported that Russia was also demanding the international recognition of the annexed territories as part of Russia. On this day it was concluded an agreement for the exchange of prisoners of war, which according to Zelenskyy was a "significant result" of the talks.

== Reactions and outcomes ==
One of the results of the talks was an agreement to exchange 314 prisoners of war, 157 from each side, which was the first prisoner exchange in five months. As of September 2025, over 2500 prisoners of war remained in Russian captivity.

Aside from the PoW exchange, at the conclusion of the two rounds of talks no formal agreement, ceasefire, or comprehensive settlement was announced by the parties. Ukrainian officials described the meetings as constructive while noting that political and territorial questions remained unresolved; statements from US and Russian sources characterized the discussions as constructive but emphasized that territorial issues were a key sticking point.

As the talks with Russia on stopping the war yielded no result and Russia insisted on the war to continue, the EU and the US prepared new sanctions against Russia. The EU prepared new sanctions against Russia's shadow oil tanker fleet, while the US had already sanctioned the Russian companies Rosneft and Lukoil in October 2025. Western sanctions against the Russian oil and gas had significant effects, with Russian oil and gas revenues falling 22% in the first eleven months of 2025.

On 6 February 2026, the EU announced its 20th package of sanctions against Russia. The sanctions included a full ban on maritime services for oil targeting 43 more ships of the Russian shadow oil tanker fleet. The sanctions also introduced new import bans targeting metals, chemicals, and critical minerals. They also expanded export restrictions on items and technologies that could support Russia's military efforts, including materials used to manufacture explosives. The package added 20 additional Russian regional banks to the sanctions list. Several banks in third countries were also targeted for allegedly helping facilitate trade in sanctioned goods.

Steve Witkoff said that "discussions will continue, with additional progress anticipated in the coming weeks".

== See also ==
- Peace negotiations in the Russo-Ukrainian war
- United States and the Russo-Ukrainian war
