= The Kyiv Independent =

English-language Ukrainian media outlet

- The Kyiv Independent staff meet UK Foreign Secretary in 2026
- Format: Online
- Editor-in-chief: Olga Rudenko
- Chief executive officer: Daryna Shevchenko
- Founded: November 11, 2021
- Language: English
- City: Kyiv
- Country: Ukraine
- Website: kyivindependent.com

The Kyiv Independent is an English-language Ukrainian online newspaper founded in November 2021—three months before the 2022 Russian invasion of Ukraine—by former staff of the Kyiv Post and the media consultancy company Jnomics Media. It is active on Twitter, Bluesky and Reddit. In October 2021, disputes arose between the owner of the Kyiv Post and journalists at the newspaper believed that even under the presidency of Volodymyr Zelenskyy, their critical reporting was adversely affecting the business of the owner.

The Kyiv Independent was supported by an emergency grant of 200,000 dollars from the Canadian government. In early February 2022, the newspaper began running advertisements and published its first commercial articles on its website. However, the invasion of Ukraine brought the newspaper's commercial activities to a halt. It previously received funding from USAID but now receives the majority of its funding from subscriptions from readers, of which there were over 18,000 by May 2025.

== Description ==
The Kyiv Independent is an English-language Ukrainian online newspaper founded in November 2021—three months before the 2022 Russian invasion of Ukraine—by former staff of the Kyiv Post and the media consultancy company Jnomics Media. The online newspaper is active on Twitter, Bluesky and Reddit.

== Background ==
In October 2021, disputes arose between the owner and employees of the Kyiv Post. Journalists at the newspaper believed that even under the presidency of Volodymyr Zelenskyy, their previous critical reporting was adversely affecting the business of the owner, who had bought the barely-profitable newspaper from the Ukrainian-based businessman Mohammad Zahoor in March 2018, and invested considerable funds in it. The owner of the Kyiv Post at the time was the Syrian-born investor Adnan Kivan. Brian Bonner, the former chief executive officer of the Kyiv Post, said in April 2022 that the newspaper's "fragmentary reporting" had brought it into conflict with every Ukrainian government it dealt with so far, including Zelensky's. According to Bonner, Zelenskyy had tried to portray himself as a reformer to Western governments, and alleged that critical reporting had been seen as undermining that message. The government, Bonner said, had begun to lean on Kivan, who had seen ownership of a "crusading media outlet" as more trouble than it was worth:

The president's office denies it, the prosecutor's office denies it, Kivan denies it - but I know we were under pressure ... The Kyiv Post survived [former presidents] Kuchma, Yushchenko, Yanukovych, and Poroshenko, but died under Zelenskyy. That was a big surprise to me.

Olga Rudenko, deputy editor-in-chief, told Euromaidan Press that Kivan had received "signals of discontent" from the government. Rudenko saw this as confirmation of rumors "that pressure from the presidential administration may have been a reason for the abrupt silence of an important international voice in Ukraine."

Kivan wanted to start a new Ukrainian- and Russian-language edition with a team selected by him without consulting the editorial board. On October 14, the editorial staff learned from a Facebook message by Olena Rotari (editor-in-chief of Kanal Odesa 7) that she was preparing a Ukrainian edition of the Kyiv Post as its new editor and was hiring a full editorial staff for it. Parts of the editorial board feared Kivan would "use the good name she has built up to create, in Ukrainian and Russian, 'a replica publication that would publish articles intended to serve the owner's interest.'"

Journalists of the Kyiv Post saw this as an encroachment on their editorial freedom originally promised to them by Kivan and asked him, with the support of PEN Ukraine, to either give them influence over the new publication, sell the paper, or transfer the paper's label to the editorial board. Kivan subsequently closed the newspaper on November 8, 2021, and dismissed all staff, which was seen as a renewed attack on editorial freedom and an "act of revenge."

The renewed Kyiv Post resumed work after three weeks in December 2021 with a largely new editorial team. The CEO position was filled by Luc Chenier in succession to Bonner, who had retired. Chenier sought to make the new edition "a publication that tells a more positive story about Ukraine. It was a new tone, he said, advertisers would be more willing to support it. Many people, he said, told him they had stopped reading the old Kyiv Post because the newspaper had become too depressing with its "relentless focus on corruption and government abuses."

Negative news keeps coming out of Ukraine. I've been here for 21 years and I know that this is just a small drop of what Ukraine is ... We are the global voice of Ukraine - not the corruption voice of Ukraine.

== Founding ==
30 of the 50 laid-off staff members of the editorial team of the Kyiv Post founded the Kyiv Independent three days after its closure, on November 11, 2021. The journalists expressed their point of view, they did not believe that there would continue to be an independent Kyiv Post and therefore wanted to establish a new publication. The publication was publicly announced on November 15, and the first issue appeared on November 22. By November 25, its Patreon account already had 500 subscribers, by early December it had 655 subscribers, who collectively contributed $10,000 a month.

The team of editors and journalists joined with media managers from Jnomics Media, a Kyiv and London-based consultancy founded on April 17, 2019, by Jakub Parusinski and Daryna Shevchenko, both of whom had worked at the Kyiv Post between 2011 and 2017. The team unanimously chose Olga Rudenko, the former deputy editor-in-chief of the Kyiv Post, as editor-in-chief of the new publication, even though Rudenko was currently a scholarship student at the University of Chicago. Daryna Shevchenko, a partner at Jnomics Media, and Jakub Parusinski, a managing partner at that consulting firm, became CEO and CFO of the new company.

On day one, the team launched its first editorial product, a daily newsletter Ukraine Daily, which has since landed in subscribers' inboxes five days a week. Very early on, detailed reports on the Russian troop buildup on Ukraine's borders dominated the news feeds. "Opinion columns analyze Vladimir Putin's motives and the West's reactions, and politics and corruption remain regular content." Rudenko expressed, Ukraine needs high-quality news portals like the Kyiv Post used to have "to counter the Russian narrative."

The Kyiv Independent pledged to be partially owned by its journalists and stated that it would not "serve a wealthy owner or oligarch."

== Funding ==
The Kyiv Independent was supported by an emergency grant of 200,000 Canadian dollars from the Canadian government. Ashley Mulroney, the director of the Ukrainian Development Program at the Canadian Embassy in Kyiv, expressed that the grant, distributed through the European Endowment for Democracy, was "part of broader Canadian support for free media and democratization in Ukraine." Crowdfunding was initially also major source of funding for the publication. By March 6, 2022, not long after the full-scale Russian invasion of Ukraine, the Independent's GoFundMe campaign had reached nearly £1.2 million.

In early February 2022, the Kyiv Independent began running advertisements and published its first commercial articles on its website. However, Russia's war against Ukraine and its economic impact temporarily brought all commercial activities to a halt.

The Kyiv Independent previously received some funding from USAID in 2022 and 2023, but now receives the majority of its funding from readers who pledge to contribute financially on a monthly or yearly basis. Those who pledge regular contributions are called members. By May 2025, the Kyiv Independent had over 18,000 members. Members receive benefits like Q&As with journalists, ad-free reading on the website, and a discount to the online store.

In 2025, when other Ukrainian media outlets were hit by the USAID freeze, the Kyiv Independent launched a crowdfunding campaign to support three local outlets. The fundraiser gathered over $66,200 for Tsukr, based in Sumy, Gwara Media, from Kharkiv, and MykVisti, from Mykolaiv.

== Staff ==
Senior staff members are:

- Daryna Shevchenko - who worked for Kyiv Post, became Chief Executive Officer of Kyiv Independent
- Olga Rudenko - Editor-in-Chief
- Jakub Parusinski - Director of KI Insights.
- Zakhar Protsiuk - Chief Operating Officer
- Oleksiy Sorokin - Deputy Chief Editor
- Toma Istomina - Deputy Chief Editor
- Yevhenia Motorevska - head of War Crimes Investigations Unit

Daryna Shevchenko has 10 years of experience as a media manager, trainer and media consultant. After working at Kyiv Post, she first became the executive director of the Media Development Foundation, then took over the investigative journalism department at ZIK television station. In the process, she worked as an executive producer of the investigative media Slidstvo.Info. Finally, she joined Jnomics Media Consulting as a partner.

Jakub Parusinski is a former journalist and media manager with more than 10 years of experience managing projects in the media sector. He wrote for the Financial Times and The Economist and was editor-in-chief and then CEO of the Kyiv Post from 2013 to 2014. Under his leadership, the Kyiv Post received the Medal of Honor for Outstanding Journalistic Achievement from the Missouri School of Journalism. After earning his master's degree in business administration from INSEAD, he worked at McKinsey from 2015 to 2018 with representatives of the banking, pharmaceutical, construction, and telecommunications industries, as well as with the public sector. Key areas of focus were projects in digital strategy, advanced analytics and Change Management. He is Editor-at-Large of TheFix and chairs the board of the Media Development Foundation (MDF). MDF runs one of the largest internship programs for young journalists in Europe, as well as accelerator programs to support CEE media. He is also Managing Partner of Jnomics Media, "which helps media in the CEE region build sustainable operating models and acts as an advisor to several startups in the communications sector." Jakub Parusinski is the Director of KI Insights.

The newspaper sees work on social media as an important focus, highlighting that their social media team comes from both Ukraine and abroad. "We have native English speakers working for us, who bring a lot of positive things: high journalistic standards, good storytelling, first-class English," Shevchenko said.

== Russian invasion of Ukraine ==
The Kyiv Independent became known for its reporting during the Russian invasion of Ukraine. After the initial invasion, Kyiv Independent's Twitter follower count increased by over one million. Due to the Russian assault on Kyiv, most of the staff left the Kyiv Independent headquarters for security reasons; three veteran war reporters stayed behind.

CEO Daryna Shevchenko remained in Kyiv until mid-March 2022. Other staff moved to other locations:

"Some of our foreign staff fled to their home countries because their governments evacuated them. The rest of us are spread across Kyiv, central Ukraine and western Ukraine. Some are working less at the moment because they have to take care of their families, have no access to the Internet or spend most of their time in the bunker. But no employee has stopped working for us because of the war."

On March 1, 2022, Ursula von der Leyen quoted from a Kyiv Independent editorial in her speech at the European Parliament plenary session on Russia's aggression against Ukraine.

The Kyiv Independent established its own team in 2023 to investigate Russian war crimes. In July 2023, it published the documentary film Uprooted: An Investigation into Russia's Abduction of Ukrainian Children.

== Awards ==
In December 2021, Ukrainska Pravda honored The Kyiv Independent team with its Journalists of the Year award, shortly after they were established in November — the same month they were fired from the Kyiv Post.

The Kyiv Independent won several awards for its reportage of the war in Ukraine, including the Free Media Pioneer Award, the Fleischaker/Greene Award, a special recognition from the Arthur Ross Media Awards, the #AllForJan Award, the George Weidenfeld Prize, the European Press Prize, the Kurt Schork Award, the Bayeux Calvados-Normandy Prize, and the Bonnier Award.

In 2022, The Kyiv Independent was given the Médaille Charlemagne for "ma[king] a significant contribution to the process of European unification and the development of a European identity in the media field." Four The Kyiv Independent reporters — Anastasiia Lapatina, Anna Myroniuk, Oleksiy Sorokin, and Toma Istomina — were featured in the Forbes 30 Under 30 Europe List for 2022. The Kyiv Independent received the Washington DC based Transatlantic Leadership Network 2022 "Freedom of the Media" Gold Medal award for Investigative Reporting awarded to a foreign news organization or individual. Olga Rudenko, editor-in-chief of The Kyiv Independent, was presented with the Woman of Europe Award in 2022, winning in the Woman in Action category.

Rudenko won the Hanns-Joachim Friedrichs Award in 2023. In September 2023, The Kyiv Independent was conferred the Future of Media Award for audience growth by the Press Gazette. The Kyiv Independent's 2023 documentary film, Uprooted, and the reporter who worked on it, Olesia Bida, won the Proxy Prize. The film won the IRE award, and the Bucha Journalism Conference Prize the following year. In March 2025, as part of their Global Media Awards, the International News Media Association chose The Kyiv Independent's Travel Show as one of the winners for the Best New Video Product or Feature category.

== See also ==
- Human rights in Ukraine
- Illia Ponomarenko
- Mass media in Ukraine
