= Blood agent =

Type of toxic chemical agent

A blood agent is a toxic chemical agent that affects the body by being absorbed into the blood. Blood agents are fast-acting, potentially lethal poisons that typically manifest at room temperature as volatile colorless gases with a faint odor. They are either cyanide- or arsenic-based.

== Exposure ==
Blood agents work through inhalation or ingestion. As chemical weapons, blood agents are typically disseminated as aerosols and take effect through inhalation. Due to their volatility, they are more toxic in confined areas than in open areas.

Cyanide compounds occur in small amounts in the natural environment and in cigarette smoke. They are also used in several industrial processes and as pesticides. Cyanides are released when synthetic fabrics or polyurethane burn, and may thus contribute to fire-related deaths. Arsine gas, formed when arsenic encounters an acid, is used as a pesticide and in the semiconductor industry; most exposures to it occur accidentally in the workplace.

== Symptoms ==
The symptoms of blood agent poisoning depend on concentration and duration.

Cyanide-based blood agents irritate the eyes and the respiratory tract, while arsine is nonirritating. Hydrogen cyanide has a faint, bitter, almond odor that only about half of all people can smell. Arsine has a very faint garlic odor detectable only at greater than fatal concentrations.

Exposure to small amounts of cyanide has no effect. Higher concentrations cause dizziness, weakness and nausea, which cease with the exposure, but long-term exposure can cause mild symptoms followed by permanent brain damage and muscle paralysis. Moderate exposure causes stronger and longer-lasting symptoms, including headache, that can be followed by convulsions and coma. Stronger or longer exposure will also lead to convulsions and coma. Very strong exposure causes severe toxic effects within seconds, and rapid death.

The blood of people killed by blood agents is bright red, because the agents inhibit the use of the oxygen in it by the body's cells. Cyanide poisoning can be detected by the presence of thiocyanate or cyanide in the blood, a smell of bitter almonds, or respiratory tract inflammations and congestions in the case of cyanogen chloride poisoning. There is no specific test for arsine poisoning, but it may leave a garlic smell on the victim's breath.

== Effects ==
At sufficient concentrations, blood agents can quickly saturate the blood and cause death in a matter of minutes or seconds. They cause powerful gasping for breath, violent convulsions and a painful death that can take several minutes. The immediate cause of death is usually respiratory failure.

Blood agents work at the cellular level by preventing the exchange of oxygen and carbon dioxide between the blood and the body's cells. This causes the cells to suffocate from lack of oxygen. Cyanide-based agents do so by interrupting the electron transport chain in the inner membranes of mitochondria. Arsine damages the red blood cells which deliver oxygen throughout the body.

== Detection and countermeasures ==
Chemical detection methods, in the form of kits or testing strips, exist for hydrogen cyanide. Ordinary clothing provides some protection, but proper protective clothing and masks are recommended. Mask filters containing only charcoal are ineffective, and effective filters are quickly saturated.

Due to their high volatility, cyanide agents generally need no decontamination. In enclosed areas, fire extinguishers spraying sodium carbonate can decontaminate hydrogen cyanide, but the resulting metal salts remain poisonous on contact. Liquid hydrogen cyanide can be flushed with water.

Cyanide poisoning can be treated with antidotes.

== List of blood agents ==
The information in the following table, which lists blood agents of military significance, is taken from Ledgard. The values given are on a scale from 1 to 10.

| Agent | Description | Melting / boiling point | Effectiveness as blood agent | Persistence, open area | Persistence, enclosed area | Field stability | Storage stability | Toxicity as blood agent |
|---|---|---|---|---|---|---|---|---|
| Hydrogen cyanide | Colorless gas or liquid, almond odor, burns with a bluish flame. | −13 / 26 °C | 10 | 2 | 9 | 10 | 8 | 10 |
| Cyanogen | Colorless gas, almond odor, burns with a pinkish flame having a blue border. | −28 / −21 °C | 9 | 2 | 9 | 8 | 7 | 9 |
| Cyanogen chloride | Colorless gas or liquid, pungent and biting odor, soluble in water and alcohol. | −6 / 14 °C | 8 | 3 | 9 | 9 | 9 | 8 |
| Cyanogen bromide | Colorless needle-shaped or cubic crystals, tending to volatilize on standing, hence of limited usefulness as a weapon. | 52 / 62 °C | 9 | 5 | 8 | 5 | 6 | 8 |
| Arsine | Colorless gas, garlic-like odor, slightly soluble in water. | −117 / −62 °C | 9 | 3 | 8 | 5 | 9 | 9 |
| Vinyl arsine | Colorless liquid, irritating and bitter odor, slightly soluble in water, also acts as a blister agent. | 124 °C (boiling) | 7 | 7 | 9 | 8 | 9 | 6 |
| Phosgene | Colorless gas and slightly yellow liquid, moldy hay odor, slightly soluble in water and soluble in most solvents, also acts as a choking agent. | −118 / 8 | 10 | 6 | 9 | 5 | 8 | 6 |

Sodium cyanide and potassium cyanide, colorless crystalline compounds similar in appearance to sugar, also act as blood agents. Carbon monoxide could technically be called a blood agent because it binds with oxygen-carrying hemoglobin in the blood (see carbon monoxide poisoning), but its high volatility makes it impractical as a chemical warfare agent.

One of the earliest proposed chemical weapons, cacodyl oxide, or Cadet's fuming liquid, also displays properties of a blood agent (as well as those of a malodorant). It was proposed as a chemical weapon in the British Empire during the Crimean War, along with the significantly more potent blood agent, cacodyl cyanide.

== Use ==
The most significant practical application of blood agents was the use of hydrogen cyanide (Zyklon B) in gas chambers by Nazi Germany to commit the mass murder of Jews and others in the course of the Holocaust. This resulted in the largest death toll as a result of the use of chemical agents to date.
