= Lithium arsenate =

Names
- Other names Trilithium arsenate

Identifiers
CAS Number	13478-14-3
3D model (JSmol)	Interactive image
ChemSpider	145960
ECHA InfoCard	100.033.416
EC Number	236-773-8
PubChem CID	166828
CompTox Dashboard (EPA)	DTXSID801070284
- InChI: InChI=1S/AsH3O4.3Li/c2-1(3,4)5;;;/h(H3,2,3,4,5);;;/q;3*+1/p-3 Key: VKJKOXNPYVUXNC-UHFFFAOYSA-K
- SMILES: [Li+].[Li+].[Li+].[O-][As](=O)([O-])[O-]

Properties
Chemical formula	Li_{3}AsO_{4}
Molar mass	159.75 g/mol
Appearance	Colorless crystalline solid
Solubility in water	Sparingly soluble in water

Structure
Crystal structure	Orthorhombic (low-temperature form)
Space group	Pmn2_{1}
- Except where otherwise noted, data are given for materials in their standard state (at 25 °C [77 °F], 100 kPa). Infobox references

Lithium arsenate is an inorganic compound of lithium and the arsenate ion, with the formula Li_{3}AsO_{4}. It is a colorless crystalline solid that is only sparingly soluble in water. Several crystalline polymorphs are known, including low-temperature and high-temperature orthorhombic forms.

== Preparation ==
Lithium arsenate can be prepared by precipitation from aqueous solutions containing lithium and arsenate ions:

3 Li^{+} + AsO^{3−}_{4} → Li_{3}AsO_{4}↓

It can also be prepared by complete neutralization of arsenic acid with lithium hydroxide:

3 LiOH + H_{3}AsO_{4} → Li_{3}AsO_{4} + 3 H_{2}O

== Properties ==
=== Crystal structure and polymorphism ===
Lithium arsenate is polymorphic. The low-temperature form crystallizes in the orthorhombic crystal system, with lattice parameters approximately a = 6.27 Å, b = 5.38 Å, c = 4.95 Å.

This phase is closely related to the low-temperature forms of Li_{3}PO_{4} and Li_{3}VO_{4}.

A second orthorhombic modification occurs at elevated temperature, with approximate lattice parameters

a = 6.28 Å
b = 10.76 Å
c = 5.05 Å.

The low- and high-temperature structures are closely related. In both, arsenic occurs in isolated AsO_{4} tetrahedra and lithium is approximately tetrahedrally coordinated by oxygen.

A later structural refinement assigned the low-temperature phase to space group Pmn2_{1}, with lattice parameters approximately a = 6.286 Å, b = 5.390 Å and c = 4.962 Å.

=== High-temperature phase ===
At still higher temperature, Li_{3}AsO_{4} forms a γ-phase related to γ-Li_{3}PO_{4}.

Neutron-diffraction measurements at 770 and 850 °C showed that the γ-phase consists of a distorted hexagonal close-packed array of oxygen atoms in which half of the tetrahedral sites are occupied by lithium and arsenic.

The lithium sublattice becomes substantially disordered at high temperature. One lithium site splits into central and off-centre positions within its tetrahedron, while another lithium species becomes distributed over pairs of face-sharing tetrahedral sites at 850 °C.

The increased lithium disorder is characteristic of the high-temperature phase and is responsible for significant structural differences from the lower-temperature modifications.

=== Solubility ===
Lithium arsenate is only sparingly soluble in water, in contrast to the corresponding sodium and potassium arsenates.

It is soluble in acidic media such as aqueous acetic acid.

== Safety ==
Lithium arsenate is toxic because it contains pentavalent arsenic. Soluble or bioavailable inorganic arsenic compounds can cause serious acute and chronic health effects.
