= Tripotassium arsenate =

Names
- Other names: Potassium arsenate; Tripotassium orthoarsenate

Identifiers
CAS Number	13464-36-3
3D model (JSmol)	Interactive image
ChemSpider	11646312
EC Number	232-065-8
PubChem CID	14178438
CompTox Dashboard (EPA)	DTXSID40928698
- InChI: InChI=1S/AsH3O4.3K/c2-1(3,4)5;;;/h(H3,2,3,4,5);;;/q;3*+1/p-3 Key: QLFYYVADGRLXQS-UHFFFAOYSA-K
- SMILES: [K+].[K+].[K+].[O-][As](=O)([O-])[O-]

Properties
Chemical formula	K_{3}AsO_{4}
Molar mass	256.21 g/mol
Appearance	Colorless crystalline solid
Density	3.34 g/cm^{3} (calculated)
Solubility in water	Soluble in water

Structure
Crystal structure	Orthorhombic
Space group	Cccm, No. 66
Lattice constant	a = 1.06011 nm, b = 1.13521 nm, c = 1.69401 nm
Formula units (Z)	16
- Except where otherwise noted, data are given for materials in their standard state (at 25 °C [77 °F], 100 kPa). Infobox references

Tripotassium arsenate, is an inorganic compound with the formula K_{3}AsO_{4}. It is the normal potassium salt of arsenic acid and consists of potassium ions and isolated arsenate, AsO^{3−}_{4}, tetrahedra. It is a colorless, water-soluble crystalline solid.

== Preparation ==
Tripotassium arsenate can be prepared by complete neutralization of arsenic acid with potassium hydroxide:

3 KOH + H_{3}AsO_{4} → K_{3}AsO_{4} + 3 H_{2}O

It can also be obtained by reacting arsenic acid with excess potassium carbonate.

Anhydrous K_{3}AsO_{4} has additionally been synthesized by oxidation of elemental arsenic with potassium superoxide under high-temperature solid-state conditions.

Tripotassium arsenate can also form during oxidative alkaline treatment of arsenic-containing minerals such as arsenopyrite. In the presence of potassium carbonate and oxygen, arsenic may be converted into K_{3}AsO_{4} while iron and sulfur are oxidized to iron oxide and sulfur dioxide.

== Properties ==
=== Crystal structure ===
Tripotassium arsenate crystallizes in the orthorhombic crystal system, space group Cccm (No. 66).

Single-crystal diffraction gives lattice parameters a = 10.6011 Å, b = 11.3521 Å, c = 16.9401 Å with sixteen formula units per unit cell.

The structure contains isolated AsO^{3−}_{4} tetrahedra, with As–O distances of approximately 1.67–1.71 Å. These tetrahedra and the potassium ions form a nearly cubic close-packed arrangement.

The calculated crystallographic density is approximately 3.34 g/cm^{3}.

=== Reactions ===
Addition of silver nitrate to an aqueous solution of potassium arsenate precipitates reddish-brown silver arsenate:

K_{3}AsO_{4} + 3 AgNO_{3} → Ag_{3}AsO_{4}↓ + 3 KNO_{3}

This precipitation reaction was historically used as a qualitative test for arsenate ions.

Under acidic conditions arsenate can be reduced to arsenite by iodide, with liberation of iodine. The underlying redox process can be represented ionically as:

AsO^{3−}_{4} + 2 I^{−} + 2 H^{+} → AsO^{3−}_{3} + I_{2} + H_{2}O

=== Acid salts ===
Partial neutralization of arsenic acid gives acidic potassium arsenates such as dipotassium arsenate, K_{2}HAsO_{4}, and monopotassium arsenate, KH_{2}AsO_{4}. These are distinct compounds from the fully neutralized K_{3}AsO_{4}.

== Safety ==
Tripotassium arsenate is toxic because it contains pentavalent arsenic. Exposure to soluble inorganic arsenic compounds can cause serious acute and chronic health effects.

== See also ==
- Arsenic acid
- Monopotassium arsenate
- Dipotassium arsenate
- Silver arsenate
- Arsenate
- Arsenite
