= Potassium arsenate =

Potassium arsenate usually refers to tripotassium arsenate K_{3}AsO_{4} but may also refer to:

- Monopotassium arsenate, KH_{2}AsO_{4}
- Dipotassium arsenate, K_{2}HAsO_{4}

== See also ==
- Potassium arsenite (KAsO_{2})
