= Bis(trifluoromethyl) disulfide =

Names
- Other names Hexafluorodimethyl disulfide TFD

Identifiers
CAS Number	372-64-5
3D model (JSmol)	Interactive image
ChemSpider	61112
PubChem CID	67795
CompTox Dashboard (EPA)	DTXSID4073172
- InChI: InChI=1S/C2F6S2/c3-1(4,5)9-10-2(6,7)8 Key: CGMFFOXAQVRUAZ-UHFFFAOYSA-N
- SMILES: C(F)(F)(F)SSC(F)(F)F

Properties
Chemical formula	C_{2}F_{6}S_{2}
Molar mass	202.13 g·mol^{−1}
Appearance	Liquid
Boiling point	35 °C (95 °F; 308 K)
- Except where otherwise noted, data are given for materials in their standard state (at 25 °C [77 °F], 100 kPa). Infobox references

Bis(trifluoromethyl) disulfide (TFD) is a fluorinated organosulfur compound that was used as a fumigant. It is also an intermediate in the synthesis of triflic acid. It is a volatile liquid that is extremely toxic by inhalation.

== Synthesis ==
TFD can be produced by reaction of perchloromethyl mercaptan or thiophosgene with sodium fluoride.

== Toxicity ==
TFD is extremely toxic by inhalation. TFD is a powerful pulmonary agent that can cause severe pulmonary edema. TFD is about half as toxic as perfluoroisobutene.

== See also ==
- Dimethyl(trifluoromethylthio)arsine
- Perchloromethyl mercaptan
- Thiophosgene
- Perfluoroisobutene
- Phosgene
