= Samarium(III) arsenate =

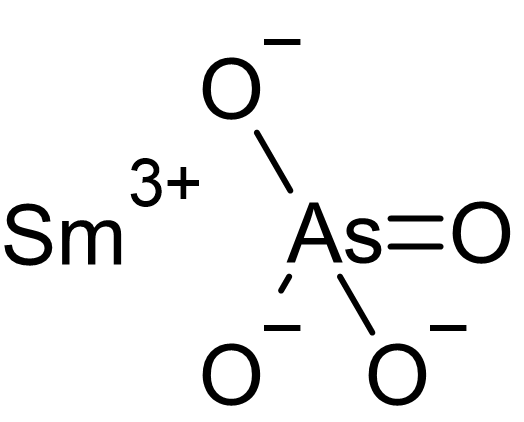

Identifiers
CAS Number	15479-87-5
3D model (JSmol)	Interactive image
ChemSpider	21428578
PubChem CID	25022139
- InChI: InChI=1S/AsH3O4.Sm/c2-1(3,4)5;/h(H3,2,3,4,5);/q;+3/p-3 Key: PHVYCYGJDQEMIH-UHFFFAOYSA-K
- SMILES: [O-][As](=O)([O-])[O-].[Sm+3]

Properties
Chemical formula	SmAsO_{4}
Appearance	light yellow crystals
Density	5.77 g/cm^{3}
Solubility in water	Insoluble
- Except where otherwise noted, data are given for materials in their standard state (at 25 °C [77 °F], 100 kPa). Infobox references

Samarium(III) arsenate is an arsenate salt of samarium with the chemical formula SmAsO_{4}. It has good thermal stability, and its pK_{sp,c} is 22.73±0.08.

== Preparation ==
Samarium(III) arsenate can be produced by reacting sodium arsenate (Na_{3}AsO_{4}) and samarium(III) chloride (SmCl_{3}) in solution:

Na_{3}AsO_{4} + SmCl_{3} → 3 NaCl + SmAsO_{4}↓
