= Cacodyl cyanide =

- Skeletal formula

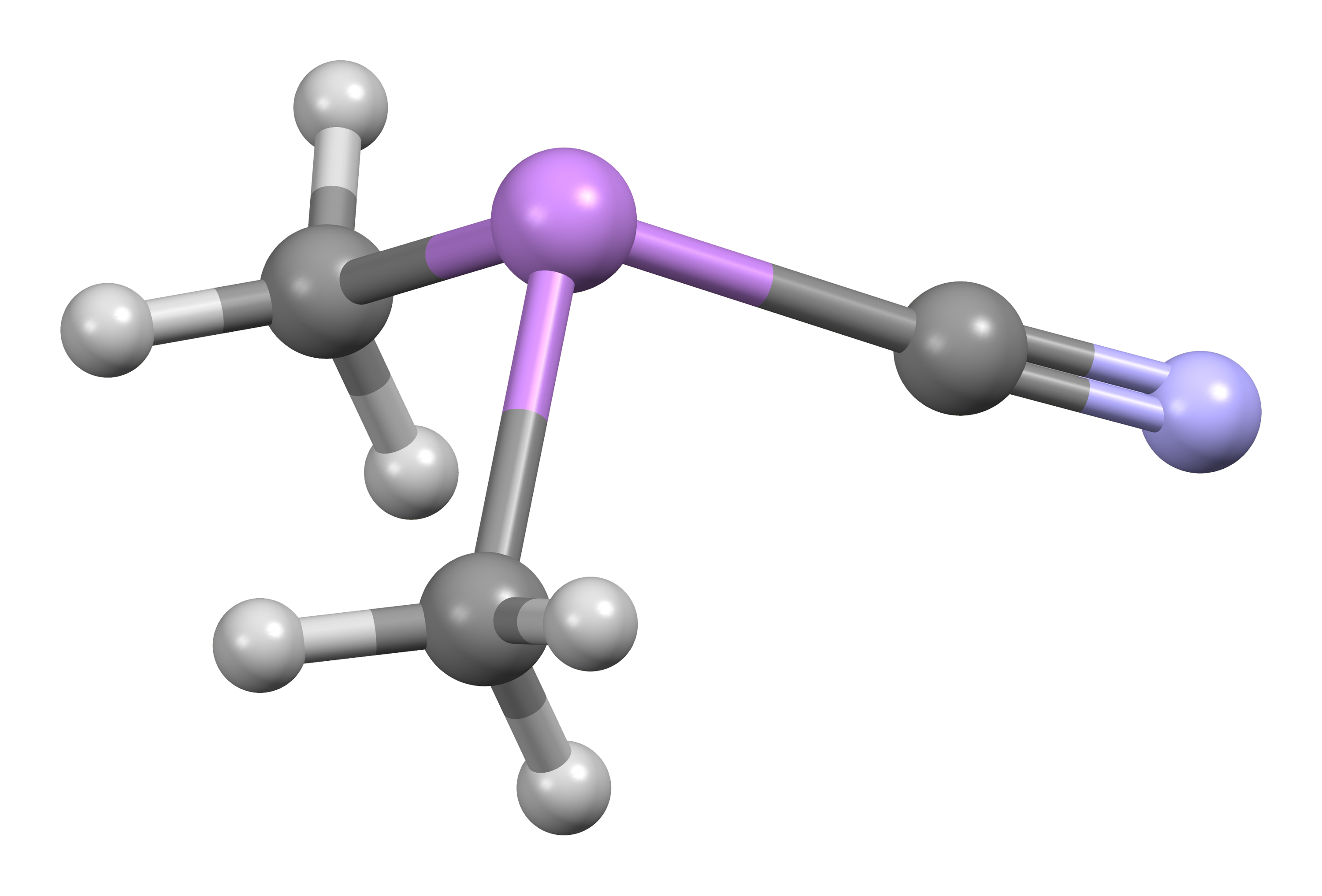
- Ball-and-stick model based on crystallography

Names
- Preferred IUPAC name Dimethylarsinous cyanide
- Other names Cyanodimethylarsine; Dimethylcyanoarsine; Cyanide of cacodyl

Identifiers
CAS Number	683-45-4
3D model (JSmol)	Interactive image
ChemSpider	12169
PubChem CID	12690
RTECS number	CH2100000
CompTox Dashboard (EPA)	DTXSID50218451
- InChI: InChI=1S/C3H6AsN/c1-4(2)3-5/h1-2H3 Key: BXASHBJZPLFFPH-UHFFFAOYSA-N
- SMILES: C[As](C)C#N

Properties
Chemical formula	C_{3}H_{6}AsN
Molar mass	131.010 g·mol^{−1}
Appearance	White solid
Melting point	33 °C (91 °F; 306 K)
Boiling point	140 °C (284 °F; 413 K)
Solubility in water	Slightly soluble
Solubility	Very soluble in alcohol and ether

Hazards
- Occupational safety and health (OHS/OSH)
Main hazards	Extremely toxic
- Except where otherwise noted, data are given for materials in their standard state (at 25 °C [77 °F], 100 kPa). Infobox references

Cacodyl cyanide is a highly toxic organoarsenic compound discovered by Robert Bunsen in the 1840s. It is very volatile and flammable, as it shares the chemical properties of both arsenic and hydrogen cyanide.

== Synthesis ==
Cacodyl cyanide can be prepared by reaction of cacodyl oxide with mercuric cyanide.

== Properties ==
Cacodyl cyanide is a white solid that is only slightly soluble in water, but very soluble in alcohol and ether.

Cacodyl cyanide is highly toxic, producing symptoms of both cyanide and arsenic poisoning. Bunsen described it in the following terms;

This substance is extraordinarily poisonous, and for this reason its preparation and purification can only be carried on in the open air; indeed, under these circumstances, it is necessary for the operator to breathe through a long open tube so as to insure the inspiration of air free from impregnation with any trace of the vapor of this very volatile compound. If only a few grains of this substance be allowed to evaporate in a room at the ordinary temperature, the effect upon any one inspiring the air is that of sudden giddiness and insensibility, amounting to complete unconsciousness.

It is also quite explosive, and Bunsen himself was severely injured in the course of his experiments with cacodyl cyanide. The Russian military tested cacodyl cyanide on cats as a potential chemical weapon for filling shells in late 1850s. While it was found to be a potent lachrymatory agent, all cats fortunately survived and it was ultimately considered unsuitable for military use. Any experiment or contact with cacodyl cyanide requires extreme care and caution as it is highly dangerous.

== See also ==
- Cacodyl
- Cyanogen bromide
- Dimethyl(trifluoromethylthio)arsine
- Diphenylcyanoarsine
- Mercury(II) cyanide
- Mercury oxycyanide
- Methyldichloroarsine
- Trimethylarsine
- Trimethylsilyl cyanide
