= Dimethyl(trifluoromethylthio)arsine =

Arsenical compound for chemical weapons

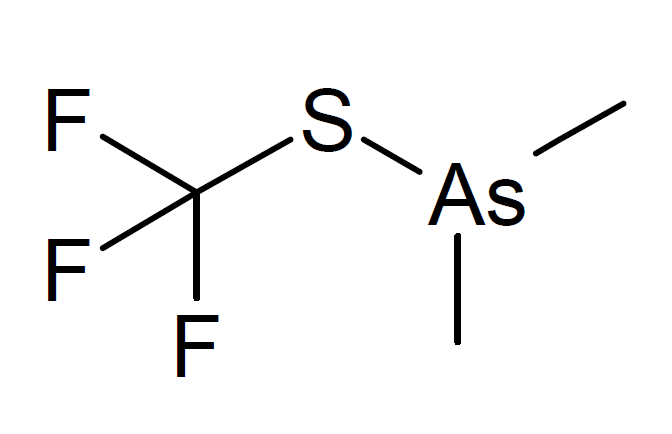

Names
- Preferred IUPAC name Trifluoromethyl dimethylarsinothioite

Identifiers
CAS Number	1959-80-4
3D model (JSmol)	Interactive image
ChemSpider	530070
PubChem CID	609788
CompTox Dashboard (EPA)	DTXSID201336537
- InChI: InChI=1S/C3H6AsF3S/c1-4(2)8-3(5,6)7/h1-2H3 Key: IBHJCFWBFOMCEV-UHFFFAOYSA-N
- SMILES: C[As](C)SC(F)(F)F

Properties
Chemical formula	C_{3}H_{6}AsF_{3}S
Molar mass	206.06 g·mol^{−1}
- Except where otherwise noted, data are given for materials in their standard state (at 25 °C [77 °F], 100 kPa). Infobox references

Dimethyl(trifluoromethylthio)arsine is an arsenical compound developed by the United States military chemical weapon research program, which is described as "one of the most potent lung irritants known."

== See also ==
- Cacodyl
- Cacodyl cyanide
- Diphenylchlorarsine
- Lewisite
- Methyldichloroarsine
- Bis(trifluoromethyl) disulfide
