= Cacodyl =

- Structural formula of cacodyl

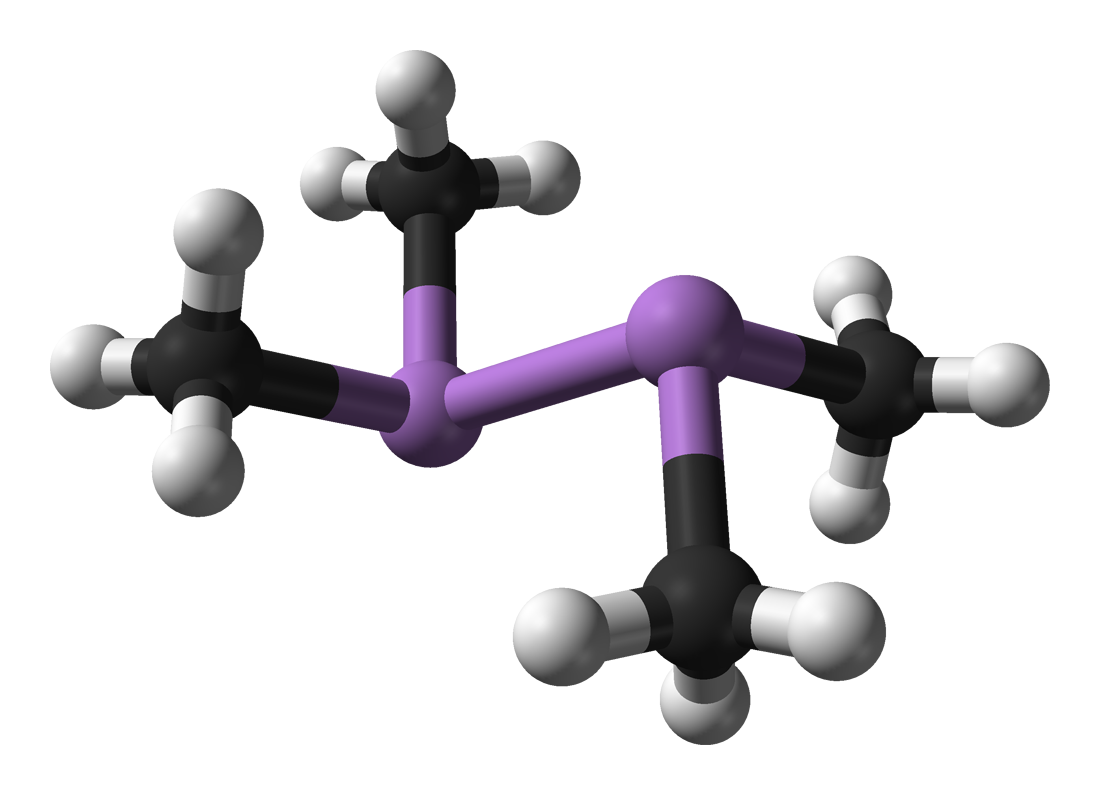
Ball and stick model of cacodyl
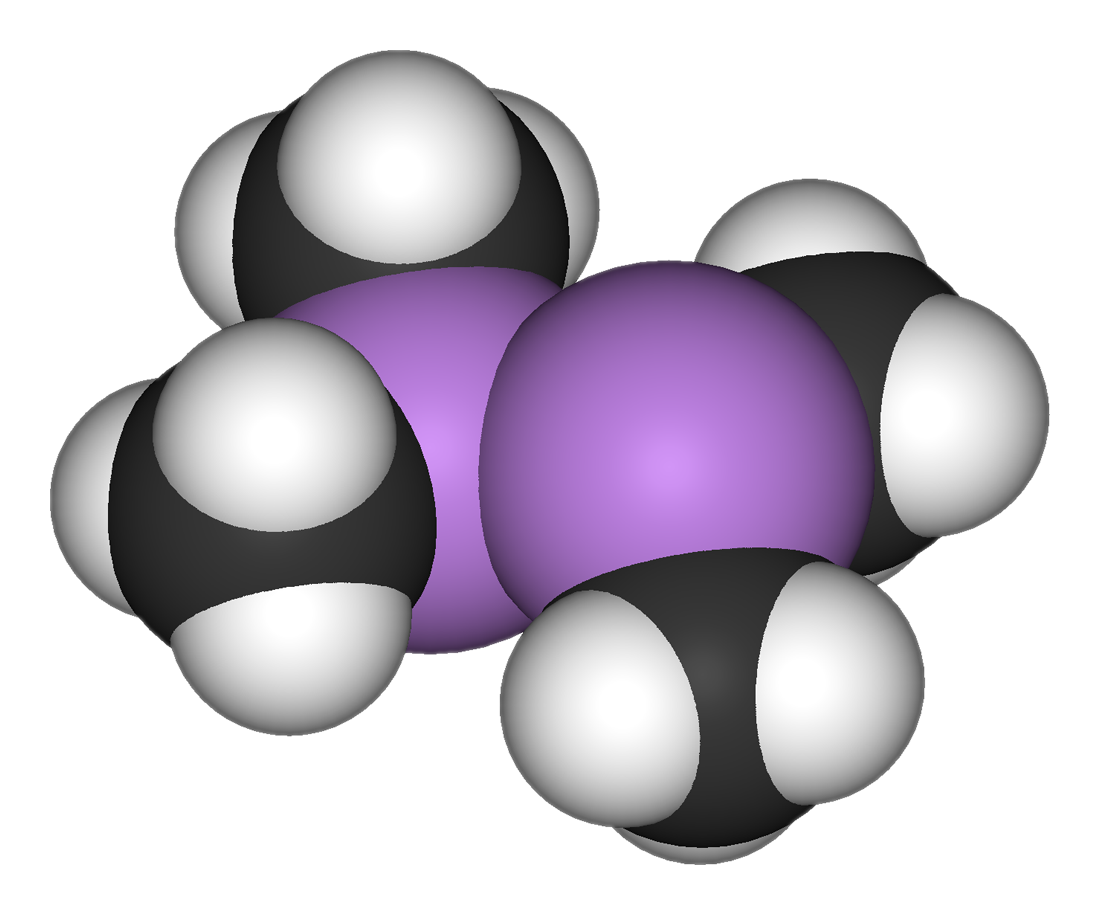
Space-filling model of cacodyl

Names
- Preferred IUPAC name Tetramethyldiarsane
- Other names Tetramethyldiarsenic(As—As) Bis(dimethylarsenic)(As—As) Tetramethyldiarsine

Identifiers
CAS Number	471-35-2
3D model (JSmol)	Interactive image; Interactive image
ChemSpider	71351
ECHA InfoCard	100.006.766
EC Number	207-440-4
PubChem CID	79018
UNII	11N299093L
CompTox Dashboard (EPA)	DTXSID30197038
- InChI: InChI=1S/C4H12As2/c1-5(2)6(3)4/h1-4H3 Key: RSKPLCGMBWEANE-UHFFFAOYSA-N; InChI=1/C4H12As2/c1-5(2)6(3)4/h1-4H3 Key: RSKPLCGMBWEANE-UHFFFAOYAG
- SMILES: [As]([As](C)C)(C)C; C[As](C)[As](C)C

Properties
Chemical formula	C_{4}H_{12}As_{2}
Molar mass	209.983 g·mol^{−1}
Magnetic susceptibility (χ)	−99.9·10^{−6} cm^{3}/mol
- Except where otherwise noted, data are given for materials in their standard state (at 25 °C [77 °F], 100 kPa). verify (what is ?) Infobox references

Cacodyl, also known as dicacodyl or tetramethyldiarsine, (CH_{3})_{2}As–As(CH_{3})_{2}, is an organoarsenic compound that constitutes a major part of "Cadet's fuming liquid" (named after the French chemist Louis Claude Cadet de Gassicourt). It is a poisonous oily liquid with an extremely unpleasant garlicky odor. Cacodyl undergoes spontaneous combustion in dry air.

Cacodyl is also the name of the functional group or radical (CH_{3})_{2}As.

== Preparation ==
A mixture of dicacodyl and cacodyl oxide ((CH_{3})_{2}As–O–As(CH_{3})_{2}) was first prepared by Cadet by the reaction of potassium acetate with arsenic trioxide. A subsequent reduction yields a mixture of several methylated arsenic compounds including dicacodyl. The global reaction (mass balance) corresponding to the oxide formation is the following:

4 CH_{3}COOK + As_{2}O_{3} → ((CH_{3})_{2}As)_{2}O + 2 K_{2}CO_{3} + 2 CO_{2}

A more efficient synthesis was later developed which started from the dimethyl arsine chloride and dimethyl arsine:

As(CH_{3})_{2}Cl + As(CH_{3})_{2}H → As_{2}(CH_{3})_{4} + HCl

== History ==
Robert Wilhelm Bunsen coined the name kakodyl (later modified to cacodyl in English) for the dimethylarsinyl radical, (CH_{3})_{2}As, from the Greek κακώδης kakōdēs ("evil-smelling") and ὕλη hylē ("matter").

It was investigated by Edward Frankland and (for over six years) by Robert Bunsen and is considered the earliest organometallic compound discovered (even though arsenic is not a true metal). Bunsen began studying it in the 1830s and had determined its chemical composition by 1843; during this time, Bunsen discovered cacodyl's flammability and extreme unpleasant odor. As this was prior to the invention of the fume hood, to avoid the unpleasant odor of the chemical, Bunsen worked quickly and breathed through a long glass tube that extended to the outside of his laboratory. Despite these precautions, Bunsen nearly died of arsenic poisoning and lost sight in one of his eyes after a glass vial of cacodyl exploded in close proximity to his face.

From cacodyl, other compounds were made, such as cacodyl fluoride, cacodyl chloride, et cetera. One compound, cacodyl cyanide, was particularly dangerous. In Bunsen's words "the smell of this body produces instantaneous tingling of the hands and feet, and even giddiness and insensibility...It is remarkable that when one is exposed to the smell of these compounds the tongue becomes covered with a black coating, even when no further evil effects are noticeable".

Work on cacodyl led Bunsen to the postulation of "methyl radicals" as part of the then-current radical theory.

== Applications ==
Cacodyl was used to try to prove the radical theory of Jöns Jacob Berzelius, which resulted in a wide use of cacodyl in research laboratories. Afterwards, interest in the toxic, malodorous compound decreased. During World War I, the use of cacodyl as a chemical weapon was considered, but it was never used in the war. Inorganic chemists discovered the properties of cacodyl as a ligand for transition metals.

== In media ==
In Law and Order season 6 episode 13 entitled "Charm City," cacodyl was used in a gas attack on a subway as the main plot point.

== See also ==
- Cacodylic acid
- Dimethyl(trifluoromethylthio)arsine
- Lewisite
- Trimethylarsine
- Cacodyl cyanide
- Cacodyl oxide
