= Mercury oxycyanide =

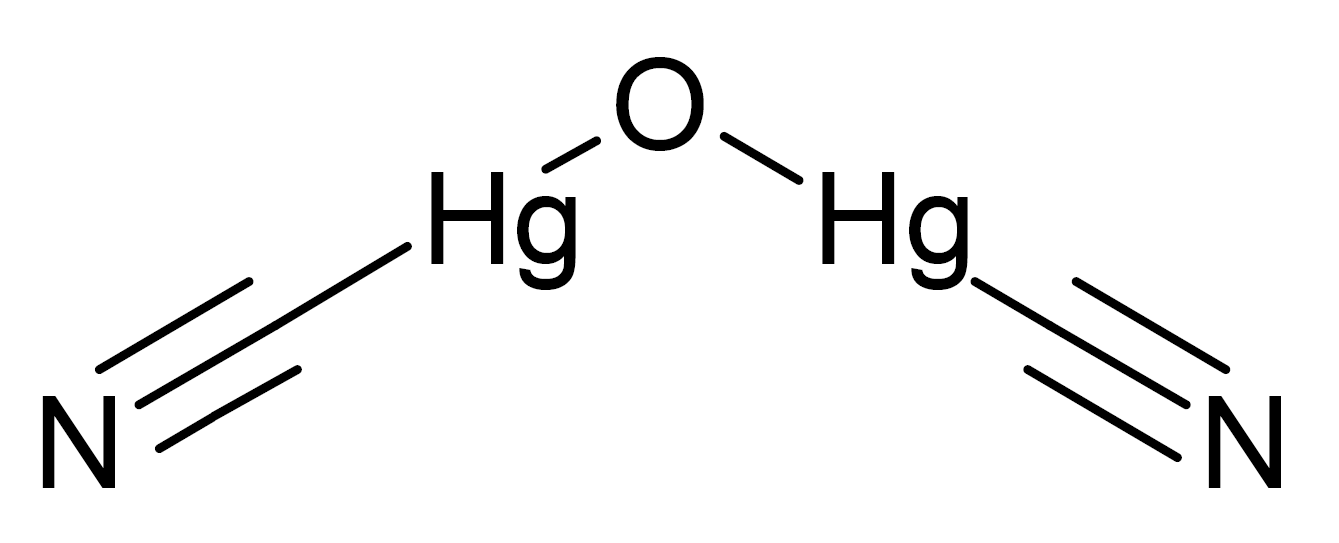

Names
- IUPAC name cyano(cyanomercuriooxy)mercury

Identifiers
CAS Number	1335-31-5
3D model (JSmol)	Interactive image
ChemSpider	62862114
ECHA InfoCard	100.014.209
PubChem CID	56843208
UNII	K68N3EK81V
CompTox Dashboard (EPA)	DTXSID801015507
- InChI: InChI=1S/2CN.2Hg.O/c2*1-2;;; Key: FWJGYFKCKCRGIV-UHFFFAOYSA-N
- SMILES: C(#N)[Hg]O[Hg]C#N

Properties
Chemical formula	C_{2}Hg_{2}N_{2}O
Molar mass	469.219 g·mol^{−1}
Density	5.94

Structure
Crystal structure	orthorhombic
Space group	Pnam
Lattice constant	a = 18.93, b = 7.09, c = 3.90
Formula units (Z)	4
Molecular shape	rough V
- Except where otherwise noted, data are given for materials in their standard state (at 25 °C [77 °F], 100 kPa). Infobox references

Mercury oxycyanide is a chemical compound, an organomercury derivative. It is both explosive and highly toxic, producing symptoms of both mercury and cyanide poisoning following exposure.

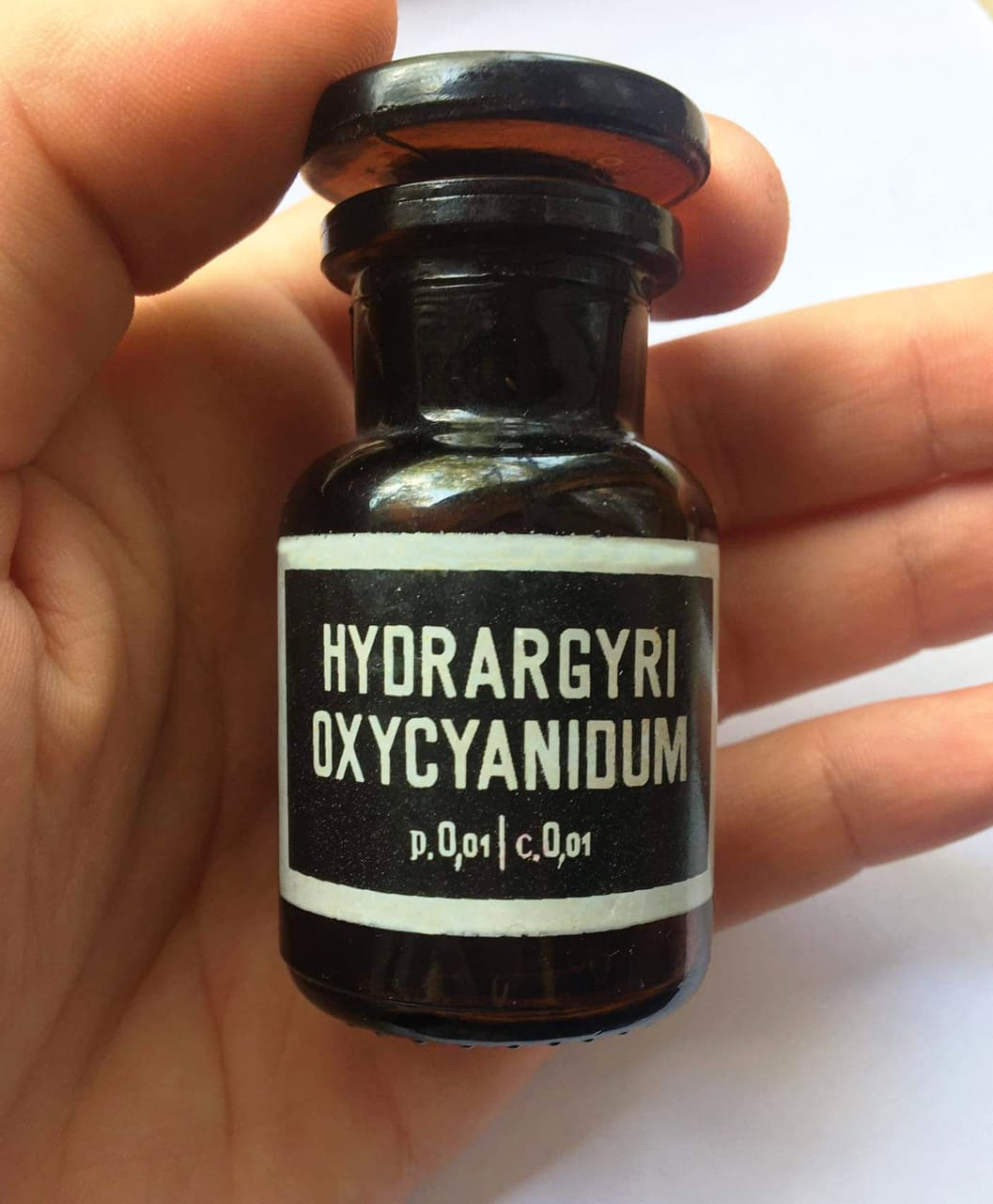
Old mercury oxycyanide jar

== See also ==
- Cacodyl cyanide
- Mercury(II) cyanide
