= Sodium hexafluoroarsenate =

Names
- Other names Sodium hexafluoroarsenate(V)

Identifiers
CAS Number	12005-86-6
3D model (JSmol)	Interactive image
ChEMBL	ChEMBL3988898
ChemSpider	11665806
EC Number	624-772-9
PubChem CID	14205726
- InChI: InChI=1S/AsF6.Na/c2-1(3,4,5,6)7;/q-1;+1 Key: NFXMAZFYHDSPPB-UHFFFAOYSA-N
- SMILES: [Na+].F[As-](F)(F)(F)(F)F

Properties
Chemical formula	NaAsF_{6}
Appearance	White powder
Solubility in water	soluble

Hazards
- GHS labelling
Pictograms	(GHS06: Toxic) (GHS09: Environmental hazard)
Signal word	Danger
- Except where otherwise noted, data are given for materials in their standard state (at 25 °C [77 °F], 100 kPa). Infobox references

Sodium hexafluoroarsenate is an inorganic chemical compound with the chemical formula NaAsF_{6}.

== Synthesis ==
Sodium hexafluoroarsenate can be obtained by the fluorination of sodium arsenate by anhydrous HF—followed by recrystallization from an aqueous solution.

== Uses ==
Sodium hexafluoroarsenate is used for pharmaceutical intermediates and chemical research.
