= Cacodylic acid =

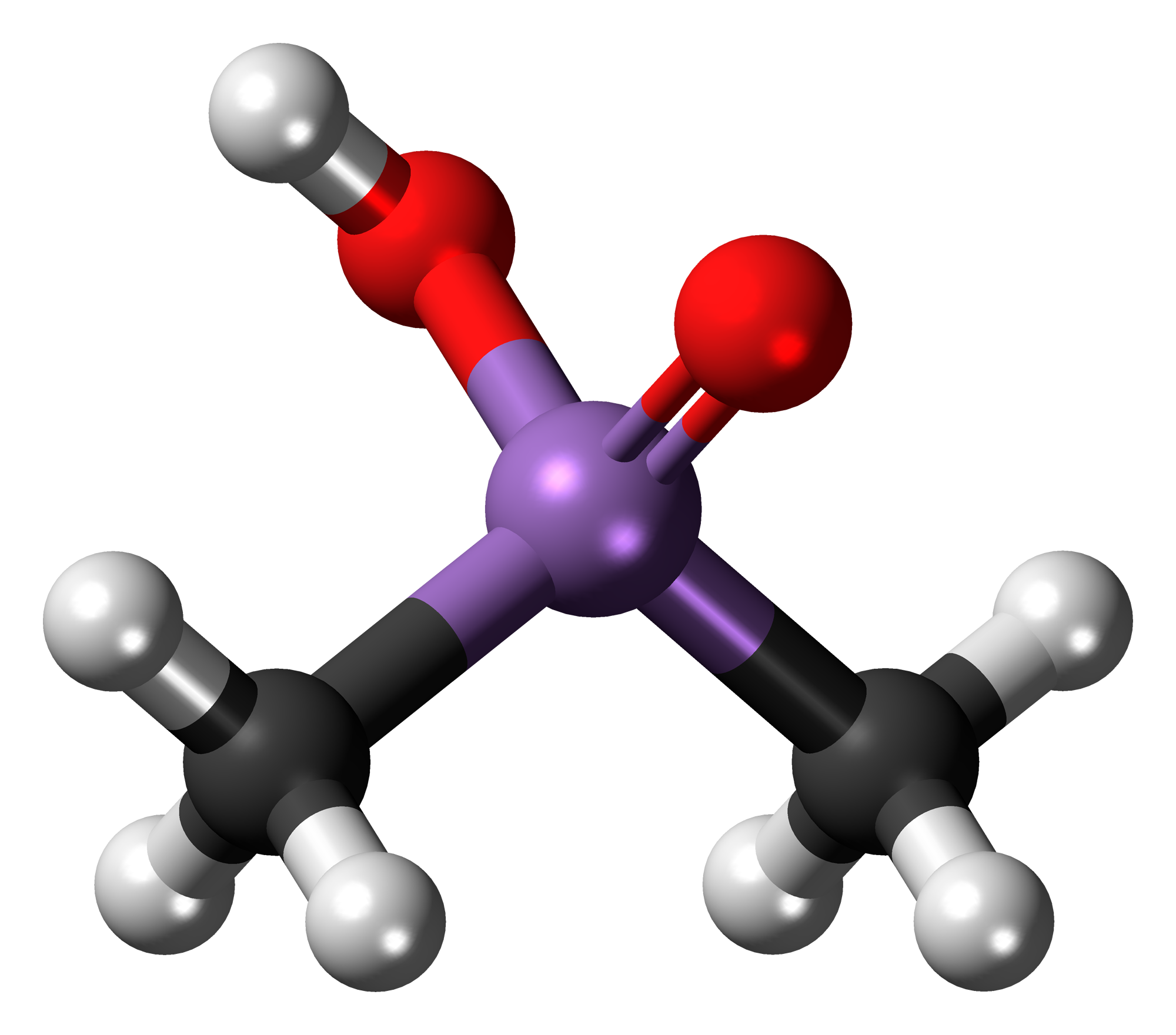
- Ball-and-stick model

Names
- Preferred IUPAC name Dimethylarsinic acid
- Other names Dimethylarsenic acid, Cacodylic acid, Hydroxydimethylarsine oxide, Arsecodile, Ansar, Silvisar, Phytar 560, DMAA, UN 1572

Identifiers
CAS Number	75-60-5
3D model (JSmol)	Interactive image
Beilstein Reference	1736965
ChEBI	CHEBI:29839
ChEMBL	ChEMBL1231644
ChemSpider	2418
DrugBank	DB02994
ECHA InfoCard	100.000.804
EC Number	200-883-4
Gmelin Reference	130562
KEGG	C07308
PubChem CID	2513
RTECS number	CH7525000
UNII	AJ2HL7EU8K
UN number	1572
CompTox Dashboard (EPA)	DTXSID7020508
- InChI: InChI=1S/C2H7AsO2/c1-3(2,4)5/h1-2H3,(H,4,5) Key: OGGXGZAMXPVRFZ-UHFFFAOYSA-N; InChI=1/C2H7AsO2/c1-3(2,4)5/h1-2H3,(H,4,5) Key: OGGXGZAMXPVRFZ-UHFFFAOYAP
- SMILES: O=[As](O)(C)C

Properties
Chemical formula	C_{2}H_{7}AsO_{2}
Molar mass	137.9977 g/mol
Appearance	White crystals or powder
Odor	odorless
Density	> 1.1 g/cm^{3}
Melting point	192 to 198 °C (378 to 388 °F; 465 to 471 K)
Boiling point	> 200 °C (392 °F; 473 K)
Solubility in water	66.7 g/100 ml
Solubility	soluble in ethanol, acetic acid insoluble in diethyl ether
Acidity (pK_{a})	6
Magnetic susceptibility (χ)	−79.9·10^{−6} cm^{3}/mol

Structure
Crystal structure	triclinic, monoclinic

Hazards
- GHS labelling
Pictograms	(GHS06: Toxic) (GHS09: Environmental hazard)
Signal word	Danger
Hazard statements	H301, H331, H410
Precautionary statements	P261, P264, P270, P271, P273, P301+P310, P304+P340, P311, P321, P330, P391, P403+P233, P405, P501
NFPA 704 (fire diamond)	4 0 0
- Lethal dose or concentration (LD, LC)
LD_{50} (median dose)	23-100 mg/kg (rat and mouse, oral)
Safety data sheet (SDS)	External MSDS
- Except where otherwise noted, data are given for materials in their standard state (at 25 °C [77 °F], 100 kPa). verify (what is ?) Infobox references

Cacodylic acid is an organoarsenic compound with the formula (CH_{3})_{2}AsO_{2}H. With the formula R_{2}As(O)OH, it is the simplest of the arsinic acids. It is a colorless solid that is soluble in water.

Neutralization of cacodylic acid with base gives cacodylate salts, e.g. sodium cacodylate. They are potent herbicides. Cacodylic acid/sodium cacodylate is a buffering agent in the preparation and fixation of biological samples for electron microscopy and in protein crystallography.

== History ==
In the 18th century it was found that combining arsenic trioxide (As_{2}O_{3}) and four equivalents of potassium acetate (CH_{3}CO_{2}K) gives a product called "Cadet's fuming liquid" which contains cacodyl oxide, ((CH_{3})_{2}As)_{2}O and cacodyl, ((CH_{3})_{2}As)_{2}.

Early research into "cacodyls" was reported by Robert Bunsen at the University of Marburg. Bunsen said of the compounds,

"The smell of this body produces instantaneous tingling of the hands and feet, and even giddiness and insensibility... It is remarkable that when one is exposed to the smell of these compounds the tongue becomes covered with a black coating, even when no further evil effects are noticeable".

His work in this field led to an increased understanding of the methyl group.

Cacodyl oxide, ((CH_{3})_{2}As)_{2}O, is often considered the first organometallic compound to be prepared synthetically.

Cacodylic acid and its salts were incorporated into herbicides by a large variety of manufacturers under numerous brand names. APC Holdings Corp. sold cacodylic acid and its salts under the Phytar brand name. The variety Phytar 560G, a mixture of cacodylic acid and sodium cacodylate, was used during the Vietnam War as a defoliant under the name "Agent Blue".

== Reactions ==
Cacodylic acid is a weak acid with a pK_{a} of around 6.25.

Cacodylic acid can be reduced to dimethylarsine, which is a versatile intermediate for the synthesis of other organoarsenic compounds:

(CH_{3})_{2}AsO_{2}H + 2 Zn + 4 HCl → (CH_{3})_{2}AsH + 2 ZnCl_{2} + 2 H_{2}O

(CH_{3})_{2}AsO_{2}H + SO_{2} + HI → (CH_{3})_{2}AsI + SO_{3} + H_{2}O

When treated with hydrogen sulfide, dithiocacodylic acid results:

(CH_{3})_{2}AsO_{2}H + 2 H_{2}S → (CH_{3})_{2}AsS_{2}H + 2 H_{2}O

== Health effects ==
Cacodylic acid is highly toxic by ingestion, inhalation, or skin contact. The U.S. EPA states that all forms of arsenic are a serious risk to human health and the United States Agency for Toxic Substances and Disease Registry ranked arsenic as number 1 in its 2001 Priority List of Hazardous Substances at Superfund sites. Arsenic is classified as a Group-A carcinogen.

== See also ==
- Arsenic
- Arsine
