= Sodium dihydrogen arsenate =

Names
- IUPAC name Sodium dihydrogen arsorate
- Other names sodium arsenate monobasic, sodium dihydroarsenate

Identifiers
CAS Number	10103-60-3
3D model (JSmol)	Interactive image
ChEBI	CHEBI:77719
ChemSpider	175215
PubChem CID	23677060
CompTox Dashboard (EPA)	DTXSID8058611
- InChI: InChI=1S/AsH3O4.Na/c2-1(3,4)5;/h(H3,2,3,4,5);/q;+1/p-1 Key: XCVRTGQHVBWRJB-UHFFFAOYSA-M
- SMILES: O[As](=O)(O)[O-].[Na+]

Properties
Chemical formula	NaH_{4}AsO_{4} (monohydrate)
Molar mass	163.9 g/mol
Appearance	colourless solid
Density	2.53 g/cm^{3}
Solubility in water	slightly soluble

Hazards
- Occupational safety and health (OHS/OSH)
Main hazards	toxic
- Except where otherwise noted, data are given for materials in their standard state (at 25 °C [77 °F], 100 kPa). Infobox references

Sodium dihydrogen arsenate is the inorganic compound with the formula NaH_{2}AsO_{4}. Related salts are also called sodium arsenate, including Na_{2}HAsO_{4} (disodium hydrogen arsenate) and NaH_{2}AsO_{4} (sodium dihydrogen arsenate). Sodium dihydrogen arsenate is a colorless solid that is highly toxic.

The salt is the conjugate base of arsenic acid:

H_{3}AsO_{4} ⇌ H_{2}AsO^{−}_{4} + H^{+} (K_{1} = 10^{−2.19})

In the laboratory, it is prepared in this way, crystallizing from a hot saturated aqueous solution, where it is highly soluble when hot (75.3 g in 100 mL at 100 °C). It is obtained as the monohydrate.

Upon heating, solid NaH_{2}AsO_{4}H_{2}O, loses water of crystallization and converts to the pyroarsenate salt Na_{2}H_{2}As_{2}O_{7}.
