= Cacodyl oxide =

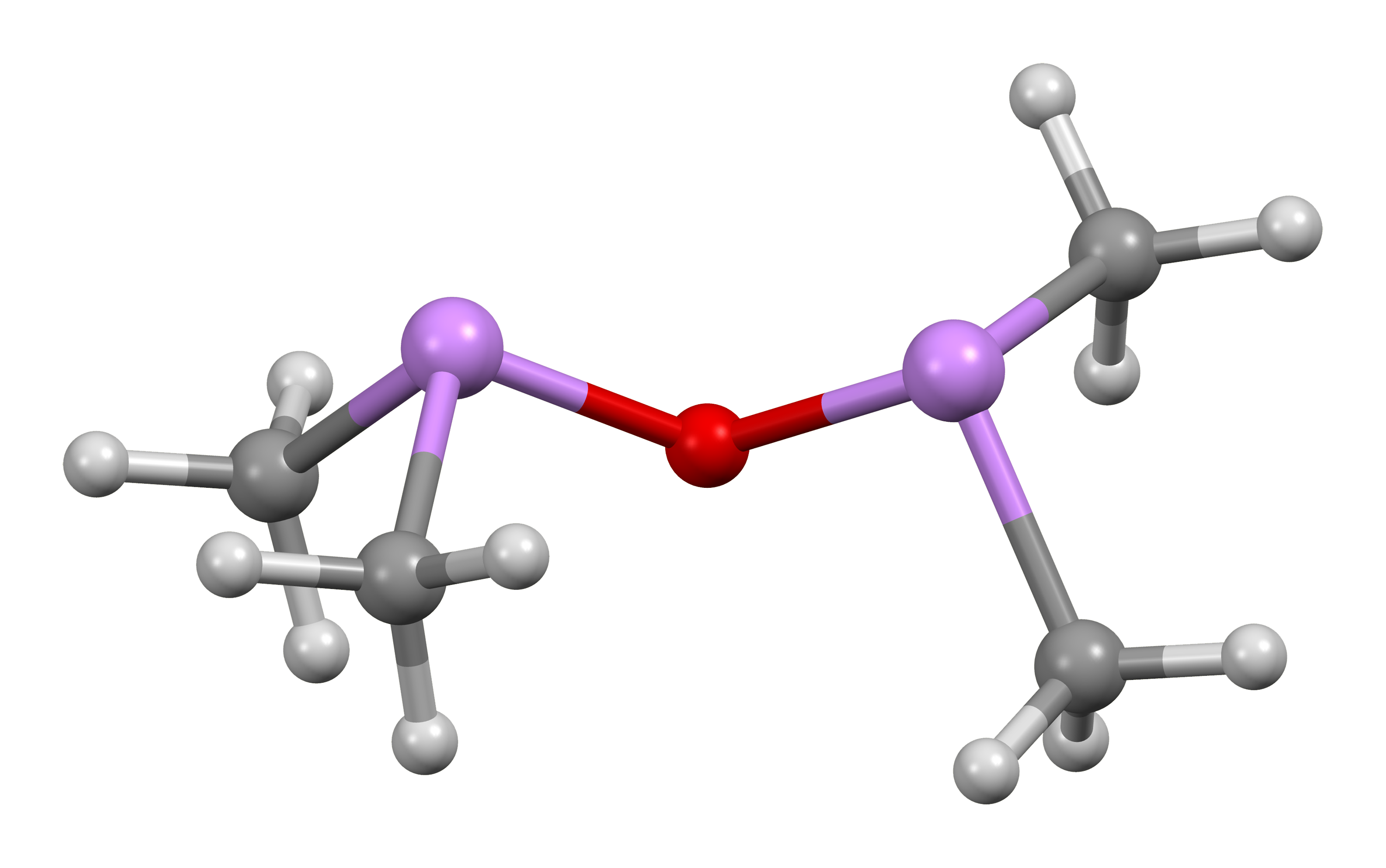
- Ball-and-stick model of cacodyl oxide

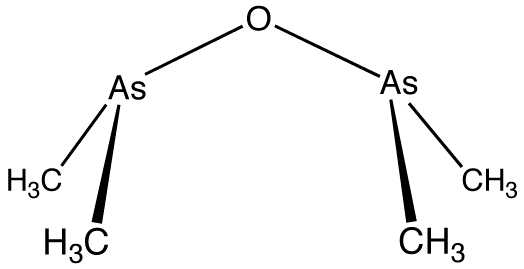
- Line structure model of cacodyl oxide

Names
- Preferred IUPAC name Dimethylarsinous anhydride
- Other names TL-297

Identifiers
CAS Number	503-80-0
3D model (JSmol)	Interactive image
ChemSpider	10002
ECHA InfoCard	100.376.169
PubChem CID	10431
CompTox Dashboard (EPA)	DTXSID70198307
- InChI: InChI=1S/C4H12As2O/c1-5(2)7-6(3)4/h1-4H3 Key: LOKPKYSOCCPWIZ-UHFFFAOYSA-N; InChI=1/C4H12As2O/c1-5(2)7-6(3)4/h1-4H3 Key: LOKPKYSOCCPWIZ-UHFFFAOYAL
- SMILES: C[As](C)O[As](C)C

Properties
Chemical formula	C_{4}H_{12}As_{2}O
Molar mass	255.98 g/mol
- Except where otherwise noted, data are given for materials in their standard state (at 25 °C [77 °F], 100 kPa). verify (what is ?) Infobox references

Cacodyl oxide is a chemical compound of the formula [(CH_{3})_{2}As]_{2}O. This organoarsenic compound is primarily of historical significance since it is sometimes considered to be the first organometallic compound synthesized in relatively pure form.

"Cadet's fuming liquid", which is composed of cacodyl and cacodyl oxide, was originally synthesized by heating potassium acetate with arsenic trioxide. It has a disagreeable odor and is toxic.

The molecular structure of [Ph_{2}As]_{2}O (Ph = phenyl), the tetraphenyl analogue of cacodyl oxide, has been established by X-ray crystallography.

== See also ==
- Arsenic
- Arsine
- Cacodylic acid
- Lewisite
- Cacodyl cyanide
