= Public Law 99-145 =

Public Law 99-145 was the United States Department of Defense Authorization Act for fiscal year 1986. It was introduced on May 16, 1985, by Senator Barry Goldwater and became law on November 8, 1985.

== Related bills and resolutions ==
The following are related to this act and part of the public record: H.RES.299, H.R.1872, S.1029, S.1042, and S.1043.

== Notable inclusions ==
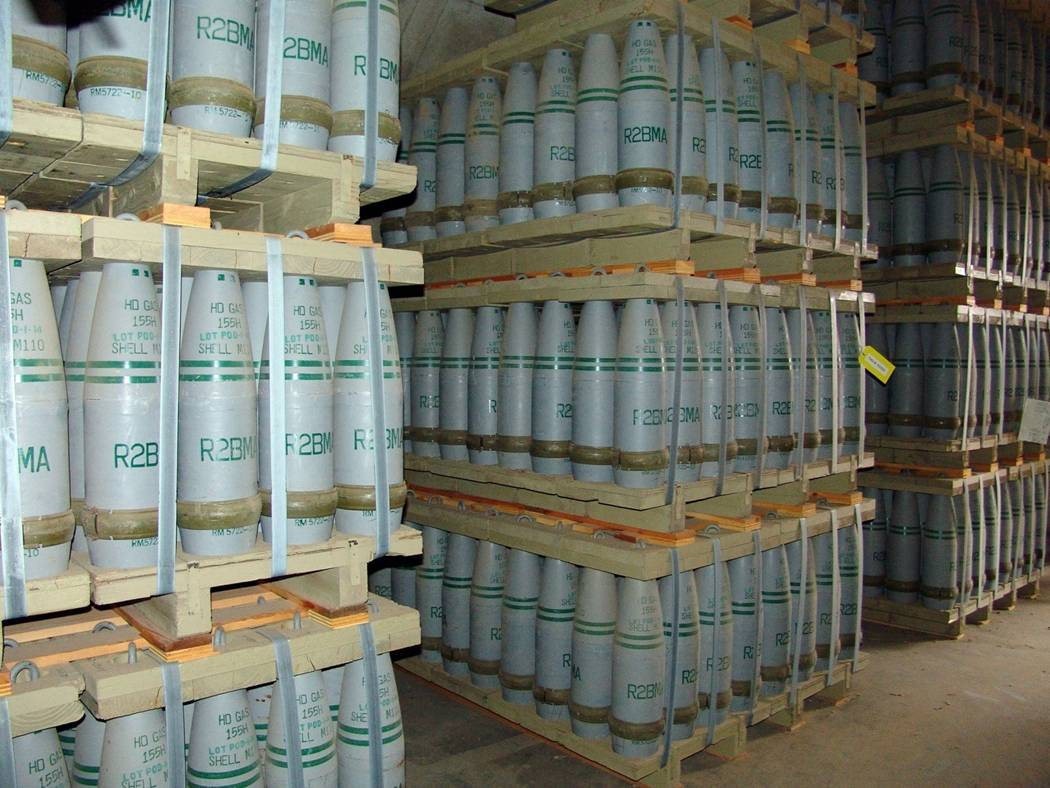
Pallets of 155 mm artillery shells containing HD (distilled sulfur mustard agent) at Pueblo Depot Activity (PUDA) chemical weapons storage facility. These are scheduled to be eliminated by 2017 at which time the Activity will be closed.

- Title IX, sections 931(b) and (c) provided for increased penalties for false claims in defense procurement:

A person who makes a false claim related to a contract with the Department of Defense shall be a civil penalty of $2,000, an amount equal to three times the amount of the damages the Government sustains because of the act of the person, and costs of the civil action.

- Section 1412 made provision for the elimination of aging stockpiles of Chemical Agents and Munitions stored within the United States. The newest of these stockpiled were already 20 years old with some being over 40 years old.

== See also ==
- Lethal Unitary Chemical Agents and Munitions
