= Arsenic trioxide =

Industrial chemical and medication

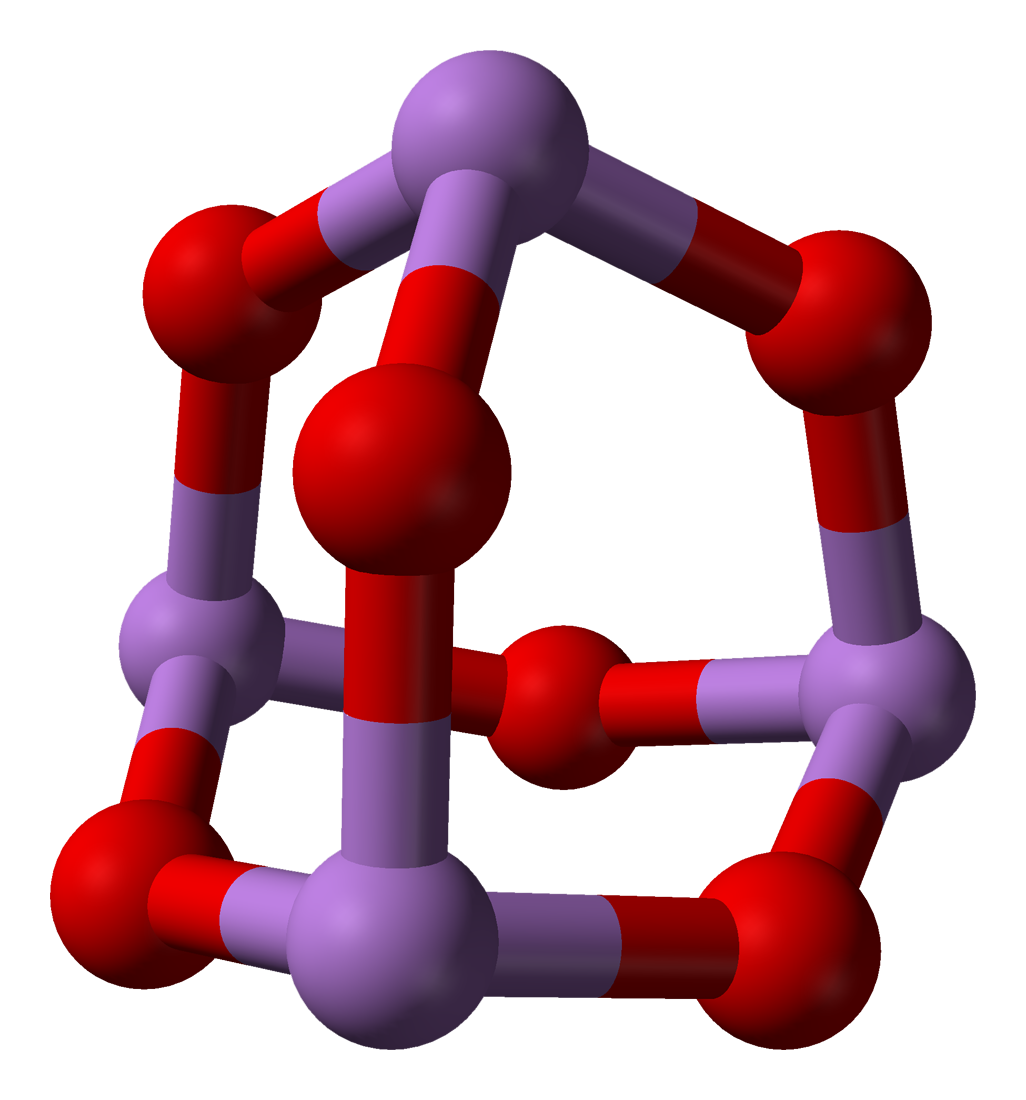

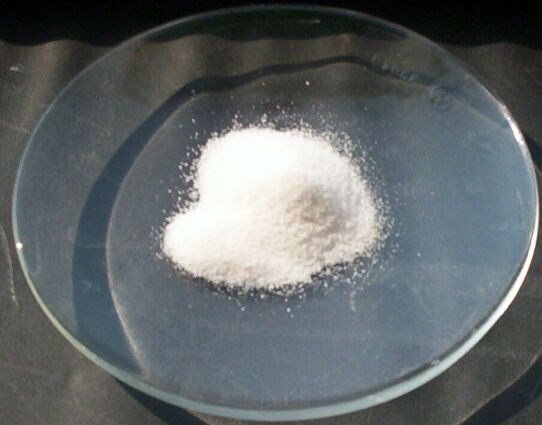

Identifiers
CAS Number	1327-53-3
3D model (JSmol)	Interactive image
ChEBI	CHEBI:30621
ChemSpider	452454
DrugBank	DB01169
ECHA InfoCard	100.014.075
Gmelin Reference	35185
KEGG	D02106
PubChem CID	518605
UNII	S7V92P67HO
CompTox Dashboard (EPA)	DTXSID0020103
- InChI: InChI=1S/As4O6/c5-1-6-3-8-2(5)9-4(7-1)10-3 Key: KTTMEOWBIWLMSE-UHFFFAOYSA-N
- SMILES: O1[As]2O[As]3O[As]1O[As](O2)O3

Properties
Chemical formula	As_{4}O_{6}
Molar mass	395.680 g·mol^{−1}
Appearance	white solid
Density	3.74 g/cm^{3}
Melting point	312.2 °C (594.0 °F; 585.3 K)
Boiling point	465 °C (869 °F; 738 K)
Solubility in water	20 g/L (25 °C (77 °F; 298 K))

Hazards
- GHS labelling
Pictograms	(GHS05: Corrosive) (GHS06: Toxic) (GHS08: Health hazard) (GHS09: Environmental hazard)
Signal word	Danger
Hazard statements	H300, H314, H350, H410
Precautionary statements	P201, P202, P260, P264, P270, P273, P280, P301+P330+P331, P303+P361+P353, P304+P340+P310, P305+P351+P338+P310, P308+P313, P363, P391, P405, P501
Threshold limit value (TLV)	0.05 mg/m^{3} (TWA)
- NIOSH (US health exposure limits)
PEL (Permissible)	0.010 mg/m^{3} (TWA, as As)
REL (Recommended)	0.002 mg/m^{3} (15 minute, as As)
IDLH (Immediate danger)	5 mg/m^{3} (as As)
Safety data sheet (SDS)	Safety Data Sheet
- Except where otherwise noted, data are given for materials in their standard state (at 25 °C [77 °F], 100 kPa). Infobox references

Arsenic trioxide is the inorganic compound with the formula As_{4}O_{6}. As an industrial chemical, its major uses include the manufacture of wood preservatives, pesticides, and glass. For medical purposes, it is sold under the brand name Trisenox among others when used as a medication to treat a type of cancer known as acute promyelocytic leukemia. For this use it is given by injection into a vein.

Arsenic trioxide was approved for medical use in the United States in 2000. It is on the World Health Organization's List of Essential Medicines. Approximately 50,000 tonnes were produced in 1991. Due to its toxicity, a number of countries have regulations around its manufacture and sale.

== Uses ==
Arsenic trioxide is the dominant form of arsenic for commercial applications. Industrial uses include usage as a precursor to forestry products, in colorless glass production, and in electronics. Being the main compound of arsenic, the trioxide is the precursor to elemental arsenic, arsenic alloys, and arsenide semiconductors. Bulk arsenic-based compounds sodium arsenite and sodium cacodylate are derived from the trioxide.

A variety of applications exploit arsenic's toxicity, including the use of the oxide as a wood preservative. Copper arsenates, such as chromated copper arsenate, are derived from arsenic trioxide. These compounds were once used on a large scale as wood preservatives in the U.S. and Malaysia, but are now banned in many parts of the world. This practice remains controversial. When combined with copper(II) acetate, arsenic trioxide gives the vibrant green pigment known as Paris green, which finds some use as an insecticide.

=== Medical ===
==== Historical ====
Despite the well known toxicity of arsenic, arsenic trioxide was used in traditional Chinese medicine, where it is known as pi-shuang (Chinese: 砒霜; pinyin: pīshuāng; lit. 'arsenic frost'). Some discredited patent medicines, e.g., Fowler's solution, contained derivatives of arsenic oxide.

==== Modern ====
Arsenic trioxide is used to treat a type of cancer known as acute promyelocytic leukemia (APL). It may be used both in cases that are unresponsive to other agents, such as all-trans retinoic acid (ATRA) or as part of the initial treatment of newly diagnosed cases. This initial treatment may include combination therapy of arsenic trioxide with all-trans retinoic acid (ATRA).

== Production and occurrence ==
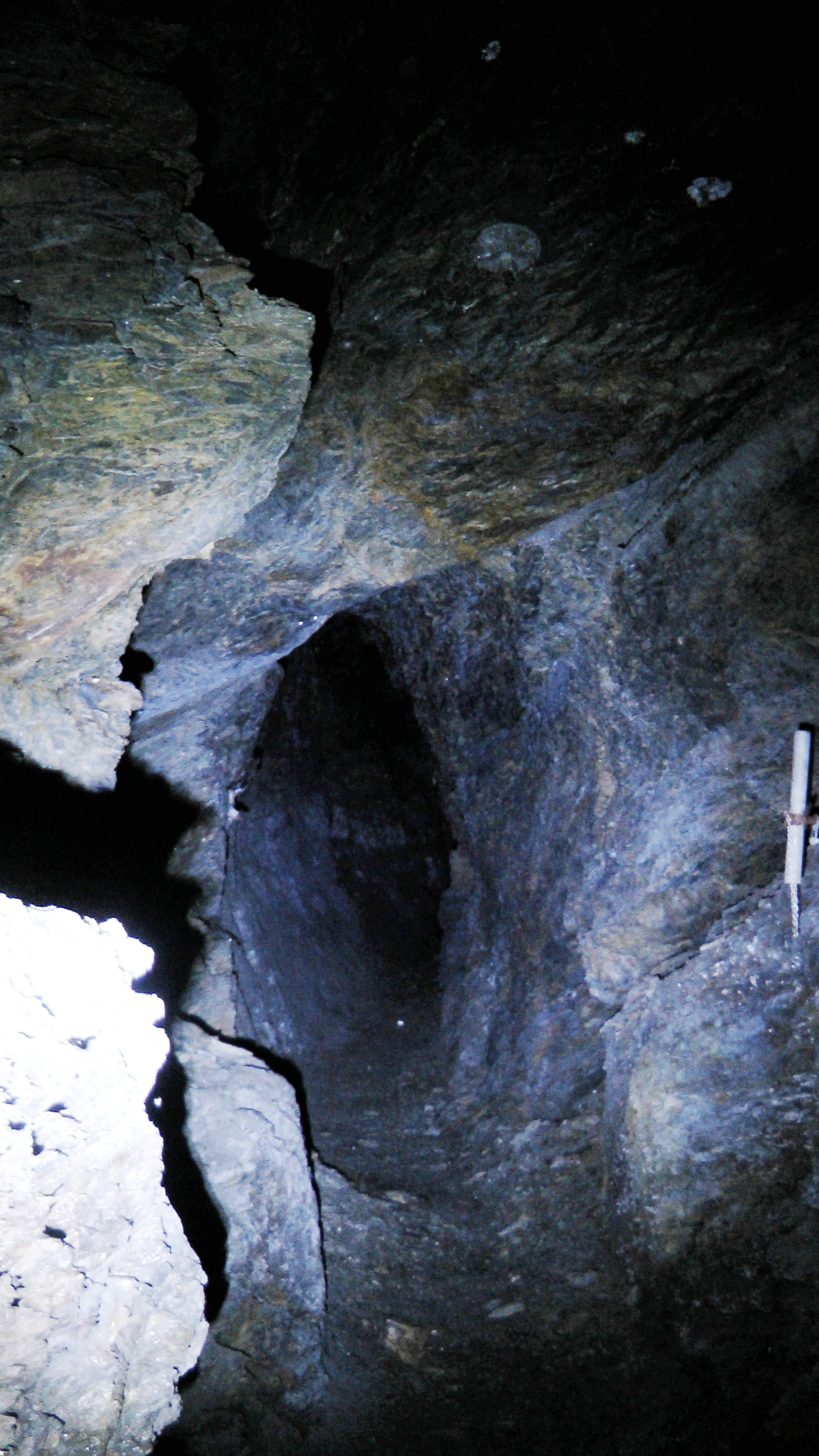
Historic arsenic mine Sankt Blasen, Austria

Arsenic trioxide can be generated via routine processing of arsenic compounds including the oxidation (combustion) of arsenic and arsenic-containing minerals in air. Illustrative is the roasting of orpiment, a typical arsenic sulfide ore.

2 As_{2}S_{3} + 9 O_{2} → 2 As_{2}O_{3} + 6 SO_{2}

Smelting and related ore processing often generate arsenic trioxide, which poses a risk to the environment. For example, the Giant Mine in Canada processed substantial amounts of arsenopyrite-contaminated gold ores.

Most arsenic oxide is, however, obtained as a volatile by-product of the processing of other ores. For example, arsenopyrite, a common impurity in gold- and copper-containing ores, liberates arsenic trioxide upon heating in air. The processing of such minerals has led to numerous cases of poisonings, and after the mine is closed, the leftover trioxide waste will present environmental hazard (as was the case with the Giant Mine, for example). Only in China are arsenic ores intentionally mined.

In the laboratory, it is prepared by hydrolysis of arsenic trichloride:

2 AsCl_{3} + 3 H_{2}O → As_{2}O_{3} + 6 HCl

As_{2}O_{3} occurs naturally as two minerals, arsenolite (cubic) and claudetite (monoclinic). Both are relatively rare secondary minerals found in oxidation zones of As-rich ore deposits.

== Reactions ==
=== Acid-base reactions ===
Arsenic trioxide is an amphoteric oxide, and its aqueous solutions are weakly acidic. Thus, it dissolves readily in alkaline solutions to give arsenites:

As_{2}O_{3} + 6 NaOH → 2 Na_{3}AsO_{3} + 3 H_{2}O

Arsenic trioxide is less soluble in acids, although it will dissolve in hydrochloric acid.

When treated with anhydrous HF and HCl, arsenic trioxide converts to the corresponding trihalide. The tribromide and triiodide are made using concentrated hydrobromic acid and hydroiodic acid, respectively:

As_{2}O_{3} + 6 HX → 2 AsX_{3} + 3 H_{2}O (X = F, Cl, Br, I)

=== Redox reactions ===
Only with strong oxidizing agents such as ozone, hydrogen peroxide, and nitric acid does it yield arsenic pentoxide, As_{2}O_{5} or its corresponding acid:

2 HNO_{3} + As_{2}O_{3} + 2 H_{2}O → 2 H_{3}AsO_{4} + N_{2}O_{3}

Unlike phosphorus trioxide, which readily combusts to phosphorus pentoxide, arsenic trioxide is not easily oxidised.

Reduction gives elemental arsenic or arsine (AsH_{3}) depending on conditions:

As_{2}O_{3} + 6 Zn + 12 HNO_{3} → 2 AsH_{3} + 6 Zn(NO_{3})_{2} + 3 H_{2}O

This reaction is used in the Marsh test.

=== Precursor to organoarsenic compounds ===
Arsenic trioxide has played a special role as entry to organoarsenic chemistry. In the 18th century it was found that combining arsenic trioxide and four equivalents of potassium acetate (CH_{3}CO_{2}K) gives a product called "Cadet's fuming liquid", which is often considered the first organometallic compound. Cadet's fuming liquid is a derivative of cacodylic acid, ((CH_{3})_{2}As)_{2}O and cacodyl, ((CH_{3})_{2}As)_{2}.

Arsenic trioxide reacts with phenyl magnesium bromide as described by the following idealized equation:

As_{2}O_{3} + 4 C_{6}H_{5}MgBr → [(C_{6}H_{5})_{2}As]_{2}O + 3 MgO + MgBr_{2}

=== Metal derivatives ===
Like many other oxides, arsenic trioxide condenses with transition metal oxyanions to give polyoxometallates. Many such clusters have been characterized by X-ray crystallography. It reacts with aqueous copper(II) acetate to give Cu(C_{2}H_{3}O_{2})_{2}·3Cu(AsO_{2})_{2}, known as Paris green.

=== Structure ===
In the gas phase below 800 °C (1,470 °F), arsenic trioxide has the formula As_{4}O_{6} and is isostructural with P_{4}O_{6}. Above 800 °C (1,470 °F) As_{4}O_{6} dissociation into molecular As_{2}O_{3}, with the same structure as N_{2}O_{3}, becomes significant. Three crystalline forms (polymorphs) are known: a high temperature (over 110 °C (230 °F)) cubic form, containing molecular As_{4}O_{6}, and two related polymeric forms. The polymers, which both crystallize as monoclinic crystals, feature sheets of pyramidal AsO_{3} units that share O atoms. One of the polymeric forms (presumably I, as II was not known at the time) is apparently the most stable form.

arsenolite (cubic)	claudetite I (monoclinic)	claudetite II (monoclinic)

The liquid state is agreed to be polymeric, and can form a glass; the liquid and glass have bonding of the same general type as the polymeric crystalline forms.

== Safety ==
As with other inorganic arsenic compounds, arsenic trioxide is toxic to living organisms. Arsenic trioxide is readily absorbed by the digestive system. Ingestion of as little as 100 mg can be fatal.

Chronic arsenic poisoning is known as arsenicosis. This disorder affects workers in smelters, in populations whose drinking water contains high levels of arsenic (0.3–0.4 ppm), and in patients treated for long periods with arsenic-based pharmaceuticals. Long-term ingestion of arsenic trioxide either in drinking water or as a medical treatment can lead to skin cancer. Reproductive problems (high incidences of miscarriage, low birth weight, congenital deformations) have also been indicated in one study of women exposed to arsenic trioxide dust as employees or neighbours of a copper foundry.

In Austria, there lived the so-called "arsenic eaters of Styria", who ingested doses far beyond the lethal dose of arsenic trioxide without any apparent harm. Arsenic is thought to enable strenuous work at high altitudes, e.g. in the Alps.
