= Potassium dihydrogenarsenate =

Names
- IUPAC name Potassium dihydrogen arsenate
- Other names Macquer's salt, KDA

Identifiers
CAS Number	7784-41-0
3D model (JSmol)	Interactive image
ChemSpider	22977
ECHA InfoCard	100.029.150
EC Number	232-065-8
PubChem CID	516881
UNII	55K74GS94Q
UN number	1677
CompTox Dashboard (EPA)	DTXSID9041100
- InChI: InChI=1S/AsH3O4.K/c2-1(3,4)5;/h(H3,2,3,4,5);/q;+1/p-1 Key: GVPLVOGUVQAPNJ-UHFFFAOYSA-M
- SMILES: O[As](=O)(O)[O-].[K+]

Properties
Chemical formula	AsH_{2}KO_{4}
Molar mass	180.032 g·mol^{−1}
Appearance	white solid
Density	2.867 g/cm^{3}
Melting point	288 °C (550 °F; 561 K)

Hazards
- GHS labelling
Pictograms	(GHS06: Toxic) (GHS08: Health hazard) (GHS09: Environmental hazard)
Signal word	Danger
Hazard statements	H301, H331, H350, H410
Precautionary statements	P201, P202, P261, P264, P270, P271, P273, P281, P301+P310, P304+P340, P308+P313, P311, P321, P330, P391, P403+P233, P405, P501
- Except where otherwise noted, data are given for materials in their standard state (at 25 °C [77 °F], 100 kPa). Infobox references

Potassium dihydrogenarsenate is the inorganic compound with the formula KH_{2}AsO_{4}. A white solid, this salt is used to prepared other arsenic-containing compounds, mainly pesticides. It is prepared by calcining arsenic oxide and potassium nitrate, followed by extraction with water.

It is an analogue of the well-known ferroelectric salt potassium dihydrogenphosphate (KDP). As expected for an arsenate and as confirmed by X-ray crystallography, As is bonded in a tetrahedral environment to four oxides. The As-O distances are near 168 PMs. The O---O distance for the hydrogen bonded is sensitive to isotopic substitution (H vs D), ranging from 250 pm in KH_{2}AsO_{4} to 254 pm in KD_{2}AsO_{4}.

Relevant acid-base equilibria for aqueous solutions of this diprotic acid derived from arsenic acid are as follows:

H_{3}AsO_{4} + H_{2}O ⇌ H_{2}AsO^{−}_{4} + H_{3}O^{+} (pK_{a1} = 2.19)
H_{2}AsO^{−}_{4} + H_{2}O ⇌ HAsO^{2−}_{4} + H_{3}O^{+} (pK_{a2} = 6.94)

== Related compounds ==
- Trisodium arsenate, Na_{3}AsO_{4}
- Disodium hydrogen arsenate, Na_{2}HAsO_{4}
- Dipotassium hydrogenarsenate
