= Silver arsenate =

Names
- IUPAC name Silver arsorate
- Other names Trisilver arsorate

Identifiers
CAS Number	13510-44-6
3D model (JSmol)	Interactive image
ChemSpider	145967
ECHA InfoCard	100.033.477
EC Number	236-841-7
PubChem CID	166835
UNII	798Q5PX67I
CompTox Dashboard (EPA)	DTXSID90928885
- InChI: InChI=1S/3Ag.AsH3O4/c;;;2-1(3,4)5/h;;;(H3,2,3,4,5)/q3*+1;/p-3 Key: IMGNYAPMSDUASV-UHFFFAOYSA-K
- SMILES: [O-][As](=O)([O-])[O-].[Ag+].[Ag+].[Ag+]

Properties
Chemical formula	Ag_{3}AsO_{4}
Molar mass	462.52 g/mol
Appearance	brown powder/lumps
Density	6.657 g/cm^{3}
Melting point	830 °C (1,530 °F; 1,100 K) (decomposes)
Solubility in water	0.64 mg/L
Solubility product (K_{sp})	1.03×10^{−22}
Solubility	soluble in acid, aqueous ammonia

Structure
Crystal structure	cubic

Thermochemistry
Std enthalpy of formation (Δ_{f}H^{⦵}_{298})	-634 kJ/mol

Hazards
- GHS labelling
Pictograms	(GHS06: Toxic) (GHS08: Health hazard) (GHS09: Environmental hazard)
Signal word	Danger
Hazard statements	H301, H331, H350, H410
Precautionary statements	P201, P202, P261, P264, P270, P271, P273, P281, P301+P310, P304+P340, P308+P313, P311, P330, P391, P403+P233, P405, P501
- Except where otherwise noted, data are given for materials in their standard state (at 25 °C [77 °F], 100 kPa). Infobox references

Silver arsenate is an inorganic compound with the formula Ag_{3}AsO_{4}. It has been used in qualitative analysis to distinguish between phosphate (Ag_{3}PO_{4} is yellow) and arsenate(V) solutions.
