= Disodium hydrogen arsenate =

Names
- IUPAC name Disodium hydrogen arsorate
- Other names Sodium arsenate dibasic

Identifiers
CAS Number	7778-43-0
3D model (JSmol)	Interactive image
ChEBI	CHEBI:91256
ChemSpider	22908
ECHA InfoCard	100.029.002
EC Number	231-902-4
PubChem CID	24500
UNII	ANU034TUJ4
UN number	1685
CompTox Dashboard (EPA)	DTXSID8032047
- InChI: InChI=1S/AsH3O4.2Na/c2-1(3,4)5;;/h(H3,2,3,4,5);;/q;2*+1/p-2 Key: IHZDYHDJAVUIBH-UHFFFAOYSA-L
- SMILES: O[As](=O)([O-])[O-].[Na+].[Na+]

Properties
Chemical formula	H_{15}Na_{2}AsO_{11} (heptahydrate)
Molar mass	312.01 g/mol (heptahydrate)
Appearance	white solid
Solubility in water	good

Hazards
- Occupational safety and health (OHS/OSH)
Main hazards	poison
- GHS labelling
Pictograms	(GHS06: Toxic) (GHS08: Health hazard) (GHS09: Environmental hazard)
Signal word	Danger
Hazard statements	H301, H331, H350, H410
Precautionary statements	P201, P202, P261, P264, P270, P271, P273, P281, P301+P310, P304+P340, P308+P313, P311, P321, P330, P391, P403+P233, P405, P501
- Except where otherwise noted, data are given for materials in their standard state (at 25 °C [77 °F], 100 kPa). Infobox references

Disodium hydrogen arsenate is the inorganic compound with the formula Na_{2}HAsO_{4}^{.}7H_{2}O. The compound consists of a salt and seven molecules of water of crystallization although for simplicity the formula usually omits the water component. The other sodium arsenates are NaH_{2}AsO_{4} and Na_{3}AsO_{4}, the latter being called sodium arsenate. Disodium hydrogen arsenate is highly toxic. The salt is the conjugate base of arsenic acid. It is a white, water-soluble solid.

Being a diprotic acid, its acid-base properties is described by two equilibria:

H_{2}AsO^{−}_{4} + H_{2}O ⇌ HAsO^{2−}_{4} + H_{3}O^{+} (pK_{a2} = 6.94)
HAsO^{2−}_{4} + H_{2}O ⇌ AsO^{3−}_{4} + H_{3}O^{+} (pK_{a3} = 11.5)

== Related compounds ==
- Monopotassium arsenate, KH_{2}AsO_{4}
