= Lithium phosphate =

Chemical compound

Names
- IUPAC name Lithium phosphate
- Other names Trilithium phosphate

Identifiers
CAS Number	10377-52-3
3D model (JSmol)	Interactive image
ChemSpider	145361
ECHA InfoCard	100.030.736
EC Number	233-823-0
PubChem CID	165867
UNII	2QM4K05Q74
CompTox Dashboard (EPA)	DTXSID60889590
- InChI: InChI=1S/3Li.H3O4P/c;;;1-5(2,3)4/h;;;(H3,1,2,3,4)/q3*+1;/p-3 Key: TWQULNDIKKJZPH-UHFFFAOYSA-K
- SMILES: [Li+].[Li+].[Li+].[O-]P([O-])([O-])=O

Properties
Chemical formula	Li_{3}PO_{4}
Molar mass	115.794 g/mol
Appearance	White powder
Density	2.46 g/cm^{3}
Melting point	1,205 °C (2,201 °F; 1,478 K)
Solubility in water	0.027 g/100 mL (25 °C)

Structure
Crystal structure	Orthorhombic
Space group	Pmn2_{1}
Lattice constant	a = 6.115, b = 5.239, c = 4.855
Coordination geometry	Tetrahedral (at all atoms)

Thermochemistry
Std enthalpy of formation (Δ_{f}H^{⦵}_{298})	-2095.8 kJ/mol

Hazards
- GHS labelling
Pictograms	(GHS07: Exclamation mark)
Signal word	Warning
NFPA 704 (fire diamond)	2 0 0

Related compounds
Other cations	Trisodium phosphate Tripotassium phosphate Caesium phosphate
- Except where otherwise noted, data are given for materials in their standard state (at 25 °C [77 °F], 100 kPa). Infobox references

Lithium phosphate is a phosphate salt of lithium, with the molecular formula Li_{3}PO_{4}. It is a white solid slightly soluble in water.

It is primarily used in the production of lithium iron phosphate (LiFePO_{4}) for making lithium-ion batteries.

== Synthesis and structure ==
Trilithium phosphate can be produced by the neutralization of lithium carbonate using phosphoric acid:

3 Li_{2}CO_{3} + 2 H_{3}PO_{4} → 2 Li_{3}PO_{4} + 3 H_{2}O + 3 CO_{2}

The low-temperature polymorph (β-Li_{3}PO_{4}) crystallizes as an orthorhombic crystal with the space group Pmn2_{1}. If heated to above 500 °C, it converts to another polymorph, γ-Li_{3}PO_{4}.

== Hazards ==
=== Health ===
Large doses of lithium phosphate may cause dizziness, and sometimes, kidney damage. According to some reports, dehydration, weight loss, and thyroid disturbances can occur due to high exposure of lithium ions. Nervous system defects, including slurred speech, blurred vision, sensory loss, and convulsions may also occur.

== See also ==
- Lithium iron phosphate
- Lithium-ion battery
