= Dipotassium hydrogenarsenate =

- (K^{+})_{2}[HAsO_{4}^{2−} ]

Identifiers
CAS Number	21093-83-4
3D model (JSmol)	Interactive image
PubChem CID	13734063
CompTox Dashboard (EPA)	DTXSID701337673
- InChI: InChI=1S/AsH3O4.2K/c2-1(3,4)5;;/h(H3,2,3,4,5);;/q;2*+1/p-2 Key: VDKPKGSKAWIEIN-UHFFFAOYSA-L
- SMILES: O[As](=O)([O-])[O-].[K+].[K+]

Properties
Chemical formula	AsHK_{2}O_{4}
Molar mass	218.122 g·mol^{−1}
Appearance	white solid
- Except where otherwise noted, data are given for materials in their standard state (at 25 °C [77 °F], 100 kPa). Infobox references

Dipotassium hydrogenarsenate is the inorganic compound with the formula K_{2}HAsO_{4}. A white solid, this salt can be prepared by neutralizing arsinic acid with potassium hydroxide. Two hydrates have been characterized by X-ray crystallography: K_{2}HAsO_{4}(H_{2}O)_{2.5} and K_{2}HAsO_{4}(H_{2}O)_{6}.

== Related compounds ==
- Potassium dihydrogenarsenate, KH_{2}AsO_{4}
