= Arsinic acid =

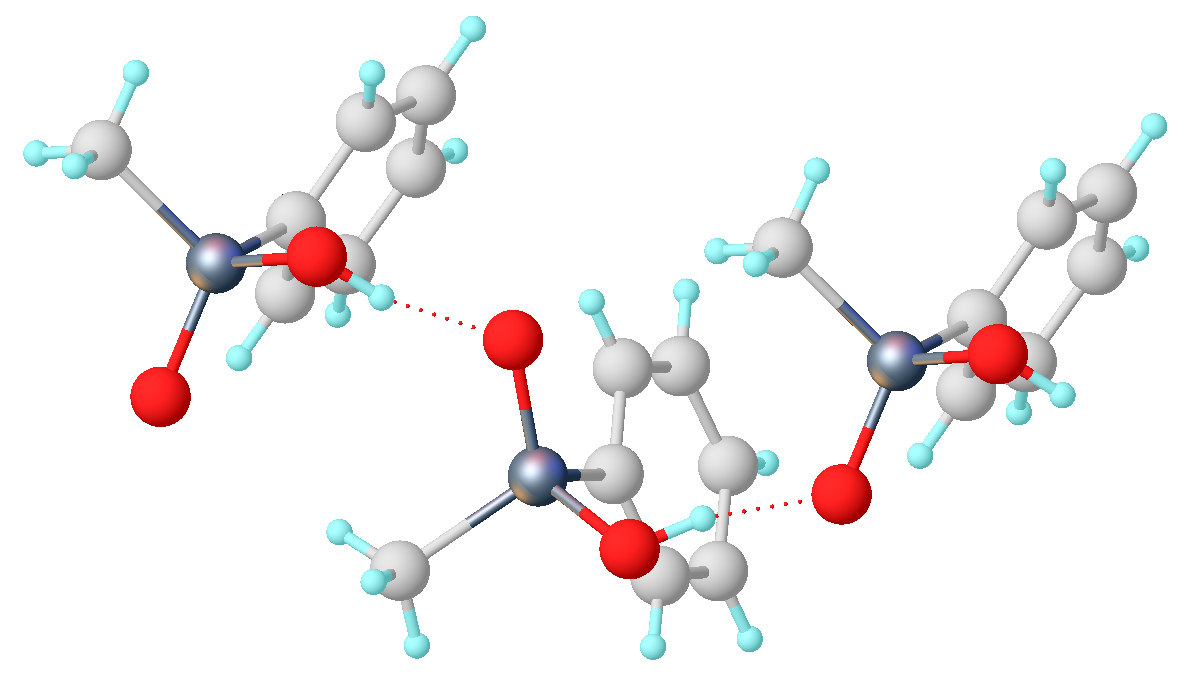
Structure of methylphenylarsinic acid showing intermolecular hydrogen-bonding.

Arsinic acids are organoarsenic compounds with the formula R_{2}AsO_{2}H. They are formally, but not actually, related to arsinic acid, a hypothetical compound of the formula H_{2}AsO_{2}H. Another related family are the phosphinic acids (R_{2}PO_{2}H).

Well known arsinic acids include diphenylarsinic acid and cacodylic acid, R_{2}AsO_{2}H (R = Ph, Me, respectively).

Arsinic acids are monoprotic, weak acids. Despite the name, they are somewhat amphoteric and form salts (as the Brønsted base) with hydrogen chloride. They react with sodium sulfide to give the dithioarsinates R_{2}AsS_{2}Na.
