= Pulmonary agent =

Chemical warfare agent

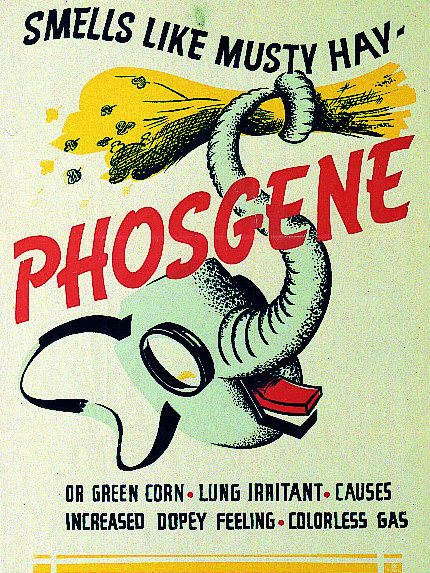
US Army phosgene identification poster from World War II

A pulmonary agent, or choking agent, is a chemical weapon agent designed to impede a victim's ability to breathe. Such compounds operate by causing a build-up of fluids in the lungs, which then leads to asphyxiation. Exposure of the eyes and skin tends to be corrosive, causing blurred vision and severe deep burns. Inhalation of these agents causes burning of the throat, coughing, vomiting, headache, pain in chest, tightness in chest, and respiratory and circulatory failure.

Examples of pulmonary agents include:

- Chlorine gas
- Chloropicrin (PS)
- Diphosgene (DP)
- Phosgene (CG)
- Disulfur decafluoride
- Perfluoroisobutene
- Acrolein
- Diphenylcyanoarsine

Phosgene is the most dangerous commonly used pulmonary agent (although disulfur decafluoride and perfluoroisobutene are both even more dangerous, with respectively 4 and 10 times the lethality of phosgene, neither is widely used). It is a colorless gas under ordinary conditions. It has a vapor density 3.4 times greater than that of air, allowing it to remain low in the air for long periods of time. Phosgene leads to massive pulmonary edema, which reaches maximum symptoms in 12 hours after exposure, followed by death within 24 to 48 hours.

Chlorine is an element used in industry. It is one of the most commonly manufactured chemicals in the United States. It is used to make pesticides, rubber, and solvents. It is also used in drinking water and swimming pools to kill bacteria. The extent of poisoning chlorine causes depends on the amount of chlorine to which a person is exposed.

== History ==
The first major use of these agents came on April 22, 1915, at the Second Battle of Ypres in Belgium. The Germans opened up 168 tons of chlorine gas on the French, Canadian and British troops which created a wind-borne cloud of chemical gas that opened up a breach in the lines. However, the Germans were not prepared to exploit the opening. In 1917 the Germans also introduced the agent phosgene. By then both sides had mastered the techniques of new choking agents such as diphosgene, chloropicrin, and perfluoroisobutene which allowed numerous attacks to be made. By the end of World War I, phosgene was responsible for roughly 80% of all deaths related to chemical attacks.
