= Mercury(II) cyanide =

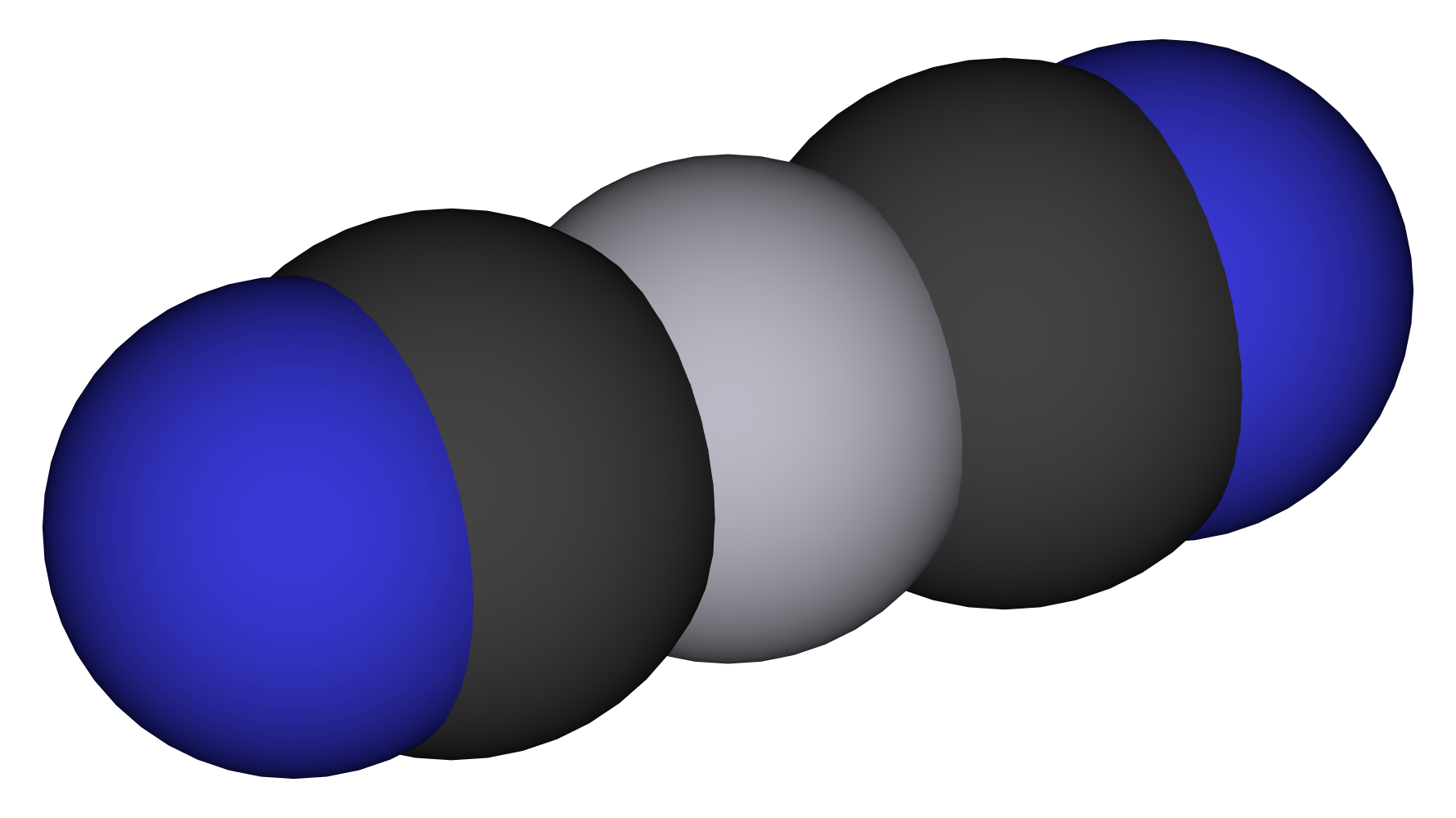

Names
- IUPAC name dicyanomercury
- Other names mercuric cyanide; cyanomercury; neutral mercury cyanide (1:2); mercury dicyanide; hydrargyri cyanidum (homeopathy)

Identifiers
CAS Number	592-04-1
3D model (JSmol)	Interactive image
Beilstein Reference	3679510
ChEBI	CHEBI:36573
ChemSpider	11103
ECHA InfoCard	100.008.857
EC Number	209-741-6
Gmelin Reference	2563
PubChem CID	11591
UNII	RWG7BD1032
UN number	1636
CompTox Dashboard (EPA)	DTXSID3060457
- InChI: InChI=1S/2CN.Hg/c2*1-2; Key: FQGYCXFLEQVDJQ-UHFFFAOYSA-N; InChI=1/2CN.Hg/c2*1-2;/rC2HgN2/c4-1-3-2-5 Key: FQGYCXFLEQVDJQ-RYFBSBGDAX
- SMILES: C(#N)[Hg]C#N

Properties
Chemical formula	Hg(CN)_{2}
Molar mass	252.63 g/mol
Appearance	colorless crystals or white powder
Odor	odorless
Density	3.996 g/cm^{3}
Melting point	320 °C (608 °F; 593 K) (decomposes)
Solubility in water	9.3 g/100 mL (14 °C); 53.9 g/100 mL (100 °C)
Solubility	25 g/100 mL (methanol, 19.5 °C) soluble in ethanol, ammonia, glycerin slightly soluble in ether insoluble in benzene
Magnetic susceptibility (χ)	−67.0·10^{−6} cm^{3}/mol
Refractive index (n_{D})	1.645

Hazards
- Occupational safety and health (OHS/OSH)
Main hazards	Highly toxic
- GHS labelling
Pictograms	(GHS06: Toxic) (GHS08: Health hazard) (GHS09: Environmental hazard)
Signal word	Danger
Hazard statements	H300, H301, H310, H330, H373, H410
Precautionary statements	P260, P262, P264, P270, P271, P273, P280, P284, P301+P310, P302+P350, P304+P340, P310, P314, P320, P330, P361, P363, P391, P403+P233, P405, P501
NFPA 704 (fire diamond)	4 0 2 POI
- Lethal dose or concentration (LD, LC)
LD_{50} (median dose)	26 mg/kg
- Except where otherwise noted, data are given for materials in their standard state (at 25 °C [77 °F], 100 kPa). verify (what is ?) Infobox references

Mercury(II) cyanide, also known as mercuric cyanide, is a poisonous compound of mercury and cyanide. It is an odorless, toxic white powder. It is highly soluble in polar solvents such as water, alcohol, and ammonia, slightly soluble in ether, and insoluble in benzene and other hydrophobic solvents.

== Molecular and crystal structure ==
At ambient temperature and ambient pressure, Hg(CN)_{2} takes the form of tetragonal crystals. These crystals are composed of nearly linear Hg(CN)_{2} molecules with a C-Hg-C bond angle of 175.0° and an Hg-C-N bond angle of 177.0° (Aylett gives slightly different values of 189° and 175°, respectively). Raman spectra show that the molecules distort at higher pressures. Between 16-20 kbar, the structure undergoes a phase transition as the Hg(II) center changes from 2- to 4-coordinate as the CN groups bind to neighboring Hg centers forming via Hg-N bonds. The coordination geometry thus changes from tetragonal to tetrahedral, forming a cubic crystal structure, analogous to the structure of Cd(CN)_{2}. Due to the ambidentate nature of the CN ligands, this tetrahedral structure is distorted, but the distortion lessens with increasing pressure until the structure becomes nearly perfectly tetrahedral at >40 kbar.

As in the solid state, in aqueous solution, Hg(CN)_{2} molecules are linear.

== Synthesis ==
Mercuric cyanide is formed from aqueous hydrogen cyanide and mercuric oxide:

HgO + 2 HCN → Hg(CN)_{2} + H_{2}O

Hg(CN)_{2} can also be prepared by mixing HgO with finely powdered Prussian blue. In addition, it can be produced by treating mercuric sulfate with potassium ferrocyanide in water:

K_{4}Fe(CN)_{6} + 3 HgSO_{4} → 3 Hg(CN)_{2} + 2 K_{2}SO_{4} + FeSO_{4}

Another method to generate mercuric cyanide is through the disproportionation of mercury(I) derivatives. In these reactions, metallic mercury precipitates, and Hg(CN)_{2} remains in solution:

Hg_{2}(NO_{3})_{2} + 2 KCN → Hg + Hg(CN)_{2} + 2 KNO_{3}

== Reactions ==
It rapidly decomposes in acid to give off hydrogen cyanide. It is photosensitive, becoming darker in color.

Mercury cyanide catalyzes the Koenigs–Knorr reaction for the synthesis of glycosides.

Cyanogen, (CN)_{2}, forms upon heating dry mercury cyanide, but the method is inferior to other routes:

Hg(CN)_{2} → (CN)_{2} + Hg

It serves as a source of Hg^{2+} in its reaction with sodium tetracarbonylcobalt:

Hg(CN)_{2} + 2 NaCo(CO)_{4} → Hg[Co(CO)_{4}]_{2} + 2 NaCN

Coordination polymers can be synthesized from Hg(CN)_{2} building blocks. Large single crystals of [(tmeda)Cu-[Hg(CN)_{2}]_{2}][HgCl_{4}] form upon treating CuCl_{2}, the soft Lewis acid Hg(CN)_{2}, and N,N,N',N'-tetramethylethylenediamine (TMEDA). The migration of two labile chloride ligands from harder Cu(II) to softer Hg(II) drives the formation of the crystal.

== Past applications ==
The use of mercuric cyanide as an antiseptic was discontinued due to its toxicity. Hg(CN)_{2} is also used in photography.

== Toxicology ==
Mercury(II) cyanide is poison with health hazard classification 4, having an oral LD50 of 33 milligrams per kilogram in mice and a subcutaneous LD50 of 2.7 milligrams per kilogram in dogs.
