= Cadet's fuming liquid =

Mixture of organoarsenic compounds

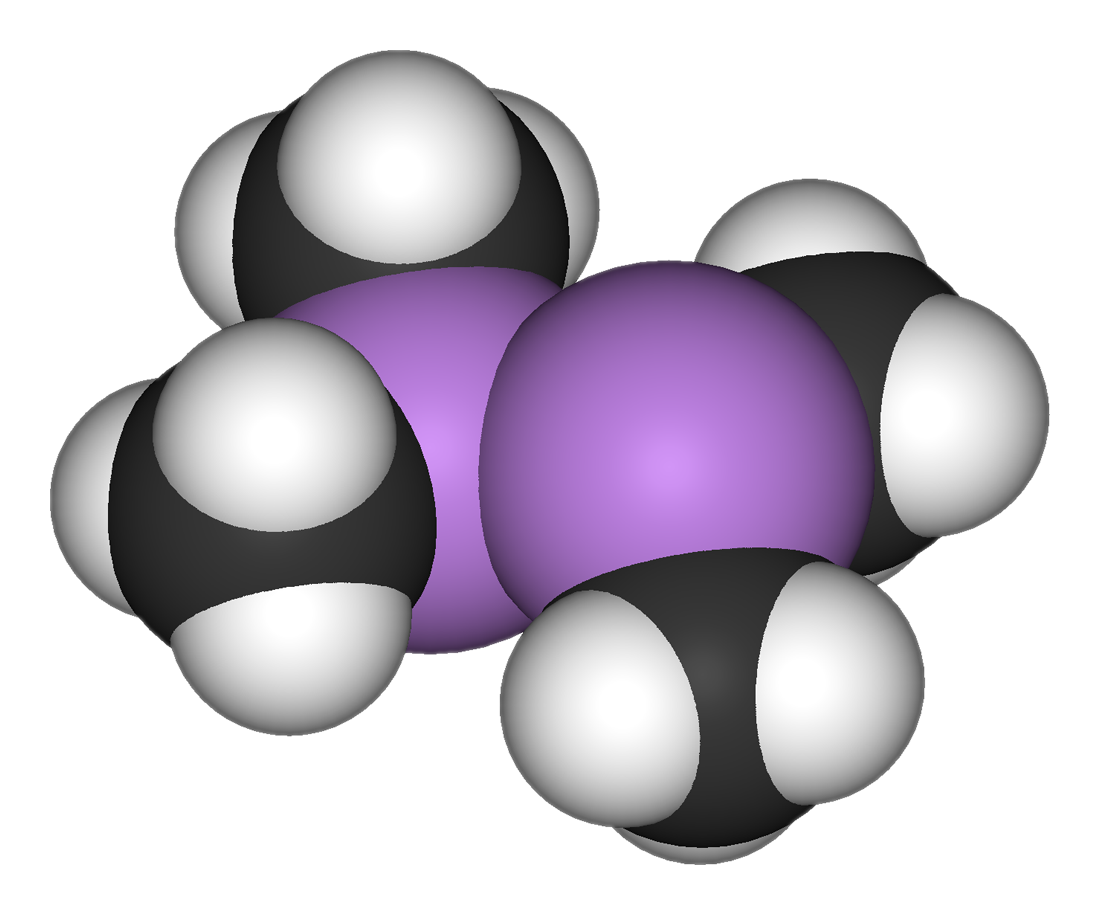
Space-filling model of dicacodyl

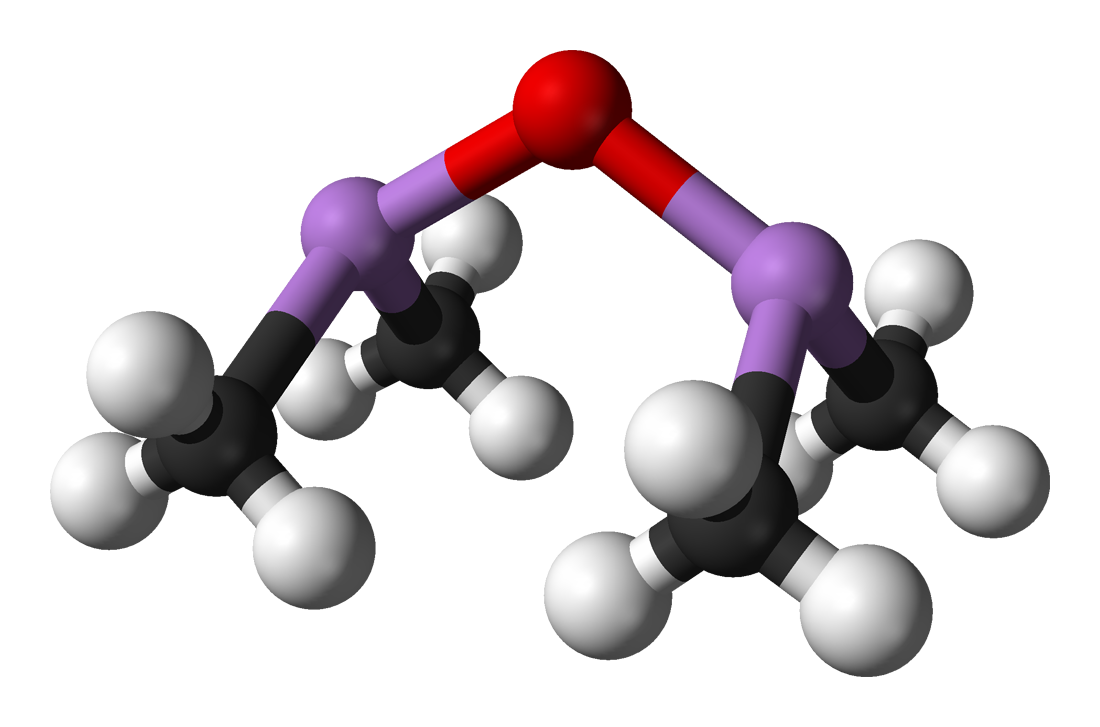
Ball-and-stick model of cacodyl oxide

Cadet's fuming liquid was a red-brown oily liquid prepared in 1760 by the French chemist Louis Claude Cadet de Gassicourt (1731-1799) by the reaction of potassium acetate with arsenic trioxide:

4 CH_{3}COOK + As_{2}O_{3} → ((CH_{3})_{2}As)_{2}O + 2 K_{2}CO_{3} + 2 CO_{2}.

It consisted mostly of dicacodyl (((CH_{3})_{2}As)_{2}) and cacodyl oxide (((CH_{3})_{2}As)_{2}O).

These were the first organometallic substances prepared; as such, Cadet has been regarded as the father of organometallic chemistry.

This liquid develops white fumes when exposed to air, resulting in a pale flame producing carbon dioxide, water, and arsenic trioxide. It has a nauseating and very disagreeable garlic-like odor.

Around 1840, Robert Bunsen did much work on characterizing the compounds in the liquid and its derivatives. His research was important in the development of radical theory.
