= Sodium arsenate =

Names
- IUPAC name Trisodium arsorate
- Other names sodium arsenate

Identifiers
CAS Number	(anhydrous): 13464-38-5; (dodecahydrate): 13510-46-8; 7631-89-2
3D model (JSmol)	(anhydrous): Interactive image; (heptahydrate): Interactive image; (dodecahydrate): Interactive image
ChEBI	(anhydrous): CHEBI:84070
ChemSpider	(anhydrous): 43027; (dodecahydrate): 29325835
ECHA InfoCard	100.033.334
EC Number	(anhydrous): 236-682-3
PubChem CID	(anhydrous): 47275; (heptahydrate): 23622126; (dodecahydrate): 57348098
UNII	(anhydrous): 7XO134LHLN
CompTox Dashboard (EPA)	(anhydrous): DTXSID9039367; (dodecahydrate): DTXSID20721563
- InChI: (anhydrous): InChI=1S/AsH3O4.3Na/c2-1(3,4)5;;;/h(H3,2,3,4,5);;;/q;3*+1/p-3 Key: CDBAKLRDFBGJOX-UHFFFAOYSA-K; (heptahydrate): InChI=1S/AsH3O4.3Na.7H2O/c2-1(3,4)5;;;;;;;;;;/h(H3,2,3,4,5);;;;7*1H2/q;3*+1;;;;;;;/p-3 Key: KOPCAWUPVBHZIP-UHFFFAOYSA-K; (dodecahydrate): InChI=1S/AsH3O4.3Na.12H2O/c2-1(3,4)5;;;;;;;;;;;;;;;/h(H3,2,3,4,5);;;;12*1H2/q;3*+1;;;;;;;;;;;;/p-3 Key: UVNGJDIGNLIVPE-UHFFFAOYSA-K
- SMILES: (anhydrous): [O-][As](=O)([O-])[O-].[Na+].[Na+].[Na+]; (heptahydrate): O.O.O.O.O.O.O.[O-][As](=O)([O-])[O-].[Na+].[Na+].[Na+]; (dodecahydrate): O.O.O.O.O.O.O.O.O.O.O.O.[O-][As](=O)([O-])[O-].[Na+].[Na+].[Na+]

Properties
Chemical formula	H_{24}Na_{3}AsO_{16} (dodecahydrate)
Molar mass	207.88851 g/mol (anhydrous)
Appearance	colourless solid
Density	1.517 g/cm^{3} (dodecahydrate)
Solubility in water	soluble

Hazards
- Occupational safety and health (OHS/OSH)
Main hazards	toxic
- GHS labelling
Pictograms	(GHS06: Toxic) (GHS08: Health hazard) (GHS09: Environmental hazard)
Signal word	Danger
Hazard statements	H301, H331, H350, H410
Precautionary statements	P201, P202, P261, P264, P270, P271, P273, P281, P301+P310, P304+P340, P308+P313, P311, P321, P330, P391, P403+P233, P405, P501
- Except where otherwise noted, data are given for materials in their standard state (at 25 °C [77 °F], 100 kPa). verify (what is ?) Infobox references

Sodium arsenate is the inorganic compound with the formula Na_{3}AsO_{4}. Related salts are also called sodium arsenate, including Na_{2}HAsO_{4} (disodium hydrogen arsenate) and NaH_{2}AsO_{4} (sodium dihydrogen arsenate). The trisodium salt is a white or colourless solid that is highly toxic. It is usually handled as the dodecahydrate Na_{3}AsO_{4}·12H_{2}O.

The compound can be obtained by neutralizing arsenic acid:

H_{3}AsO_{4} + 3 NaOH → Na_{3}AsO_{4} + 3 H_{2}O

The salt (as its dodecahydrate) is isomorphous with trisodium phosphate. The anion AsO^{3−}_{4} exists at high pH, but below pH 11.5, it converts to HAsO^{2−}_{4} (also written HOAsO^{2−}_{3}).
