= Chemical weapon =

Device that uses chemicals to kill or harm individuals

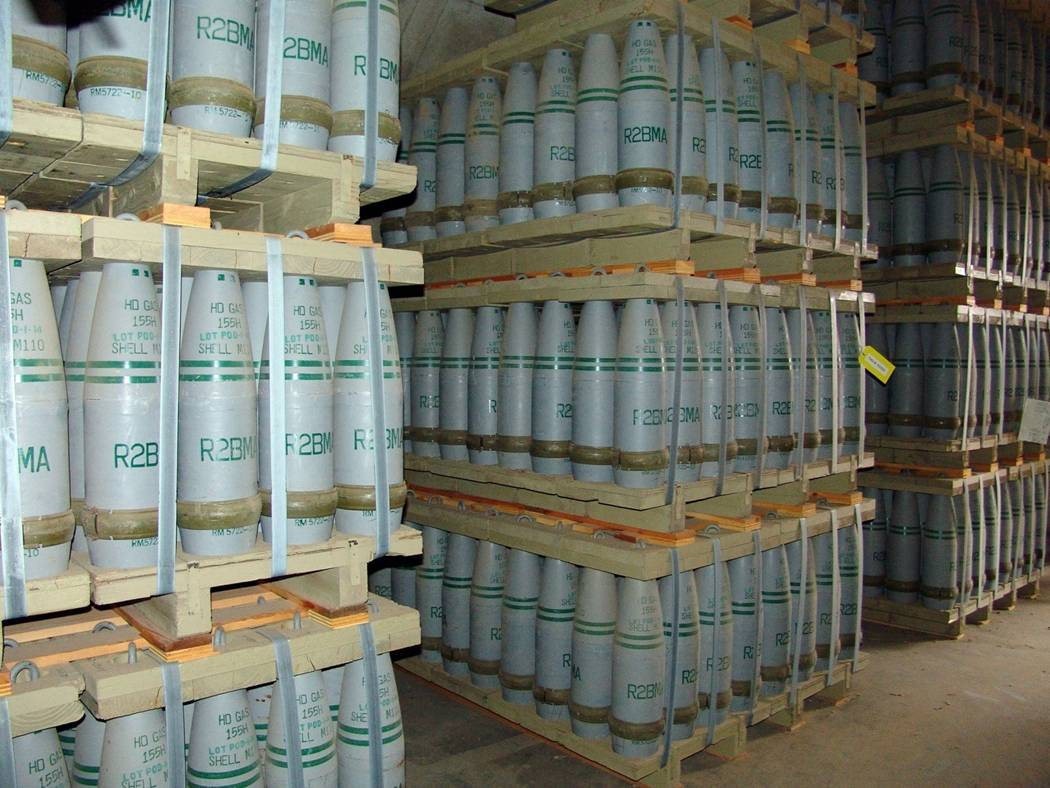
- Pallets of 155 mm artillery shells containing "HD" (mustard gas) at Pueblo Depot Activity (PUDA) chemical weapons storage facility

Blister agents
- Phosgene oxime: (CX)
- Lewisite: (L)
- Mustard gas (Yperite): (HD)
- Nitrogen mustard: (HN)

Nerve agents
- Tabun: (GA)
- Sarin: (GB)
- Soman: (GD)
- Cyclosarin: (GF)
- VX: (VX)

Blood agents
- Cyanogen chloride: (CK)
- Hydrogen cyanide: (AC)

Choking agents
- Chloropicrin: (PS)
- Phosgene: (CG)
- Diphosgene: (DP)
- Chlorine: (CI)

Vomiting agents
- Adamsite: (DM)
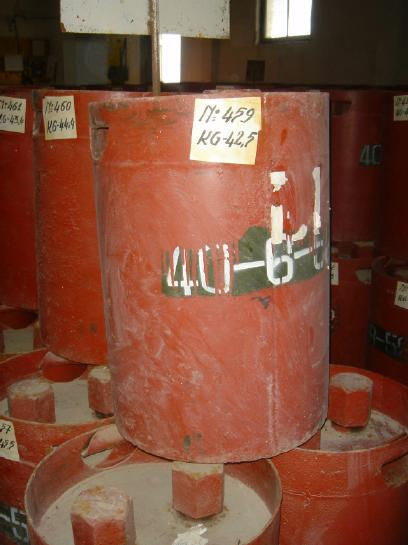
- Soviet chemical weapons canister from an Albanian stockpile

A chemical weapon (CW) is a specialized munition that uses chemicals formulated to inflict death or harm on humans. According to the Organisation for the Prohibition of Chemical Weapons (OPCW), this can be any chemical compound intended as a weapon "or its precursor that can cause death, injury, temporary incapacitation or sensory irritation through its chemical action. Munitions or other delivery devices designed to deliver chemical weapons, whether filled or unfilled, are also considered weapons themselves."

Lethal chemical weapons include nerve agents (tabun, sarin, soman, VX/VR, and Novichok) and blister agents (primarily mustard gas). Non-lethal chemical weapons include tear gases like CS gas and pepper spray and incapacitating agents like 3-Q/BZ. Chemical weapons are typically highly volatile, while some like VX are persistent. They may be unitary or binary, combining from precursors in situ. Toxin weapons, as complex biologically produced chemicals, blur the line with biological weapons.

Lethal chemical weapons are considered weapons of mass destruction, alongside biological weapons, radiological weapons, and nuclear weapons. Under the OPCW definition, toxic agents are not chemical weapons when used for another of their properties e.g. the herbicide Agent Orange or the incendiary white phosphorus.

The history of chemical warfare dates from antiquity. Chemical weapons were first used on a large scale by most major powers in World War I, employing mustard gas, the choking agents phosgene gas and chlorine, and others, causing lung scarring, blindness, and death. During World War II, Nazi Germany allegedly used a commercial hydrogen cyanide blood agent trade-named Zyklon B to commit industrialised genocide against Jews and other populations in gas chambers. The Holocaust resulted in the largest death toll to chemical weapons in history. The Empire of Japan also used chemical warfare in China during the Second Sino-Japanese War, including mustard gas and lewisite.

Nazi Germany discovered nerve agents during the war, but did not use them for fear of Allied retaliation. In the Cold War, many countries stockpiled chemical weapons. The Soviet and United States chemical weapons programs became the first and second largest in world history, focusing on sarin, VX/VR, and mustard, primarily for battlefield use in Europe. Chemical weapons were repeatedly used in the Iran–Iraq War and Syrian civil war.

At the end of the Cold War, the 1993 Chemical Weapons Convention sought a legally binding, worldwide ban on the production, stockpiling, and use of chemical weapons and their precursors. Large-scale stockpile destruction efforts followed, with the US eliminating its arsenal by 2023. As of 2025 the treaty has 193 state parties; Syria and Russia are widely believed to have violated its prohibitions on stockpiling and use while Israel and North Korea remain non-parties. Small research quantities are treaty-permitted as part of CBRN defense.

== Use ==
Chemical warfare involves using the toxic properties of chemical substances as weapons. This type of warfare is distinct from nuclear warfare and biological warfare, which together make up NBC, the military initialism for Nuclear, Biological, and Chemical (warfare or weapons). None of these fall under the term conventional weapons, which are primarily effective because of their destructive potential. Chemical warfare does not depend upon explosive force to achieve an objective. It depends upon the unique properties of the chemical agent weaponized.

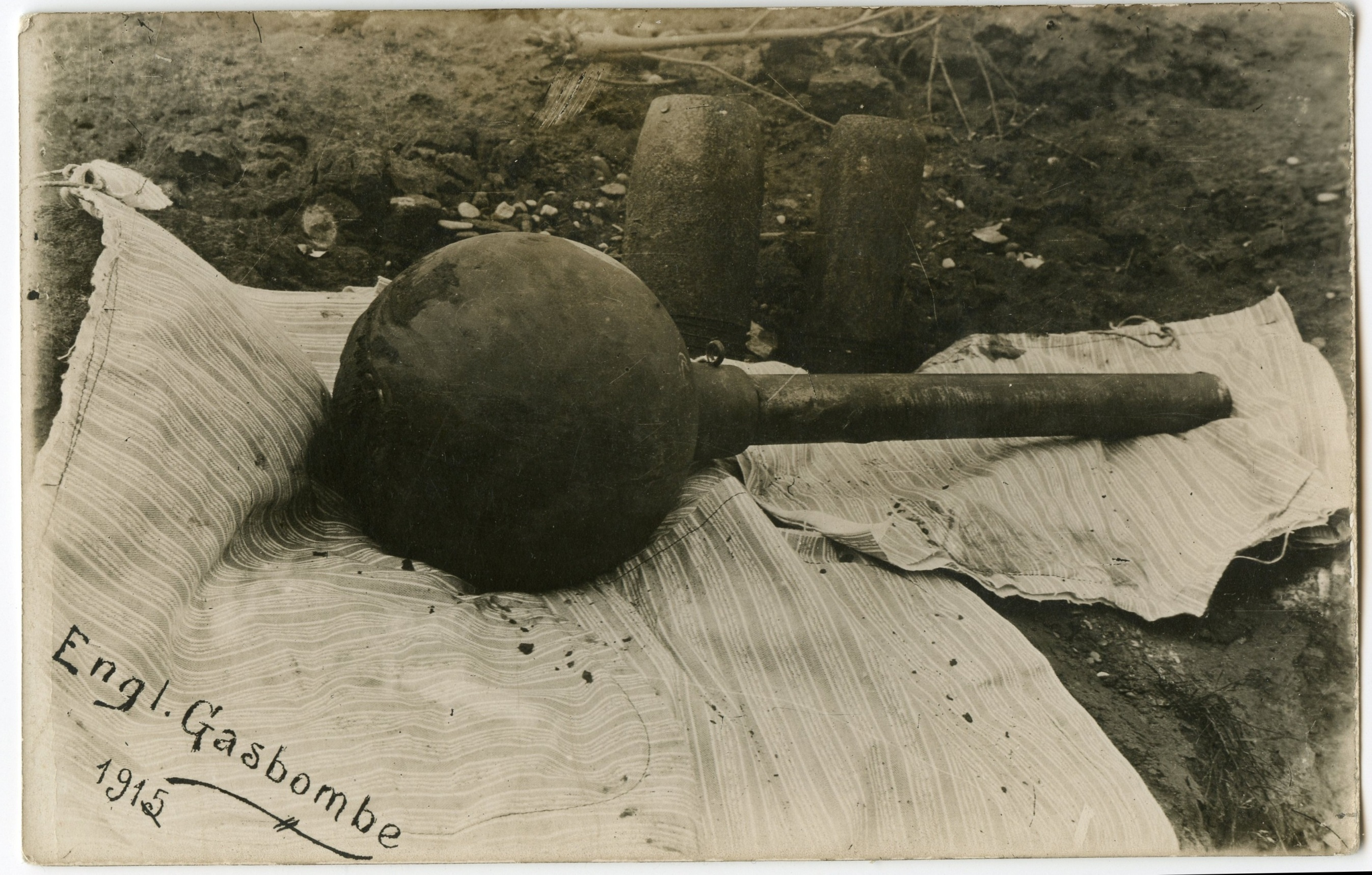
A British gas bomb that was used during World War I

A lethal agent is designed to injure, incapacitate, or kill an opposing force, or deny unhindered use of a particular area of terrain. Defoliants are used to quickly kill vegetation and deny its use for cover and concealment. Chemical warfare can also be used against agriculture and livestock to promote hunger and starvation. Chemical payloads can be delivered by remote controlled container release, aircraft, or rocket. Protection against chemical weapons includes proper equipment, training, and decontamination measures.

=== Manner and form ===
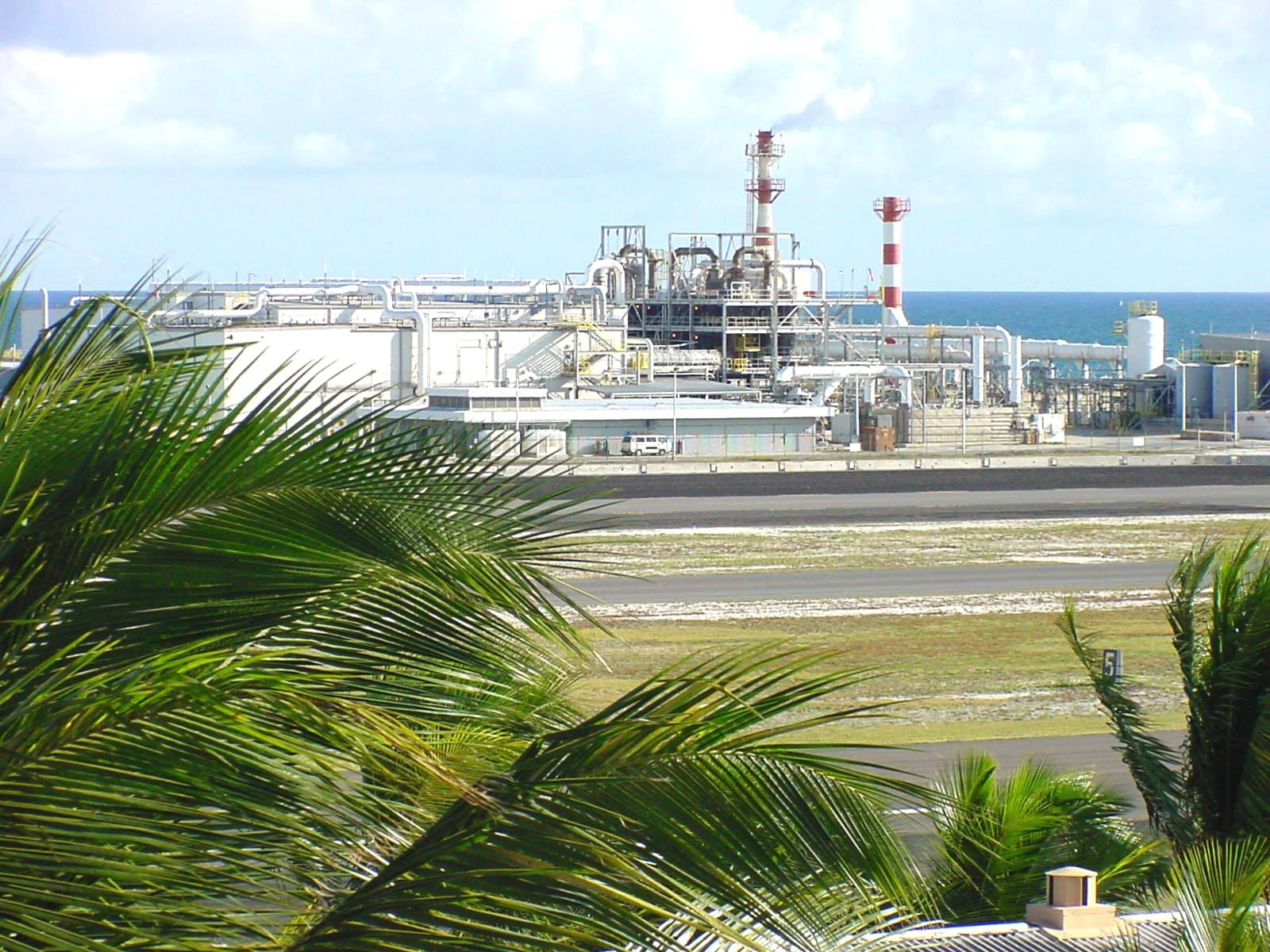
Johnston Atoll Chemical Agent Disposal System prior to demolition

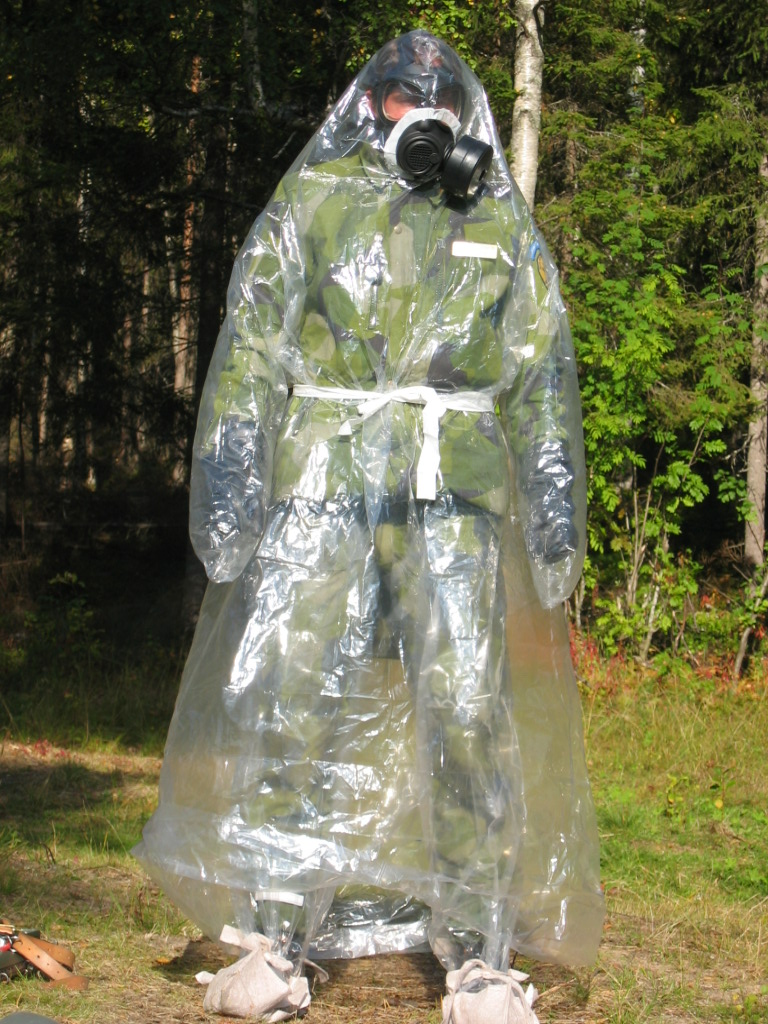
A Swedish Army soldier wearing a chemical agent protective suit (C-vätskeskydd) and protection mask (skyddsmask 90)

There are three basic configurations in which these agents are stored. The first are self-contained munitions like projectiles, cartridges, mines, and rockets; these can contain propellant or explosive components. The next form are aircraft-delivered munitions. Together they constitute the two forms that have been weaponized and are ready for their intended use. The U.S. stockpile consisted of 39% of these weapon ready munitions. The final of the three forms is raw agent housed in bulk containers. The remaining 61% of the US stockpile was stored in this manner. Whereas these chemicals exist in liquid form at normal room temperature, the sulfur mustards H and HD freeze in temperatures below 55 °F (12.8 °C). Mixing lewisite with distilled mustard lowers the freezing point to −13 °F (−25.0 °C).

Higher temperatures are a bigger concern because the possibility of an explosion increases as the temperatures rise. A fire at one of these facilities would endanger the surrounding community as well as the personnel at the installations. Perhaps more so for the community having much less access to protective equipment and specialized training. The Oak Ridge National Laboratory conducted a study to assess capabilities and costs for protecting civilian populations during related emergencies, and the effectiveness of expedient, in-place shelters.

==== Unitary versus binary weapons ====
Binary munitions contain two, unmixed and isolated chemicals that do not react to produce lethal effects until mixed. This usually happens just prior to battlefield use. In contrast, unitary weapons are lethal chemical munitions that produce a toxic result in their existing state. The majority of the chemical weapon stockpile is unitary and most of it is stored in one-ton bulk containers.

=== Lethality ===
Chemical weapons are said to "make deliberate use of the toxic properties of chemical substances to inflict death". At the start of World War II it was widely reported in newspapers that "entire regions of Europe" would be turned into "lifeless wastelands". However, chemical weapons were not used to the extent predicted by the press.

An unintended chemical weapon release occurred at the port of Bari. A German attack on the evening of December 2, 1943, damaged U.S. vessels in the harbour and the resultant release from their hulls of mustard gas inflicted a total of 628 casualties.

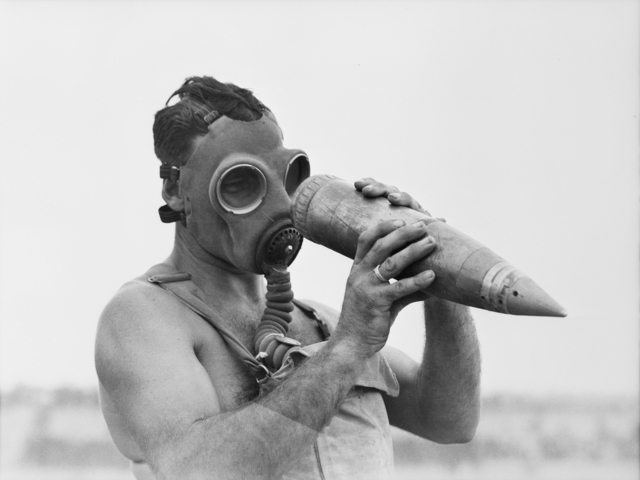
An Australian observer, who has moved into a gas-affected target area to record results, examines an un-exploded shell.

The U.S. Government was highly criticized for exposing American service members to chemical agents while testing the effects of exposure. These tests were often performed without the consent or prior knowledge of the soldiers affected. Australian service personnel were also exposed as a result of the "Brook Island trials" carried out by the British Government to determine the likely consequences of chemical warfare in tropical conditions; little was known of such possibilities at that time.

Some chemical agents are designed to produce mind-altering changes, rendering the victim unable to perform their assigned mission. These are classified as incapacitating agents, and lethality is not a factor of their effectiveness.

== History ==
John Singer Sargent's iconic World War I painting: Gassed, showing blind casualties on a battlefield after a mustard gas attack

Simple chemical weapons were used sporadically throughout antiquity and into the Industrial age. It was not until the 19th century that the modern conception of chemical warfare emerged, as various scientists and nations proposed the use of asphyxiating or poisonous gases. So alarmed were nations that multiple international treaties, discussed below, were passed – banning chemical weapons. This however did not prevent the extensive use of chemical weapons in World War I. The development of chlorine gas, among others, was used by both sides to try to break the stalemate of trench warfare. Though largely ineffective over the long run, it decidedly changed the nature of the war. In most cases the gases used did not kill, but instead horribly maimed, injured, or disfigured casualties. Estimates for military gas casualties range from 500k to 1.3 million, with a few thousand additional civilian casualties as collateral damage or production accidents.

The interwar period saw occasional use of chemical weapons, mainly by multiple European colonial forces to put down rebellions. The Italians also used poison gas during their 1936 invasion of Ethiopia. In Nazi Germany, much research went into developing new chemical weapons, such as potent nerve agents. However, chemical weapons saw little battlefield use in World War II. Both sides were prepared to use such weapons, but the Allied powers never did, and the Axis used them only very sparingly. The reason for the lack of use by the Nazis, despite the considerable efforts that had gone into developing new varieties, might have been a lack of technical ability or fears that the Allies would retaliate with their own chemical weapons. Those fears were not unfounded: the Allies made comprehensive plans for defensive and retaliatory use of chemical weapons, and stockpiled large quantities. Japanese forces used them more widely, though only against their Asian enemies, as they also feared that using it on Western powers would result in retaliation. Chemical weapons were frequently used against Kuomintang and Chinese communist troops. However, the Nazis did extensively use poison gas against civilians in the Holocaust. Vast quantities of Zyklon B gas and carbon monoxide were used in the gas chambers of Nazi extermination camps, resulting in the overwhelming majority of some three million deaths. This remains the deadliest use of poison gas in history.

The post-war era has seen limited, though devastating, use of chemical weapons. Some 100,000 Iranian troops were casualties of Iraqi chemical weapons during the Iran–Iraq War. Iraq used mustard gas and nerve agents against its own civilians in the 1988 Halabja chemical attack. The Cuban intervention in Angola saw limited use of organophosphates. The Syrian government has used sarin, chlorine, and mustard gas in the Syrian civil war – generally against civilians. Terrorist groups have also used chemical weapons, notably in the Tokyo subway sarin attack and the Matsumoto incident.

During the 2026 Iran massacres, reports from 17 January indicated the Iranian government may have used chemical weapons against protesters. Footage showed security forces atop vehicles wearing hazmat suits and masks designed for hazardous chemical materials. Some victims reportedly died several days after exposure rather than immediately. On 18 January, it was reported that the detained protesters were being injected with unknown substances while in custody. On 23 January, chemical gas was reported to have been used on the crowds of protesters and escape routes, causing severe breathing problems, burning pain of the eyes, skin and lungs, vomiting blood, and sudden weakness and loss of movement. On 4 February, a group of human rights organizations called for an investigation into the alleged use of chemical weapons.

See also chemical terrorism.

== International law ==
=== Before the Second World War ===
International law has prohibited the use of chemical weapons since 1899, under the Hague Convention: Article 23 of the Regulations Respecting the Laws and Customs of War on Land adopted by the First Hague Conference "especially" prohibited employing "poison and poisoned arms". A separate declaration stated that in any war between signatory powers, the parties would abstain from using projectiles "the object of which is the diffusion of asphyxiating or deleterious gases".

The Washington Naval Treaty, signed February 6, 1922, also known as the Five-Power Treaty, aimed at banning chemical warfare but did not succeed because France rejected it. The subsequent failure to include chemical warfare has contributed to the resultant increase in stockpiles.

The Geneva Protocol, officially known as the Protocol for the Prohibition of the Use in War of Asphyxiating, Poisonous or other Gases, and of Bacteriological Methods of Warfare, is an International treaty prohibiting the use of chemical and biological weapons in international armed conflicts. It was signed at Geneva June 17, 1925, and entered into force on February 8, 1928. 133 nations are listed as state parties to the treaty. Ukraine is the newest signatory, acceding August 7, 2003.

This treaty states that chemical and biological weapons are "justly condemned by the general opinion of the civilised world". And while the treaty prohibits the use of chemical and biological weapons, it does not address the production, storage, or transfer of these weapons. Treaties that followed the Geneva Protocol did address those omissions and have been enacted.

=== Modern agreements ===
The 1993 Chemical Weapons Convention (CWC) is the most recent arms control agreement with the force of International law. Its full name is the Convention on the Prohibition of the Development, Production, Stockpiling and Use of Chemical Weapons and on their Destruction. That agreement outlaws the production, stockpiling and use of chemical weapons. It is administered by the Organisation for the Prohibition of Chemical Weapons (OPCW), which is an independent organization based in The Hague.

The OPCW administers the terms of the CWC to 192 signatories, which represents 98% of the global population. As of June 2016, 66,368 of 72,525 metric tonnes, (92% of chemical weapon stockpiles), have been verified as destroyed. The OPCW has conducted 6,327 inspections at 235 chemical weapon-related sites and 2,255 industrial sites. These inspections have affected the sovereign territory of 86 States Parties since April 1997. Worldwide, 4,732 industrial facilities are subject to inspection under provisions of the CWC.

== Countries with stockpiles ==
In 1985, the United States Congress passed legislation requiring the disposal of the stockpiled chemical agents and munitions consisting of over 3 million chemical weapons, adding up to 31,000 tons of chemical weapons needing to be disposed of. This was ordered because a timely and safe disposal of chemical weapons is far safer than chemical weapon storage. Between the years of 1982 and 1992, the United States army reported approximately 1,500 leaking chemical weapons munitions, and in 1993 a 100-gallon chemical spill was reported at the Tooele Army Depot in Utah consisting of mustard agents. Chemical decomposition in soil is affected by many factors, such as temperature, acidity, alkalinity, meteorological conditions, and the types of organisms present in the soil, making it difficult to assess and predict safety. Spills of persistent agents, such as sulfur mustards, can remain harmful for decades.

== Disposal ==
At the end of World War II, the Allies occupied Germany and found large stockpiles of chemical weapons that they did not know how to dispose of or deal with. Ultimately, the Allies disposed large quantities of these chemical weapons into the Baltic Sea, including 32 000 tonnes of chemical munitions and chemical warfare agents dumped into the Bornholm Basin, and another 2000 tonnes of chemical weapons in the Gotland Basin.

The majority of these chemical munitions were dumped into the sea while contained in simple wooden crates, leading to a rapid proliferation of chemicals. Chemical Weapons being disposed in the ocean during the 20th century is not unique to the Baltic Sea, and other heavily contaminated areas where disposal occurred are the European, Japanese, Russian, and United States coasts. These chemical weapons dumped in the ocean pose a continual environmental and human health risk, and chemical agents and breakdown products from said agents have recently been identified in ocean sediment near historical dumping sites. When chemical weapons are dumped or otherwise improperly disposed of, the chemical agents are quickly distributed over a wide range. The long-term impacts of this wide-scale distribution are unknown, but known to be negative. In the Vietnam War of 1955–1975, a chemical weapon called agent orange was widely used by United States forces. The United States utilized agent orange as a type of 'tactical herbicide', aiming to destroy Vietnamese foliage and plant life to ease military access. This usage of agent orange has left lasting impacts that are still observable today in the Vietnamese environment, causing disease, stunted growth, and deformities.

=== United States ===
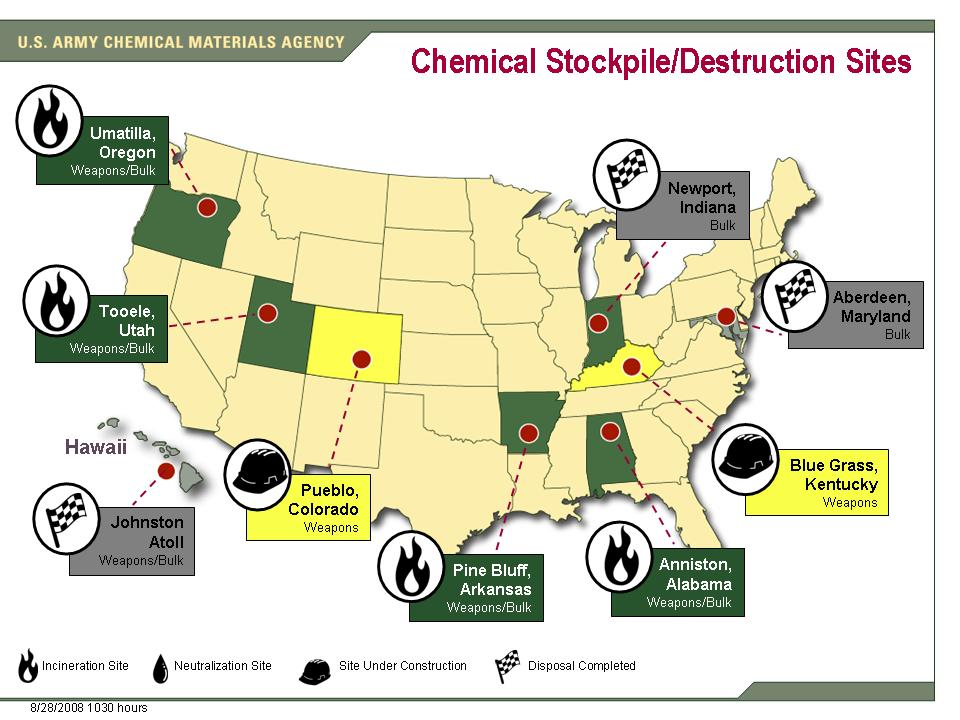
Stockpile/disposal site locations for the United States' chemical weapons and the sites' operating status on August 28, 2008

The stockpiles, which have been maintained for more than 50 years, are now considered obsolete. Public Law 99-145, contains section 1412, which directs the Department of Defense (DOD) to dispose of the stockpiles. This directive fell upon the DOD with joint cooperation from the Federal Emergency Management Agency (FEMA). The Congressional directive has resulted in the present Chemical Stockpile Disposal Program.

Historically, chemical munitions have been disposed of by land burial, open burning, and ocean dumping (referred to as Operation CHASE). However, in 1969, the National Research Council (NRC) recommended that ocean dumping be discontinued. The Army then began a study of disposal technologies, including the assessment of incineration as well as chemical neutralization methods. In 1982, that study culminated in the selection of incineration technology, which is now incorporated into what is known as the baseline system. Construction of the Johnston Atoll Chemical Agent Disposal System (JACADS) began in 1985.

This was to be a full-scale prototype facility using the baseline system. The prototype was a success but there were still many concerns about CONUS operations. To address growing public concern over incineration, Congress, in 1992, directed the Army to evaluate alternative disposal approaches that might be "significantly safer", more cost effective, and which could be completed within the established time frame. The Army was directed to report to Congress on potential alternative technologies by the end of 1993, and to include in that report: "any recommendations that the National Academy of Sciences makes ..." In June 2007, the disposal program achieved the milestone of reaching 45% destruction of the chemical weapon stockpile. The Chemical Materials Agency (CMA) releases regular updates to the public regarding the status of the disposal program. On July 7, 2023, the program completed destruction of all declared chemical weapons.

== See also ==
- 1990 Chemical Weapons Accord
- CB military symbol
- General-purpose criterion
- List of chemical warfare agents
- List of highly toxic gases
- List of psychoactive drugs used by militaries
- Psychochemical warfare
- Riot control
