= Lewisite 2 =

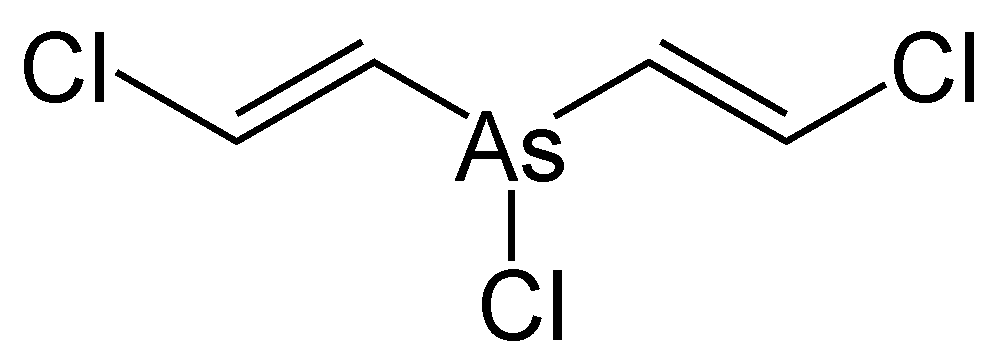
- Lewisite 2

Names
- Preferred IUPAC name Bis[(E)-2-chloroethen-1-yl]arsinous chloride
- Other names Dichlorovinylarsine chloride Chlorobis((E)-2-chlorovinyl)arsine; Bis[(E)-2-chlorovinyl]chloroarsine (E, E)-Lewisite 2

Identifiers
| CAS Number | 50361-06-3 |
| 3D model (JSmol) | Interactive image |
| ChemSpider | 4519503 |
| PubChem CID | 5368106 |
| UNII | 80474J4P87 |
| CompTox Dashboard (EPA) | DTXSID2074794 |
- InChI: InChI=1S/C4H4AsCl3/c6-3-1-5(8)2-4-7/h1-4H/b3-1+,4-2+ Key: YRFJGLQNTWLXKO-ZPUQHVIOSA-N
- SMILES: C(=C[As](C=CCl)Cl)Cl

Properties
| Chemical formula | C_{4}H_{4}AsCl_{3} |
| Molar mass | 233.35 g mol^{−1} |

Hazards
| NFPA 704 (fire diamond) | 4 1 1 |
- Except where otherwise noted, data are given for materials in their standard state (at 25 °C [77 °F], 100 kPa). Infobox references

Lewisite 2 (L-2) is an organoarsenic chemical weapon with the formula AsCl(CH=CHCl)_{2}. It is similar to lewisite 1 and lewisite 3 and was first synthesized in 1904 by Julius Arthur Nieuwland. It is usually found as a mixture of 2-chlorovinylarsonous dichloride (lewisite 1) as well as bis(2-chloroethenyl) arsinous chloride (lewisite 2) and tris(2-chlorovinyl)arsine (lewisite 3).

== Synthesis ==
Lewisite 2 is made as a byproduct along with Lewisite 3 in the reaction that makes lewisite 1. Acetylene reacts with arsenic trichloride in hydrochloric acid solution, with mercuric chloride as a catalyst, to give lewisite in 80 to 85% yield.

AsCl_{3} + C_{2}H_{2} → (ClCH=CH)AsCl_{2}

Lewisite 2 is formed when there are two additions of acetylene to the arsenic center instead of one like the reaction seen above where only lewisite one is shown.

== Exposure ==
Adverse health effects caused by lewisite can vary and depend on the amount people are exposed to and the amount of time someone is exposed to it. Lewisite immediately damages the skin, eyes, and respiratory tract and is a strong irritant and blistering agent. Due to its arsenic center, lewisite may also cause problems similar to arsenic poisonings like stomach ailments and low blood pressure.

=== Inhalation ===
Inhalation, the most common route of exposure, causes a burning pain and irritation throughout the respiratory tract, nosebleed (epistaxis), laryngitis, sneezing, coughing, vomiting, difficult breathing (dyspnea). From one acute exposure, someone who has inhaled lewisite can develop chronic respiratory disease. In severe cases of exposure, can cause fatal pulmonary edema, pneumonitis, or respiratory failure.

=== Ingestion ===
Ingestion results in severe pain, nausea, vomiting, and tissue damage. Those exposed to lewisite can develop refractory hypotension (low blood pressure) known as Lewisite shock, as well as some features of arsenic toxicity. Lewisite causes physical damage to capillaries, which then become leaky, meaning that there is not enough blood volume to maintain blood pressure, a condition called hypovolemia. When the blood pressure is low, the kidneys may not receive enough oxygen and can be damaged.

=== Eye exposure ===
The results of eye exposure can range from stinging, burning pain, and strong irritation to blistering and scarring of the cornea, along with blepharospasm, lacrimation, and edema of the eyelids and periorbital area. Eye exposure to lewisite can cause permanent visual impairment or blindness. The eyes can swell shut, which can keep the eyes safe from further exposure. The most severe consequences of eye exposure to lewisite are globe perforation and blindness. Generalised symptoms also include restlessness, weakness, hypothermia and low blood pressure.

=== Chronic exposure ===
Chronic exposure to lewisite can cause arsenic poisoning and development of a lewisite allergy. It can also cause various long-term illnesses or permanent damage to organs, depending on where the exposure has occurred, including conjunctivitis, aversion to light (photophobia), visual impairment, double vision (diplopia), tearing (lacrimation), dry mucous membranes, garlic breath, burning pain in the nose and mouth, toxic encephalopathy, peripheral neuropathy, seizures, nausea, vomiting, chronic obstructive pulmonary disease (COPD), bronchitis, dermatitis, skin ulcers, basal cell carcinoma, and squamous cell carcinoma.

== Treatment ==
Basic first aid for lewisite exposure is decontamination and irrigation of any areas that have been exposed, and when necessary airway management, assisted ventilation, and monitoring of vital signs.

Dimercaprol, also called British anti-lewisite, is the antidote for lewisite. It can be injected to prevent systemic toxicity, but will not prevent injury to the skin, eyes, or mucous membranes. Chemically, dimercaprol is a chelating agent that binds to the arsenic in lewisite. It is contraindicated in those with peanut allergies.

== See also ==
- Lewisite
- Lewisite 3
