= Lewisite =

Arsenic compound and chemical weapon

- Lewisite

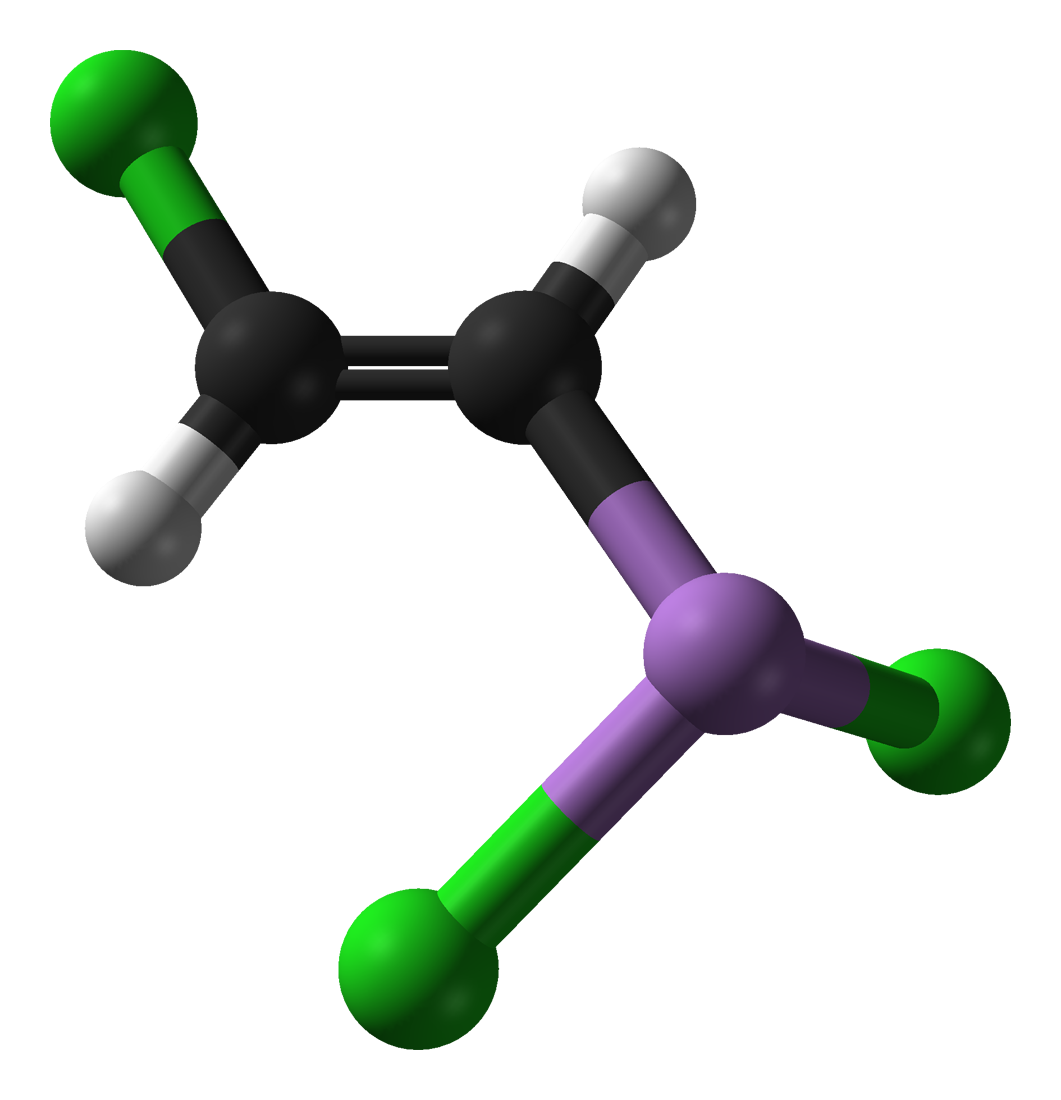

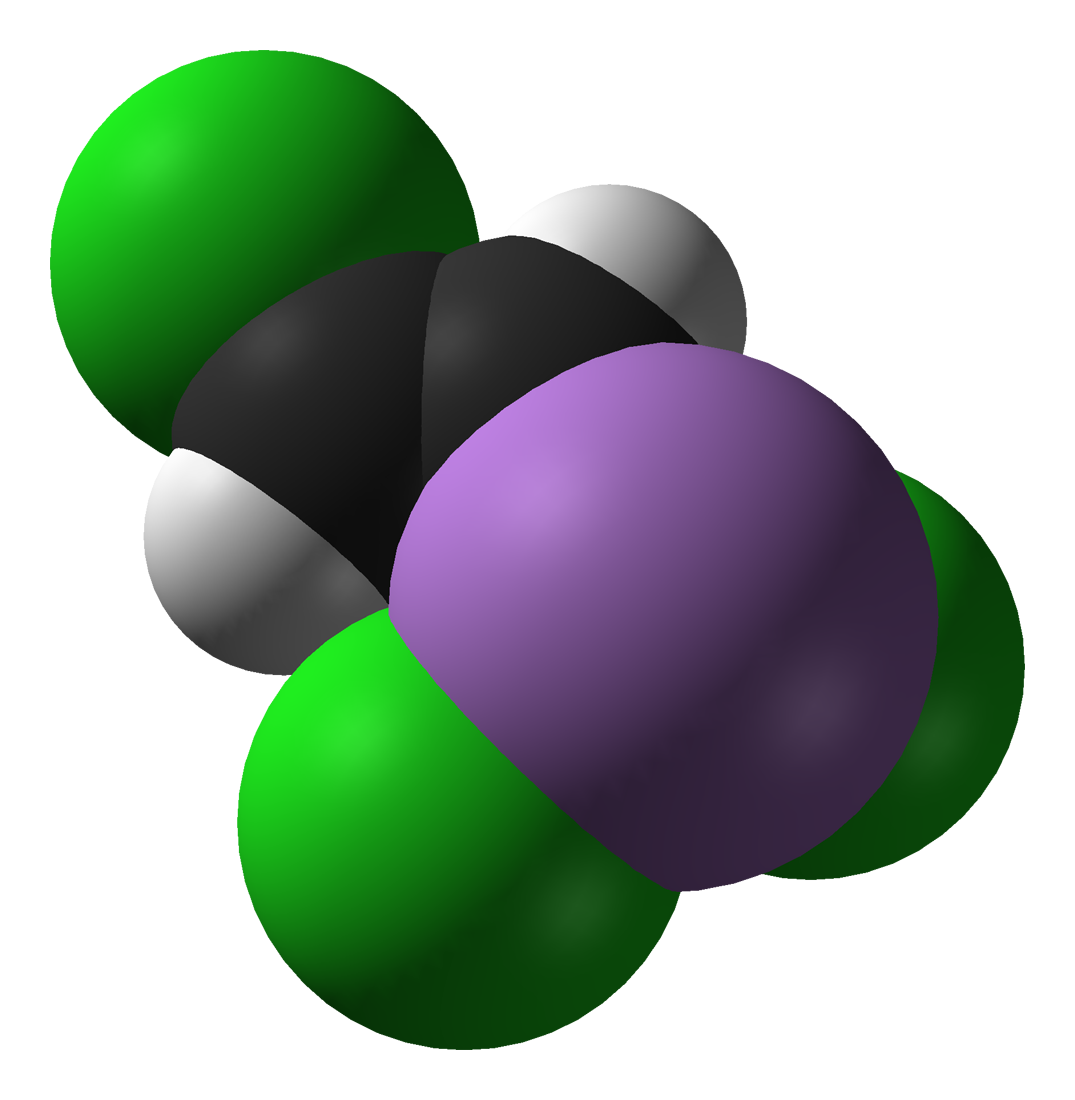

Names
- Preferred IUPAC name [(E)-2-Chloroethen-1-yl]arsonous dichloride
- Other names Chlorovinylarsine dichloride 2-Chloroethenyldichloroarsine (E)-2-Chlorovinylarsonous dichloride (E)-2-Chlorovinyldichloroarsine; Dichloro((E)-2-chlorovinyl)arsine

Identifiers
| CAS Number | 541-25-3 |
| 3D model (JSmol) | Interactive image |
| ChemSpider | 4522971 |
| MeSH | lewisite |
| PubChem CID | 5372798 |
| UNII | 82TOY8U2KD |
| UN number | 2810 |
| CompTox Dashboard (EPA) | DTXSID301259287 |
- InChI: InChI=1S/C2H2AsCl3/c4-2-1-3(5)6/h1-2H/b2-1+ Key: GIKLTQKNOXNBNY-OWOJBTEDSA-N; InChI=1/C2H2AsCl3/c4-2-1-3(5)6/h1-2H/b2-1+ Key: GIKLTQKNOXNBNY-OWOJBTEDBF
- SMILES: Cl[As](Cl)\C=C\Cl

Properties
| Chemical formula | :C_{2}H_{2}AsCl_{3} |
| Molar mass | 207.32 g/mol |
| Density | 1.89 g/cm^{3} |
| Melting point | −18 °C (0 °F; 255 K) |
| Boiling point | 190 °C (374 °F; 463 K) |
| Solubility in water | Reacts |
| Solubility | Ethers, hydrocarbons, THF |
| Vapor pressure | 0.58 mmHg (25 °C) |

Hazards
- Occupational safety and health (OHS/OSH)
| Main hazards | Flammable, highly toxic, corrosive, vesicant |
| NFPA 704 (fire diamond) | 4 1 1 |
- Except where otherwise noted, data are given for materials in their standard state (at 25 °C [77 °F], 100 kPa). verify (what is ?) Infobox references

Lewisite (L) (A-243) is an organoarsenic compound. It was once manufactured in the United States, Japan, Germany and the Soviet Union for use as a chemical weapon, acting as a vesicant (blister agent) and lung irritant. Although colorless and odorless in its pure form, impure samples of lewisite are a yellow, brown, violet-black, green, or amber oily liquid with a distinctive odor that has been described as similar to geraniums.

Lewisite is named after the US chemist and soldier Winford Lee Lewis (1878–1943). Lewisite has no applications other than use as a chemical weapon, with a chemist from the United States Army's chemical warfare laboratories stating that "no one has ever found any use for the compound".

== Chemical reactions ==
The compound is prepared by the addition of arsenic trichloride to acetylene in the presence of a suitable catalyst:

AsCl_{3} + C_{2}H_{2} → ClCH=CHAsCl_{2} (Lewisite)

This chemical process can occur a second or third time, giving lewisite 2 and lewisite 3 as byproducts.

Lewisite, like other arsenous chlorides, hydrolyses in water to form hydrochloric acid and chlorovinylarsenous oxide (a less-powerful blister agent):

ClCH=CHAsCl_{2} + 2 H_{2}O → ClCH=CHAs(OH)_{2} + 2 HCl

This reaction is accelerated in alkaline solutions, and forms acetylene and trisodium arsenate.

Lewisite reacts with metals to form hydrogen gas. It is combustible, but difficult to ignite.

== Applications ==
Apart from deliberately injuring and killing people, lewisite has no commercial, industrial, or scientific applications. In a 1959 paper regarding the development of a batch process for lewisite synthesis, Gordon Jarman of the United States Army Chemical Warfare Laboratories said:

The manufacture can be one of the easiest and most economical in the metal-organic field, and it is regretted that no one has ever found any use for the compound. It is a pity to waste such a neat process.

While the compound itself has no useful application, a 1993 report from the US Defense Nuclear Agency detailed attempts by Russian chemists to deal with existing stockpiles of lewisite (around 500 cubic meters at the time) by "exploring processes for the conversion of these agents to marketable products", including the extraction of high-purity arsenic for use in semiconductor doping (as gallium arsenide). The report, however, concluded that "the engineering and scale up of the process to a production level may be prohibitively difficult" and that "unless other metallic impurities which are likely to be found in Lewisite are removed, the high purity required for chip application may require additional steps", noting that worldwide demand for arsenic compounds (already declining at the time) was projected to shrink further, and that the proposed economics of the conversion process did not align with then-current prices for gallium arsenide.

== Mechanism of action ==
Lewisite is a suicide inhibitor of the E3 component of pyruvate dehydrogenase. As an efficient method to produce ATP, pyruvate dehydrogenase is involved in the conversion of pyruvate to acetyl-CoA. The latter subsequently enters the TCA cycle. Peripheral nervous system pathology usually arises from Lewisite exposure as the nervous system essentially relies on glucose as its only catabolic fuel.

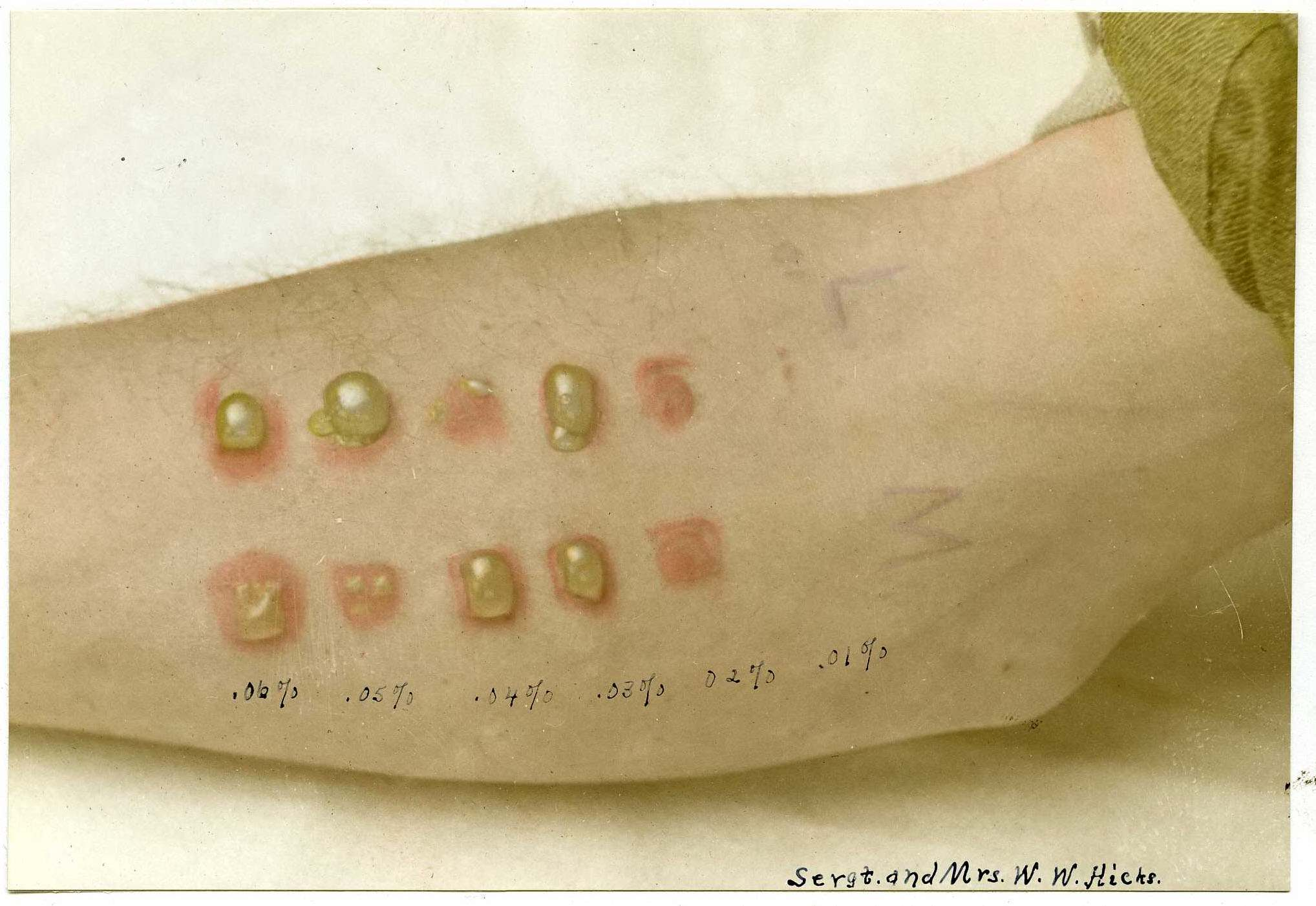
Lewisite (top row) and mustard gas test with concentrations from 0.01% to 0.06%

It can easily penetrate ordinary clothing and latex rubber gloves. Upon skin contact it causes immediate stinging, burning pain and itching that can last for 24 hours. Within minutes, a rash develops and the agent is absorbed through the skin. Large, fluid-filled blisters (similar to those caused by mustard gas exposure) develop after approximately 12 hours and cause pain for 2–3 days. These are severe chemical burns and begin with small blisters in the red areas of the skin within 2–3 hours and grow worse, encompassing the entire red area, for the ensuing 12–18 hours after initial exposure. Liquid lewisite has faster effects than lewisite vapor. Sufficient absorption can cause deadly liver necrosis.

Those exposed to lewisite can develop refractory hypotension (low blood pressure) known as Lewisite shock, with some features of arsenic toxicity. Lewisite damages capillaries, which then become leaky, reducing blood volume required to maintain blood pressure, a condition called hypovolemia. When the blood pressure is low, the kidneys may not receive enough oxygen and can be damaged.

Inhalation, the most common route of exposure, causes burning pain and irritation throughout the respiratory tract, nosebleed (epistaxis), laryngitis, sneezing, coughing, vomiting, difficult breathing (dyspnea), and in severe cases of exposure, can cause fatal pulmonary edema, pneumonitis, or respiratory failure. Ingestion results in severe pain, nausea, vomiting, and tissue damage. The results of eye exposure can range from stinging, burning pain, and strong irritation to blistering and scarring of the cornea, along with blepharospasm, lacrimation, and edema of the eyelids and periorbital area. The eyes can swell shut, which can keep the eyes safe from further exposure. The most severe consequences of eye exposure to lewisite are globe perforation and blindness. Generalised symptoms also include restlessness, weakness, hypothermia, and low blood pressure.

It is possible that Lewisite is carcinogenic: arsenic is categorized as a respiratory carcinogen by the International Agency for Research on Cancer, though it has not been confirmed that lewisite is a carcinogen.

Lewisite causes damage to the respiratory tract at levels lower than the odor detection threshold. Early tissue damage causes pain.

Hydrolysis leads to chlorovinylarsonous acid, CVAA.

=== Treatment ===
Dimercaprol, also known as "British anti-lewisite", is the antidote for lewisite. It can be injected to prevent systemic toxicity, but will not prevent injury to the skin, eyes, or mucous membranes. Chemically, dimercaprol binds to the arsenic in lewisite. It is contraindicated in those with peanut allergies as it is usually formulated in peanut oil.

Other treatment for lewisite exposure is primarily supportive. First aid of lewisite exposure consists of decontamination and irrigation of any areas that have been exposed. Other measures can be used as necessary, such as airway management, assisted ventilation, and monitoring of vital signs. In an advanced care setting, supportive care can include fluid and electrolyte replacement. Because the tube may injure or perforate the esophagus, gastric lavage is contraindicated.

=== Long-term effects ===
From one acute exposure, someone who has inhaled lewisite can develop chronic respiratory disease; eye exposure to lewisite can cause permanent visual impairment or blindness.

Chronic exposure to lewisite can cause arsenic poisoning and development of a lewisite allergy. It can also cause long-term illnesses or permanent damage to organs, depending on where the exposure has occurred, including conjunctivitis, photophobia, visual impairment, double vision (diplopia), tearing (lacrimation), dry mucous membranes, garlic breath, burning pain in the nose and mouth, toxic encephalopathy, peripheral neuropathy, seizures, nausea, vomiting, chronic obstructive pulmonary disease (COPD), bronchitis, dermatitis, skin ulcers, basal cell carcinoma, and squamous cell carcinoma.

== Chemical composition ==
Lewisite can be a mixture of molecules with a different number of vinylchloride groups on the arsenic chloride: lewisite itself (2-chlorovinylarsonous dichloride), along with bis(2-chlorovinyl)arsinous chloride (lewisite 2) and tris(2-chlorovinyl)arsine (lewisite 3). In addition, there are sometimes isomeric impurities: lewisite itself is mostly trans-2-chlorovinylarsonous dichloride, but the cis stereoisomer and the constitutional isomer (1-chlorovinylarsonous dichloride) may also be present.

Experimental and computational studies both find that the trans-2-chloro isomer is the most stable, and that the carbon–arsenic bond has a conformation in which the lone pair on the arsenic is approximately aligned with the vinyl group.

== History ==
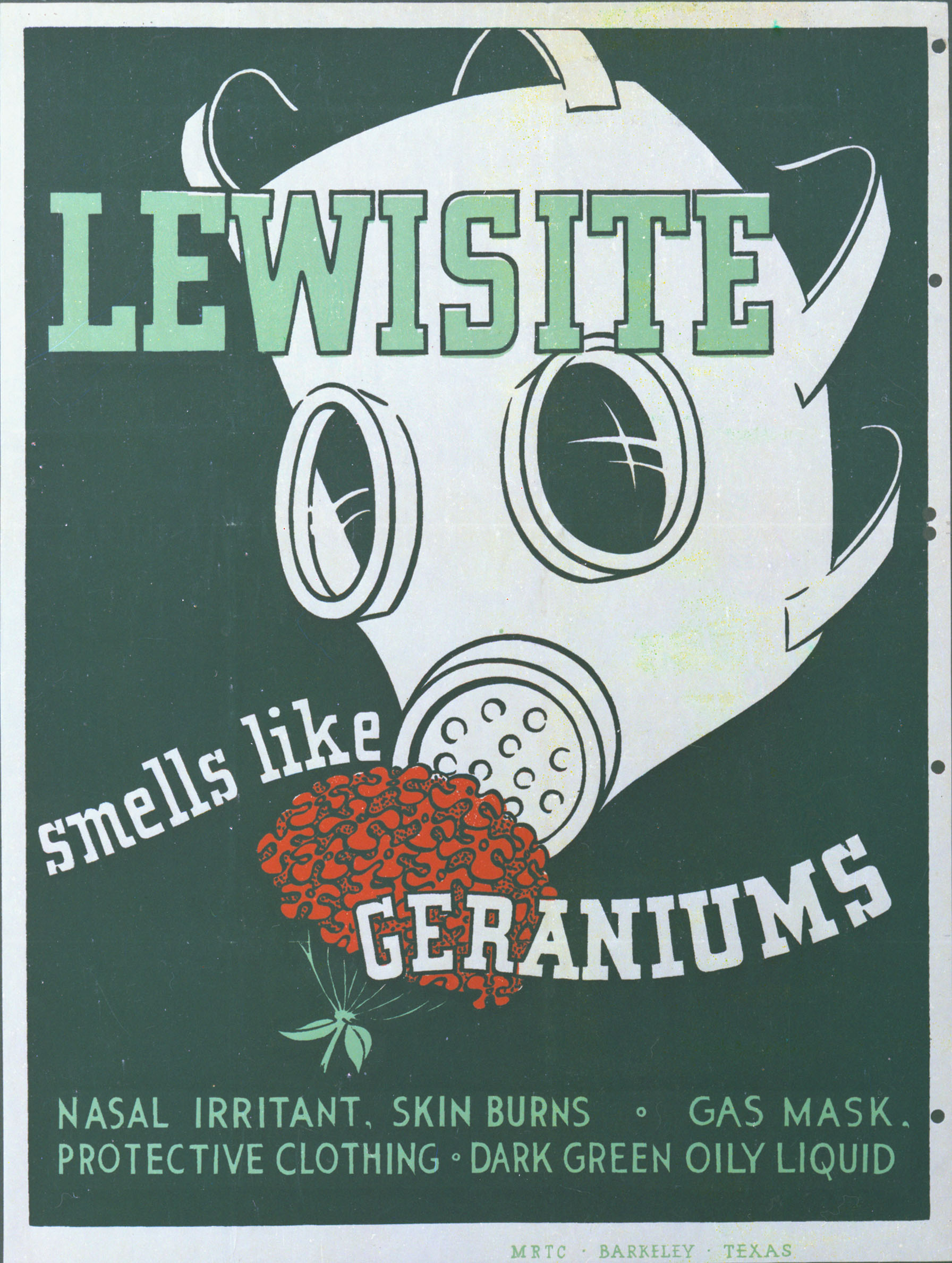
Lewisite identification poster from World War II

Lewisite was synthesized in 1904 by Julius Arthur Nieuwland during studies for his PhD. In his thesis, he described a reaction between acetylene and arsenic trichloride, which led to the formation of lewisite. Exposure to the resulting compound made Nieuwland so ill he was hospitalized for several days.

Lewisite is named after the US chemist and soldier Winford Lee Lewis (1878–1943). In 1918, John Griffin, Julius Arthur Nieuwland's thesis advisor, drew Lewis's attention to Nieuwland's thesis at Maloney Hall, then a chemical laboratory at The Catholic University of America, Washington D.C. Lewis then attempted to purify the compound by distillation but found that the mixture exploded on heating until it was washed with hydrochloric acid.

Lewisite was developed into a secret weapon at a facility located in Cleveland, Ohio (The Cleveland Plant) at East 131st Street and Taft Avenue, and given the name "G-34", which had previously been the code for mustard gas, in order to confuse its development with mustard gas. On November 1, 1918, production began at a plant in Willoughby, Ohio. It was not used in World War I, but Britain experimented with it in the 1920s as the "Dew of Death".

After World War I, the US became interested in lewisite because it was not flammable. Up until World War II, it had the military symbol of "M1", after which it was changed to "L". Field trials with lewisite during World War II demonstrated that casualty concentrations were not achievable under high humidity, due to the rate of hydrolysis and the characteristic odor of the chemical, and the formation of tears forced troops to don masks and avoid contaminated areas. The United States produced about 20,000 tons of lewisite, keeping it on hand primarily as an antifreeze for mustard gas, or to penetrate protective clothing in special situations.

Lewisite was replaced by the mustard gas variant HT (a 60:40 mixture of sulfur mustard and O-Mustard), and was declared obsolete in the 1950s. Lewisite poisoning can be treated effectively with dimercaprol. Most stockpiles of lewisite were neutralised with bleach and dumped into the Gulf of Mexico. The last remaining U.S. stockpiles were located at the Deseret Chemical Depot located outside Salt Lake City, Utah, and were destroyed in January 2012.

Production of quantities greater than 100 grams per year per facility were banned by Schedule 1 of the 1993 Chemical Weapons Convention. When the convention entered force in 1997, the parties declared world-wide stockpiles of 6,747 tonnes. By the end of 2015, 98% of the declared stockpiles had been destroyed.

In 2001, lewisite was found in a World War I weapons dump in Washington, D.C.

In July 2023 a spokesman of the Armed Forces of Ukraine claimed that during the battle of Bakhmut a Russian artillery attack against Ukrainian forces had included lewisite, causing symptoms of nausea, vomiting and in some cases loss of consciousness. However, no information from any sample analysis was published.

== Controversy over Japanese deposits of lewisite in China ==
In mid-2006, China and Japan were negotiating disposal of lewisite stockpile in northeastern China, left by the Japanese military during World War II. People had died over the preceding twenty years from accidental exposure to these stockpiles.

== See also ==
- Ethyldichloroarsine
- Blue Cross (chemical warfare)
