= Bis(2-chloroethyl)sulfide =

Chemical compound formerly used in warfare

Mustard gas

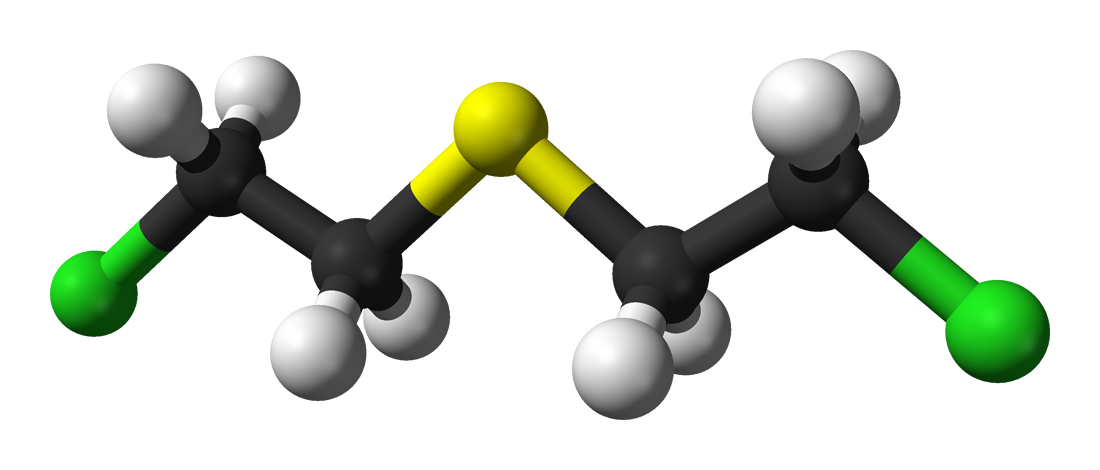

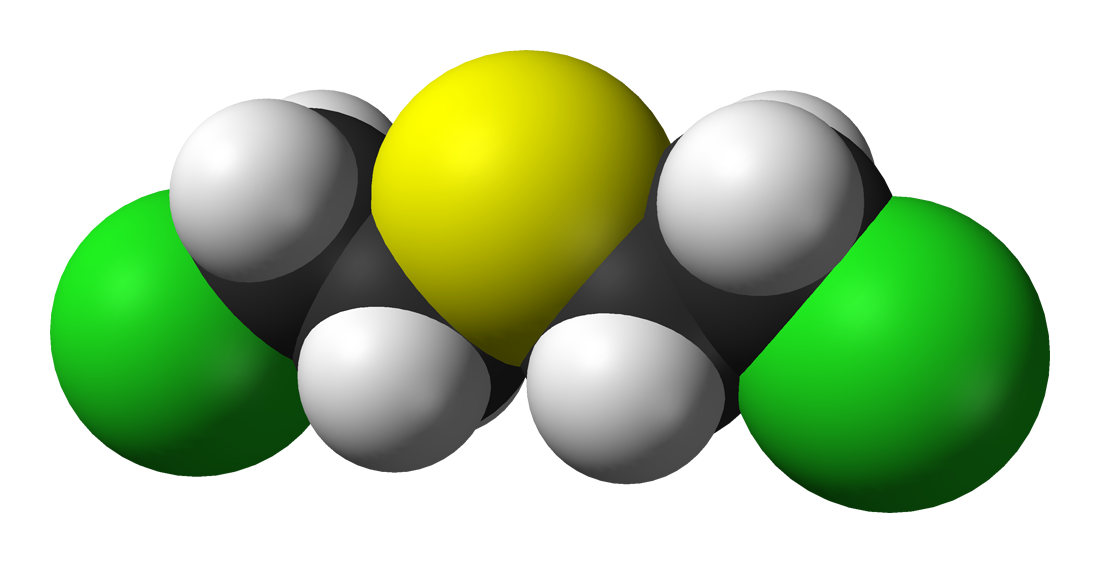

Names
- Preferred IUPAC name 1-Chloro-2-[(2-chloroethyl)sulfanyl]ethane
- Other names Bis(2-chloroethyl) sulfide HD; Iprit; Schwefel-LOST; Lost; Sulfur mustard Senfgas; Yellow cross liquid Yperite; Distilled mustard Mustard T- mixture 1,1'-thiobis[2-chloroethane] Dichlorodiethyl sulfide

Identifiers
CAS Number	505-60-2
3D model (JSmol)	Interactive image
Beilstein Reference	1733595
ChEBI	CHEBI:25434
ChEMBL	ChEMBL455341
ChemSpider	21106142
EC Number	684-527-7
Gmelin Reference	324535
KEGG	C19164
PubChem CID	10461
UNII	T8KEC9FH9P
- InChI: InChI=1S/C4H8Cl2S/c5-1-3-7-4-2-6/h1-4H2 Key: QKSKPIVNLNLAAV-UHFFFAOYSA-N; InChI=1/C4H8Cl2S/c5-1-3-7-4-2-6/h1-4H2 Key: QKSKPIVNLNLAAV-UHFFFAOYAK
- SMILES: ClCCSCCCl

Properties
Chemical formula	C_{4}H_{8}Cl_{2}S
Molar mass	159.07 g·mol^{−1}
Appearance	Colorless if pure. Normally ranges from pale yellow to dark brown. Slight garlic or horseradish type odor.
Density	1.27 g/mL, liquid
Melting point	14.4 °C (57.9 °F; 287.5 K)
Boiling point	217 °C (423 °F; 490 K) begins to decompose at 217 °C (423 °F) and boils at 218 °C (424 °F)
Solubility in water	7.6 mg/L at 20°C
Solubility	Alcohols, ethers, hydrocarbons, lipids, THF

Hazards
- Occupational safety and health (OHS/OSH)
Main hazards	Flammable, toxic, vesicant, carcinogenic, mutagenic
- GHS labelling
Pictograms	(GHS06: Toxic) (GHS07: Exclamation mark)
Signal word	Danger
Hazard statements	H300, H310, H315, H319, H330, H335
Precautionary statements	P260, P262, P264, P270, P271, P280, P284, P301+P310, P302+P350, P302+P352, P304+P340, P305+P351+P338, P310, P312, P320, P321, P330, P332+P313, P337+P313, P361, P362, P363, P403+P233, P405, P501
NFPA 704 (fire diamond)	4 1 1
Flash point	105 °C (221 °F; 378 K)
Safety data sheet (SDS)	External MSDS

Related compounds
Related compounds	Nitrogen mustard, Bis(chloroethyl) ether, Chloromethyl methyl sulfide
- Except where otherwise noted, data are given for materials in their standard state (at 25 °C [77 °F], 100 kPa). verify (what is ?) Infobox references

Bis(2-chloroethyl)sulfide is the organosulfur compound with the formula (ClCH_{2}CH_{2})_{2}S. It is a prominent member of a family of cytotoxic and blister agents known as mustard agents. Sometimes referred to as mustard gas, the term is technically incorrect: bis(2-chloroethyl)sulfide is a liquid at room temperature. In warfare it was dispersed in the form of a fine mist of liquid droplets.

== Synthesis ==
Bis(2-chloroethyl)sulfide has been prepared in a variety of ways. In the Depretz method, sulfur dichloride is treated with ethylene:

SCl_{2} + 2 C_{2}H_{4} → (ClC_{2}H_{4})_{2}S

In the Levinstein process, disulfur dichloride is used instead:

S_{2}Cl_{2} + 2 C_{2}H_{4} → (ClC_{2}H_{4})_{2}S + 1/8 S_{8}

In the Meyer method, thiodiglycol is produced from chloroethanol and sodium sulfide, and the resulting diol is then treated with phosphorus trichloride:

3 (HOC_{2}H_{4})_{2}S + 2 PCl_{3} → 3 (ClC_{2}H_{4})_{2}S + 2 P(OH)_{3}

In the Meyer–Clarke method, concentrated hydrochloric acid (HCl) is used instead of PCl_{3}:

(HOC_{2}H_{4})_{2}S + 2 HCl → (ClC_{2}H_{4})_{2}S + 2 H_{2}O

Thionyl chloride and phosgene, the latter of which is also a choking agent, have also been used as chlorinating agents. These compounds have the added advantage in that if they are used in excess, they remain as impurities in the finished product and can therefore produce additional mechanisms of toxicity.

== Reactions ==
The idealized combustion of mustard gas in oxygen produces hydrochloric acid and sulfuric acid, in addition to carbon dioxide and water:

(ClC_{2}H_{4})_{2}S + 7 O_{2} → 4 CO_{2} + 2 H_{2}O + 2 HCl + H_{2}SO_{4}

Bis(2-chloroethyl)sulfide reacts with sodium hydroxide, giving divinyl sulfide:

(ClC_{2}H_{4})_{2}S + 2 NaOH → (CH_{2}=CH)_{2}S + 2 H_{2}O + 2 NaCl

Sodium ethoxide acts similarly.

== Safety ==
Upon skin contact or inhalation, bis(2-chloroethyl)sulfide is a nonspecific toxin. It is a strong alkylating agent, which affects DNA, RNA, and proteins.

== See also ==
- Bis(chloromethyl) ether
- Half mustard
- Nitrogen mustard
