= Sesquimustard =

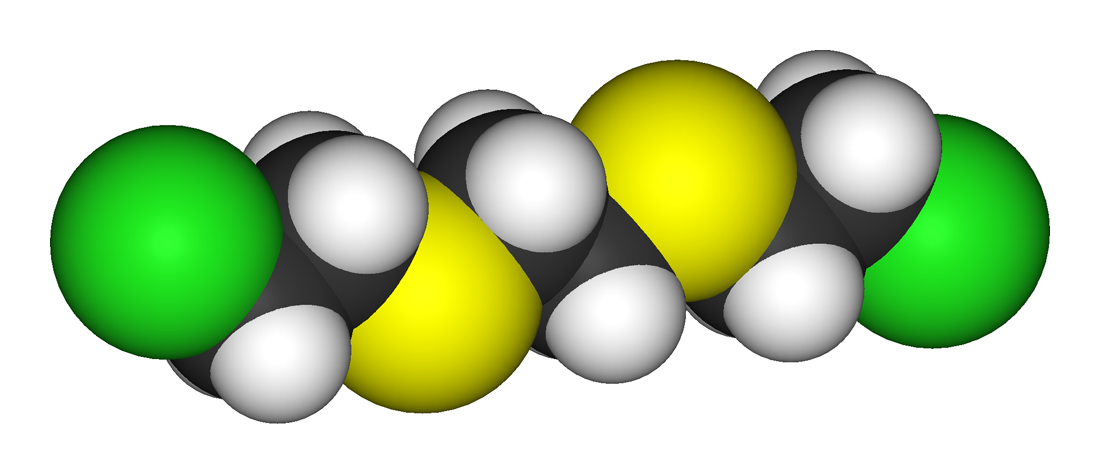

Names
- Preferred IUPAC name 1,2-Bis[(2-chloroethyl)sulfanyl]ethane
- Other names Agent Q TL-86; One-and-one-half mustard

Identifiers
| CAS Number | 3563-36-8 |
| 3D model (JSmol) | Interactive image |
| ChemSpider | 18025 |
| PubChem CID | 19092 |
| UNII | 5Y1NV229PO |
| CompTox Dashboard (EPA) | DTXSID7074793 |
- InChI: InChI=1S/C6H12Cl2S2/c7-1-3-9-5-6-10-4-2-8/h1-6H2 Key: AMGNHZVUZWILSB-UHFFFAOYSA-N
- SMILES: C(CSCCCl)SCCCl

Properties
| Chemical formula | C_{6}H_{12}Cl_{2}S_{2} |
| Molar mass | 219.18 g·mol^{−1} |
| Appearance | white solid (impure samples: pale brown) |
| Melting point | 56.5 °C (133.7 °F; 329.6 K) |
| Solubility in water | Insoluble, slowly degrades |
| Solubility | Alcohols, hydrocarbons, lipids, ethers, THF |
- Except where otherwise noted, data are given for materials in their standard state (at 25 °C [77 °F], 100 kPa). Infobox references

Sesquimustard (military code Q) is the organosulfur compound with the formula (ClCH_{2}CH_{2}SCH_{2})_{2}. Although it is a colorless solid, impure samples are often brown. The compound is a type of mustard gas, a vesicant used as a chemical weapon. From the chemical perspective, the compound is both a thioether and an alkyl chloride.

Because sesquimustard is a solid at room temperature, it is not as easily deployed as related liquid mustards. It was only ever deployed as mixtures with the original mustard, with phosgene, or as a solution. Since 1997, it has been listed under Schedule I of the Chemical Weapons Convention, as a substance with few uses outside of chemical warfare (although since then, it has been found to be useful in chemotherapy).

== See also ==
- Half mustard
- HN3 (nitrogen mustard)
- O-Mustard
- Selenium mustard
