= Mustard gas =

Chemical warfare agent

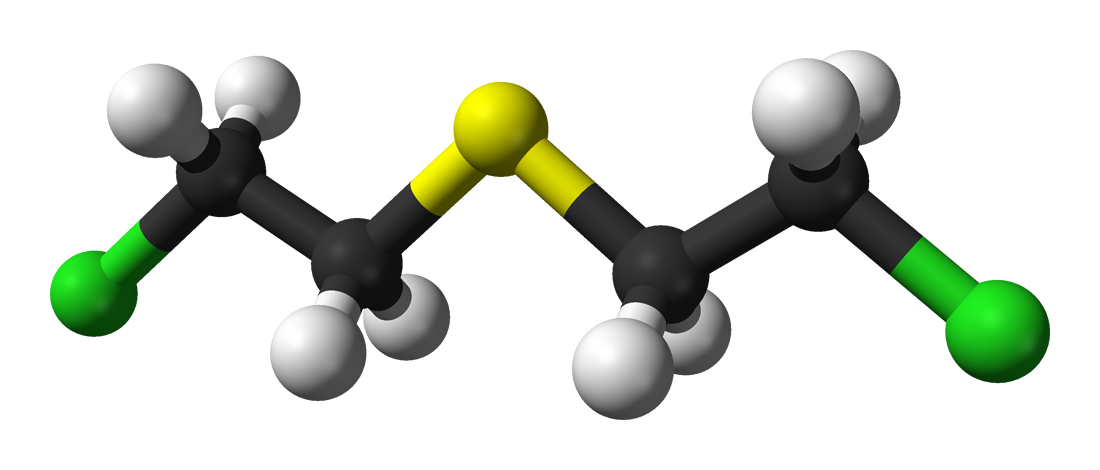

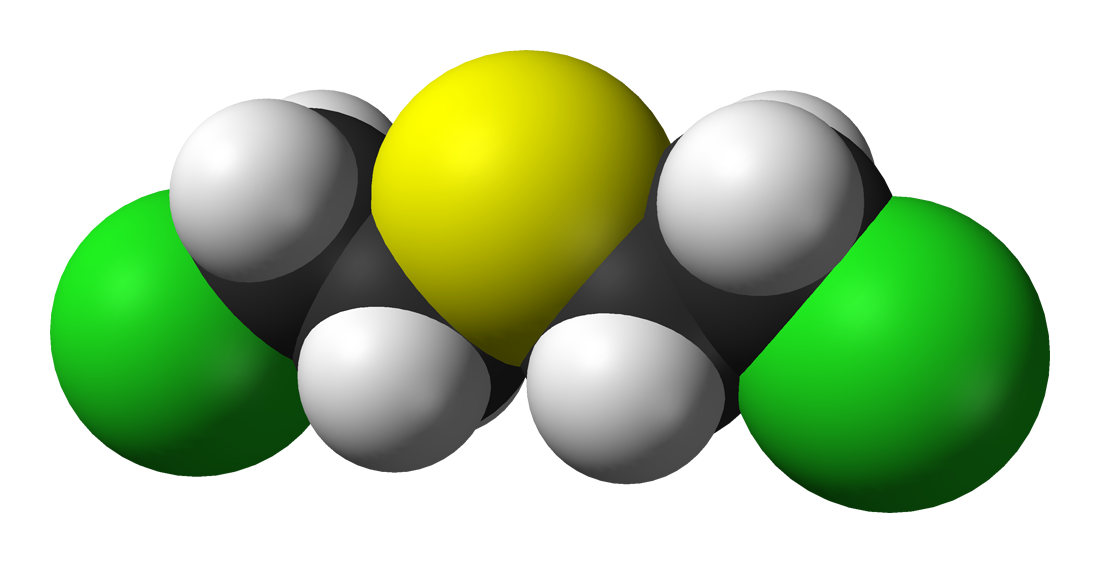

Names
- Preferred IUPAC name 1-Chloro-2-[(2-chloroethyl)sulfanyl]ethane
- Other names Bis(2-chloroethyl) sulfide HD; Iprit; Schwefel-LOST; Lost; Sulfur mustard Senfgas; Yellow cross liquid Yperite; Distilled mustard Mustard T- mixture 1,1'-thiobis[2-chloroethane] Dichlorodiethyl sulfide

Identifiers
CAS Number	505-60-2
3D model (JSmol)	Interactive image
Beilstein Reference	1733595
ChEBI	CHEBI:25434
ChEMBL	ChEMBL455341
ChemSpider	21106142
ECHA InfoCard	100.209.973
EC Number	684-527-7
Gmelin Reference	324535
KEGG	C19164
PubChem CID	10461
UNII	T8KEC9FH9P
CompTox Dashboard (EPA)	DTXSID0037100
- InChI: InChI=1S/C4H8Cl2S/c5-1-3-7-4-2-6/h1-4H2 Key: QKSKPIVNLNLAAV-UHFFFAOYSA-N; InChI=1/C4H8Cl2S/c5-1-3-7-4-2-6/h1-4H2 Key: QKSKPIVNLNLAAV-UHFFFAOYAK
- SMILES: ClCCSCCCl

Properties
Chemical formula	C_{4}H_{8}Cl_{2}S
Molar mass	159.07 g·mol^{−1}
Appearance	Colorless if pure. Normally ranges from pale yellow to dark brown. Slight garlic or horseradish type odor.
Density	1.27 g/mL, liquid
Melting point	14.45 °C (58.01 °F; 287.60 K)
Boiling point	217 °C (423 °F; 490 K) begins to decompose at 217 °C (423 °F) and boils at 218 °C (424 °F)
Solubility in water	7.6 mg/L at 20°C
Solubility	Alcohols, ethers, hydrocarbons, lipids, THF

Hazards
- Occupational safety and health (OHS/OSH)
Main hazards	Flammable, toxic, vesicant, carcinogenic, mutagenic
- GHS labelling
Pictograms	(GHS06: Toxic)
Signal word	Danger
Hazard statements	H300, H310, H315, H319, H330, H335
Precautionary statements	P260, P262, P264, P270, P271, P280, P284, P301+P310, P302+P350, P302+P352, P304+P340, P305+P351+P338, P310, P312, P320, P321, P330, P332+P313, P337+P313, P361, P362, P363, P403+P233, P405, P501
NFPA 704 (fire diamond)	4 1 1
Flash point	105 °C (221 °F; 378 K)
Safety data sheet (SDS)	External MSDS

Related compounds
Related compounds	Nitrogen mustard, Bis(chloroethyl) ether, Chloromethyl methyl sulfide
- Except where otherwise noted, data are given for materials in their standard state (at 25 °C [77 °F], 100 kPa). verify (what is ?) Infobox references

Mustard gas or sulfur mustard are names commonly used for the organosulfur chemical compound bis(2-chloroethyl) sulfide, which has the chemical structure S(CH_{2}CH_{2}Cl)_{2}, as well as other species. In the wider sense, compounds with the substituents −SCH_{2}CH_{2}X or −N(CH_{2}CH_{2}X)_{2} are known as sulfur mustards or nitrogen mustards, respectively, where X = Cl or Br. Such compounds are potent alkylating agents, making mustard gas acutely and severely toxic. Mustard gas is a carcinogen. There is no preventive agent against mustard gas, with protection depending entirely on skin and airways protection, and no antidote exists for mustard poisoning.

Also known as mustard agents, this family of compounds comprises infamous cytotoxins and blister agents with a long history of use as chemical weapons. The name mustard gas is technically incorrect; the substances, when dispersed, are often not gases but a fine mist of liquid droplets that can be readily absorbed through the skin and by inhalation. The skin can be affected by contact with either the liquid or vapor. The rate of penetration into skin is proportional to dose, temperature and humidity.

Sulfur mustards are viscous liquids at room temperature and have an odor resembling mustard plants, garlic, or horseradish, hence the name. When pure, they are colorless, but when used in impure forms, such as in warfare, they are usually yellow-brown. Mustard gases form blisters on exposed skin and in the lungs, often resulting in prolonged illness ending in death.

== Etymology ==
The name of mustard gas derived from its yellow color, smell of mustard, and burning sensation on eyes. The term was first used in 1917 during World War I when Germans used the chemical in combat.

== History as chemical weapons ==
Sulfur mustard is a type of chemical warfare agent. As a chemical weapon, mustard gas has been used in several armed conflicts since World War I, including the Iran–Iraq War. Sulfur-based and nitrogen-based mustard agents are regulated under Schedule 1 of the 1993 Chemical Weapons Convention, as substances with few uses other than in chemical warfare. Mustard agents can be deployed by means of artillery shells, aerial bombs, rockets, or by spraying from aircraft.

== Adverse health effects ==
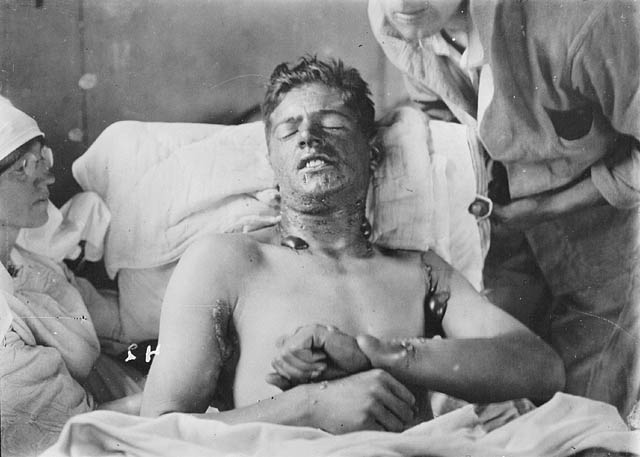
Soldier with moderate mustard agent burns sustained during World War I showing characteristic bullae on the neck, armpit, and hands

Mustard gases have powerful blistering effects on victims. They are also carcinogenic and mutagenic alkylating agents. Their high lipophilicity accelerates their absorption into the body. Because mustard agents often do not elicit immediate symptoms, contaminated areas may appear normal. Within 24 hours of exposure, victims experience intense itching and skin irritation. If this irritation goes untreated, blisters filled with pus can form wherever the agent contacted the skin. As chemical burns, these are severely debilitating. Mustard gas can have the effect of turning a patient's skin different colors due to melanogenesis.

If the victim's eyes were exposed, then they become sore, starting with conjunctivitis (also known as pink eye), after which the eyelids swell, resulting in temporary blindness. Extreme ocular exposure to mustard gas vapors may result in corneal ulceration, anterior chamber scarring, and neovascularization. In these severe and infrequent cases, corneal transplantation has been used as a treatment. If inhaled in high concentrations, mustard agents cause bleeding and blistering within the respiratory system, damaging mucous membranes and causing pulmonary edema. Depending on the level of contamination, mustard agent burns can vary between first and second degree burns. They can also be as severe, disfiguring, and dangerous as third degree burns. Some 80% of sulfur mustard in contact with the skin evaporates, while 10% stays in the skin and 10% is absorbed and circulated in the blood.

The carcinogenic and mutagenic effects of exposure to mustard gas increase the risk of developing cancer later in life. In a study of patients 25 years after wartime exposure to chemical weaponry, c-DNA microarray profiling indicated that 122 genes were significantly mutated in the lungs and airways of mustard gas victims. Those genes all correspond to functions commonly affected by mustard gas exposure, including apoptosis, inflammation, and stress responses.

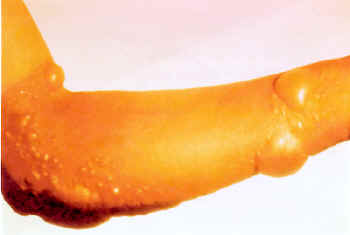
Typical appearance of bullae on an arm caused by vesicant burns

Symptoms of exposure have been extensively documented. There is a considerable amount of information about the effects of exposure to sulfur mustard in humans and animals from the last century from wartime exposures and laboratory testing. Substantial information in the original documents is not readily available. There are numerous reviews of the literature that include early data as well as recent information.

=== Medical management ===
In a rinse-wipe-rinse sequence, skin is decontaminated of mustard gas by washing with liquid soap and water, or an absorbent powder. The eyes should be thoroughly rinsed using saline or clean water. A topical analgesic is used to relieve skin pain during decontamination. For skin lesions, topical treatments, such as calamine lotion, steroids, and oral antihistamines are used to relieve itching. Larger blisters are irrigated repeatedly with saline or soapy water, then treated with an antibiotic and petroleum gauze.

Mustard agent burns do not heal quickly and (as with other types of burns) present a risk of sepsis caused by pathogens such as Staphylococcus aureus and Pseudomonas aeruginosa. The mechanisms behind mustard gas's effect on endothelial cells are still being studied, but recent studies have shown that high levels of exposure can induce high rates of both necrosis and apoptosis. In vitro tests have shown that at low concentrations of mustard gas, where apoptosis is the predominant result of exposure, pretreatment with 50 mM N-acetyl-L-cysteine (NAC) was able to decrease the rate of apoptosis. NAC protects actin filaments from reorganization by mustard gas, demonstrating that actin filaments play a large role in the severe burns observed in victims.

A British nurse treating soldiers with mustard agent burns during World War I commented:

They cannot be bandaged or touched. We cover them with a tent of propped-up sheets. Gas burns must be agonizing because usually the other cases do not complain, even with the worst wounds, but gas cases are invariably beyond endurance and they cannot help crying out.

=== Mechanism of cellular toxicity ===
Mustard gas alkylating an amino group via conversion to a sulfonium ion (2-chloroethylthiiranium)

Sulfur mustards readily eliminate chloride ions by intramolecular nucleophilic substitution to form cyclic sulfonium ions. These very reactive intermediates tend to permanently alkylate nucleotides in DNA strands, which can prevent cellular division, leading to programmed cell death. Alternatively, if cell death is not immediate, the damaged DNA can lead to the development of cancer. Oxidative stress is another pathology involved in mustard gas toxicity.

Various compounds with the structural subgroup BC_{2}H_{4}X, where X is any leaving group and B is a Lewis base, have a common name of mustard. Such compounds can form cyclic "onium" ions (sulfonium, ammonium, etc.) that are good alkylating agents. These compounds include bis(2-haloethyl)ethers (oxygen mustards), the (2-haloethyl)amines (nitrogen mustards), and sesquimustard, which has two α-chloroethyl thioether groups (ClC_{2}H_{4}S−) connected by an ethylene bridge (−C_{2}H_{4}−). These compounds have a similar ability to alkylate DNA, but their physical properties vary.

== Formulations ==
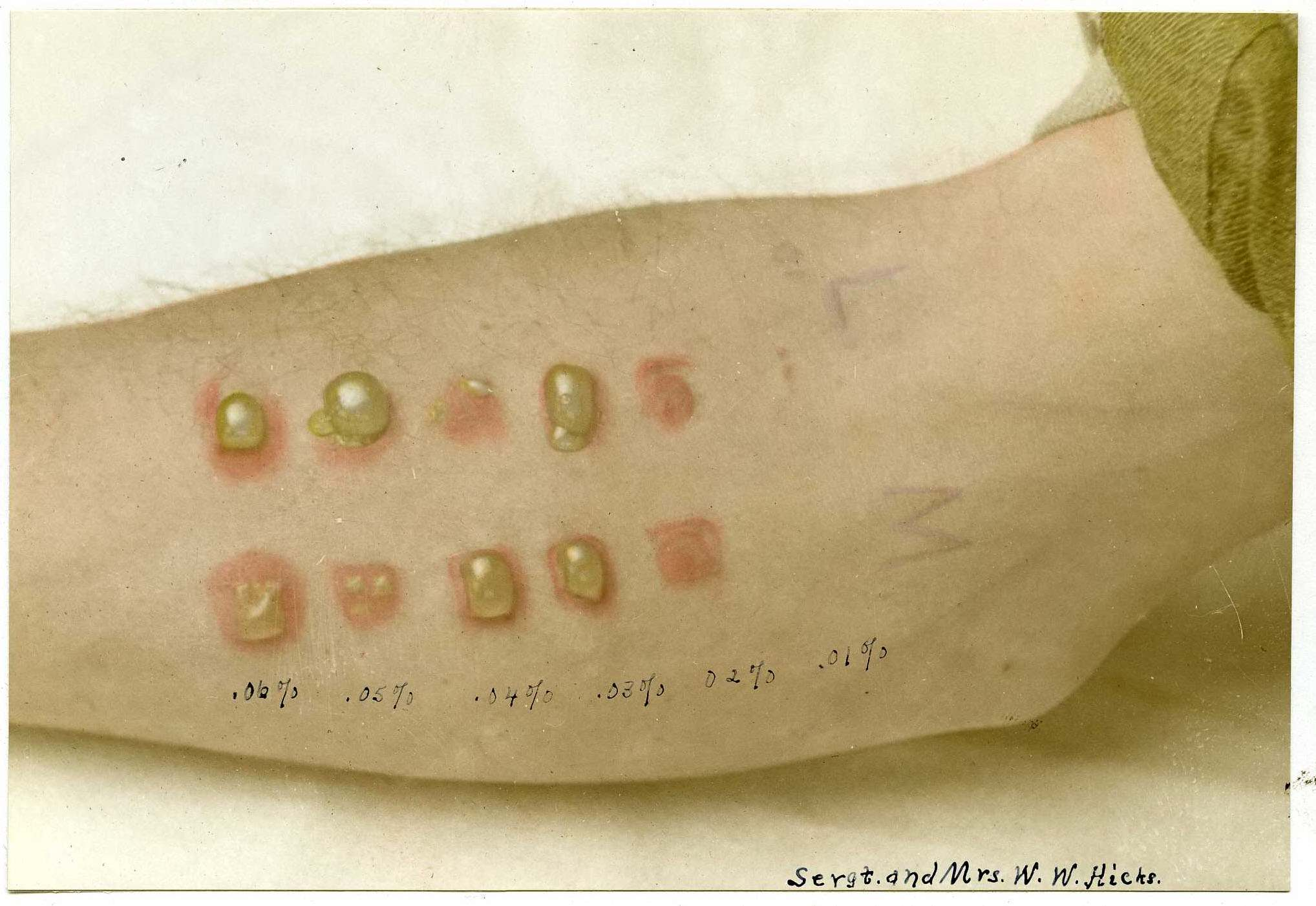
Lewisite (top row) and mustard gas (bottom row) test with concentrations from 0.01% to 0.06%

In its history, various types and mixtures of mustard gas have been employed. These include:

- H – Also known as HS ("Hun Stuff") or Levinstein mustard. This is named after the inventor of the "quick but dirty" Levinstein Process for manufacture, reacting dry ethylene with disulfur dichloride under controlled conditions. Undistilled mustard gas contains 20–30% impurities, which means it does not store as well as HD. Also, as it decomposes, it increases in vapor pressure, making the munition it is contained in likely to split, especially along a seam, releasing the agent to the atmosphere.
- HD – Codenamed Pyro by the British, and Distilled Mustard by the US. Distilled mustard of 95% or higher purity. The term "mustard gas" usually refers to this variety of mustard.
- HT – Codenamed Runcol by the British, and Mustard T- mixture by the US. A mixture of 60% HD mustard and 40% O-mustard, a related vesicant with lower freezing point, lower volatility and similar vesicant characteristics.
- HL – A blend of distilled mustard (HD) and lewisite (L), originally intended for use in winter conditions due to its lower freezing point compared to the pure substances. The lewisite component of HL was used as a form of antifreeze.
- HQ – A blend of distilled mustard (HD) and sesquimustard (Q).
- Yellow Cross – any of several blends containing sulfur mustard. Named for the yellow cross painted on artillery shells.

== Commonly-stockpiled mustard agents (class) ==
Chemical	Code	Trivial name	CAS number	PubChem	Structure
Bis(2-chloroethyl)sulfide	H, HD	Mustard	505-60-2	CID 10461 from PubChem	
1,2-Bis(2-chloroethylsulfanyl) ethane	Q	Sesquimustard	3563-36-8	CID 19092 from PubChem	
2-Chloroethyl ethyl sulfide		Half mustard	693-07-2	CID 12733 from PubChem	
Bis(2-(2-chloroethylsulfanyl)ethyl) ether	T	O-mustard	63918-89-8	CID 45452 from PubChem	
2-Chloroethyl chloromethyl sulfide			2625-76-5		
Bis(2-chloroethylsulfanyl) methane	HK		63869-13-6		
1,3-Bis(2-chloroethylsulfanyl) propane			63905-10-2		
1,4-Bis(2-chloroethylsulfanyl) butane			142868-93-7		
1,5-Bis(2-chloroethylsulfanyl) pentane			142868-94-8		
Bis((2-chloroethylsulfanyl)methyl) ether			63918-90-1		

== History ==
=== Development ===
Mustard gases were possibly developed as early as 1822 by César-Mansuète Despretz (1798–1863). Despretz described the reaction of sulfur dichloride and ethylene but never made mention of any irritating properties of the reaction product. In 1854, another French chemist, Alfred Riche (1829–1908), repeated this procedure, also without describing any adverse physiological properties. In 1860, the British scientist Frederick Guthrie synthesized and characterized the mustard agent compound and noted its irritating properties, especially in tasting. Also in 1860, chemist Albert Niemann, known as a pioneer in cocaine chemistry, repeated the reaction, and recorded blister-forming properties. In 1886, Viktor Meyer published a paper describing a synthesis that produced good yields. He combined 2-chloroethanol with aqueous potassium sulfide, and then treated the resulting thiodiglycol with phosphorus trichloride. The purity of this compound was much higher and consequently the adverse health effects upon exposure were much more severe. These symptoms presented themselves in his assistant, and in order to rule out the possibility that his assistant was suffering from a mental illness (psychosomatic symptoms), Meyer had this compound tested on laboratory rabbits, most of which died. In 1913, the English chemist Hans Thacher Clarke (known for the Eschweiler-Clarke reaction) replaced the phosphorus trichloride with hydrochloric acid in Meyer's formulation while working with Emil Fischer in Berlin. Clarke was hospitalized for two months for burns after one of his flasks broke. According to Meyer, Fischer's report on this accident to the German Chemical Society sent the German Empire on the road to chemical weapons.

The German Empire during World War I relied on the Meyer-Clarke method because 2-chloroethanol was readily available from the German dye industry of that time.

=== Use ===
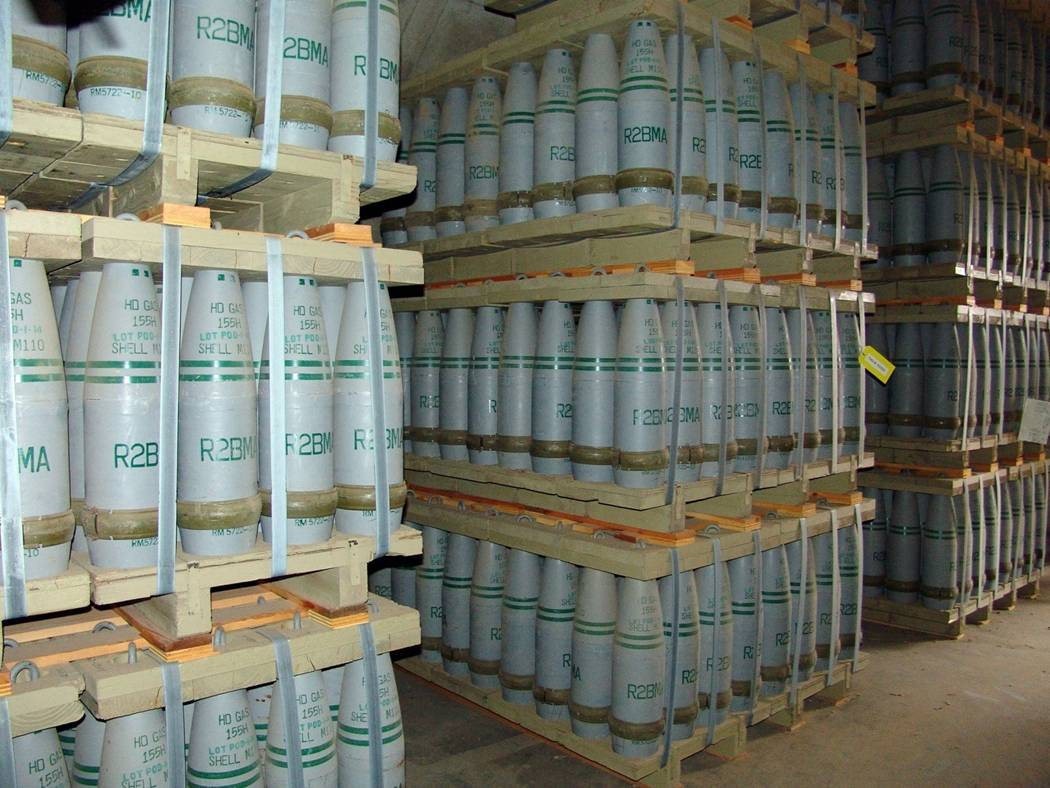
Pallets of 155 mm artillery shells containing "HD" (distilled mustard gas agent) at the Pueblo Chemical Depot. The distinctive color-coding scheme on each shell is visible.

Mustard gas was first used in World War I by the German army against British and Canadian soldiers near Ypres, Belgium, on July 12, 1917, and later also against the French Second Army. Yperite is "a name used by the French, because the compound was first used at Ypres." The Allies used mustard gas for the first time on November 1917 at Cambrai, France, after the armies had captured a stockpile of German mustard shells. It took the British more than a year to develop their own mustard agent weapon, with production of the chemicals centred on Avonmouth Docks (the only option available to the British was the Despretz–Niemann–Guthrie process).

Mustard gas was originally assigned the name LOST, after the scientists Wilhelm Lommel and Wilhelm Steinkopf, who developed a method of large-scale production for the Imperial German Army in 1916.

Mustard gas was dispersed as an aerosol in a mixture with other chemicals, giving it a yellow-brown color. Mustard agent has also been dispersed in such munitions as aerial bombs, land mines, mortar rounds, artillery shells, and rockets. Exposure to mustard agent was lethal in about 1% of cases. Its effectiveness was as an incapacitating agent. The early countermeasures against mustard agent were relatively ineffective, since a soldier wearing a gas mask was not protected against absorbing it through his skin and being blistered. A common countermeasure was using a urine-soaked mask or facecloth to prevent or reduce injury, a readily available remedy attested by soldiers in documentaries (e.g., They Shall Not Grow Old in 2018) and others (such as forward aid nurses) interviewed between 1947 and 1981 by the British Broadcasting Corporation for various World War One history programs; however, the effectiveness of this measure is unclear.

Mustard gas can remain in the ground for weeks, and it continues to cause ill effects. If mustard agent contaminates one's clothing and equipment while cold, then other people with whom they share an enclosed space could become poisoned as contaminated items warm up enough material to become an airborne toxic agent. An example of this was depicted in a British and Canadian documentary about life in the trenches, particularly once the "sousterrain" (subways and berthing areas underground) were completed in Belgium and France. Towards the end of World War I, mustard agent was used in high concentrations as an area-denial weapon that forced troops to abandon heavily contaminated areas.

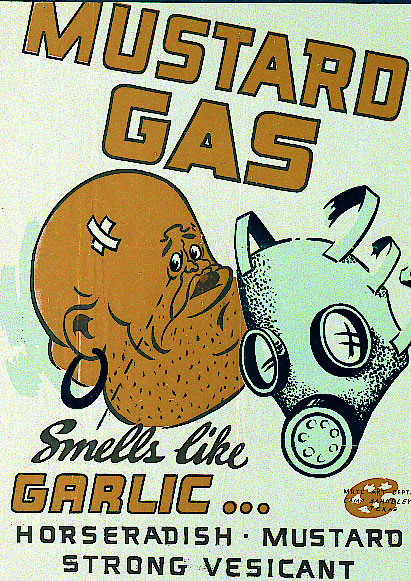
US Army World War II gas identification poster, c. 1941–1945

Since World War I, mustard gas has been used in several wars and other conflicts, usually against people who cannot retaliate in kind:

- United Kingdom against the Red Army in 1919
- Alleged British use in Mesopotamia in 1920
- Spain against the Rifian resistance in Morocco during the Rif War of 1921–27 (see also: Spanish use of chemical weapons in the Rif War)
- Italy in Libya in 1930
- The Soviet Union in Xinjiang, Republic of China, during the Soviet Invasion of Xinjiang against the 36th Division (National Revolutionary Army) in 1934, and also in the Xinjiang War (1937) in 1936–37
- Italy against Abyssinia (now Ethiopia) in the 1935–1936
- The Empire of Japan against China in the 1937–1945
- The US military conducted experiments with chemical weapons like lewisite and mustard gas on Japanese American, Puerto Rican and African Americans in the US military in World War II to see how non-white races would react to being mustard gassed, with Rollin Edwards describing it as "It felt like you were on fire, guys started screaming and hollering and trying to break out. And then some of the guys fainted. And finally they opened the door and let us out, and the guys were just, they were in bad shape." and "It took all the skin off your hands. Your hands just rotted".
- After World War II, stockpiled mustard gas was dumped by South African military personnel under the command of William Bleloch off Port Elizabeth, resulting in several cases of burns among local trawler crews.
- The United States Government tested effectiveness on US Naval recruits in a laboratory setting at The Great Lakes Naval Base, June 3, 1945
- The 2 December 1943 air raid on Bari destroyed an Allied stockpile of mustard gas on the SS John Harvey, killing 83 and hospitalizing 628.
- Egypt against North Yemen in 1963–1967
- Iraq against Kurds in the town of Halabja during the Halabja chemical attack in 1988
- Iraq against Iranians in 1983–1988
- Possibly in Sudan against insurgents in the civil war, in 1995 and 1997.
- In the Iraq War, abandoned stockpiles of mustard gas shells were destroyed in the open air, and were used against Coalition forces in roadside bombs.
- By ISIS forces against Kurdish forces in Iraq in August 2015.
- By ISIS against another rebel group in the town of Mare' in 2015.
- According to Syrian state media, by ISIS against the Syrian Army during the battle in Deir ez-Zor in 2016.

The use of toxic gases or other chemicals, including mustard gas, during warfare is known as chemical warfare, and this kind of warfare was prohibited by the Geneva Protocol of 1925, and also by the later Chemical Weapons Convention of 1993. The latter agreement also prohibits the development, production, stockpiling, and sale of such weapons.

In September 2012, a US official stated that the rebel militant group ISIS was manufacturing and using mustard gas in Syria and Iraq, which was allegedly confirmed by the group's head of chemical weapons development, Sleiman Daoud al-Afari, who has since been captured.

==== Development of the first chemotherapy drug ====
As early as 1919 it was known that mustard agent was a suppressor of hematopoiesis. In addition, autopsies performed on 75 soldiers who had died of mustard agent during World War I were done by researchers from the University of Pennsylvania who reported decreased counts of white blood cells. This led the American Office of Scientific Research and Development (OSRD) to finance the biology and chemistry departments at Yale University to conduct research on the use of chemical warfare during World War II.

As a part of this effort, the group investigated nitrogen mustard as a therapy for Hodgkin's lymphoma and other types of lymphoma and leukemia, and this compound was tried out on its first human patient in December 1942. The results of this study were not published until 1946, when they were declassified. In a parallel track, after the air raid on Bari in December 1943, the doctors of the U.S. Army noted that white blood cell counts were reduced in their patients. Some years after World War II was over, the incident in Bari and the work of the Yale University group with nitrogen mustard converged, and this prompted a search for other similar chemical compounds. Due to its use in previous studies, the nitrogen mustard called "HN2" became the first cancer chemotherapy drug, chlormethine (also known as mechlorethamine, mustine) to be used. Chlormethine and other mustard gas molecules are still used to this day as a chemotherapy agent albeit they have largely been replaced with more safe chemotherapy drugs like cisplatin and carboplatin.

==== Disposal ====
In the United States, storage and incineration of mustard gas and other chemical weapons were carried out by the U.S. Army Chemical Materials Agency. Disposal projects at the two remaining American chemical weapons sites were carried out near Richmond, Kentucky, and Pueblo, Colorado. The last of the declared mustard weapons stockpile of the United States was destroyed on June 22, 2023 in Pueblo with other remaining chemical weapons being destroyed later in 2023.

New detection techniques are being developed in order to detect the presence of mustard gas and its metabolites. The technology is portable and detects small quantities of the hazardous waste and its oxidized products, which are notorious for harming unsuspecting civilians. The immunochromatographic assay would eliminate the need for expensive, time-consuming lab tests and enable easy-to-read tests to protect civilians from sulfur-mustard dumping sites.

In 1946, 10,000 drums of mustard gas (2,800 tonnes) stored at the production facility of Stormont Chemicals in Cornwall, Ontario, Canada, were loaded onto 187 boxcars for the 900 miles (1,400 km) journey to be buried at sea on board a 400 foot (120 m) long barge 40 miles (64 km) south of Sable Island, southeast of Halifax, at a depth of 600 fathoms (1,100 m). The dump location is 42 degrees, 50 minutes north by 60 degrees, 12 minutes west.

A large British stockpile of old mustard agent that had been made and stored since World War I at M. S. Factory, Valley near Rhydymwyn in Flintshire, Wales, was destroyed in 1958.

Most of the mustard gas found in Germany after World War II was dumped into the Baltic Sea. Between 1966 and 2002, fishermen have found about 700 chemical weapons in the region of Bornholm, most of which contain mustard gas. One of the more frequently dumped weapons was "Sprühbüchse 37" (SprüBü37, Spray Can 37, 1937 being the year of its fielding with the German Army). These weapons contain mustard gas mixed with a thickener, which gives it a tar-like viscosity. When the content of the SprüBü37 comes in contact with water, only the mustard gas in the outer layers of the lumps of viscous mustard hydrolyzes, leaving behind amber-colored residues that still contain most of the active mustard gas. On mechanically breaking these lumps (e.g., with the drag board of a fishing net or by the human hand) the enclosed mustard gas is still as active as it had been at the time the weapon was dumped. These lumps, when washed ashore, can be mistaken for amber, which can lead to severe health problems. Artillery shells containing mustard gas and other toxic ammunition from World War I (as well as conventional explosives) can still be found in France and Belgium. These were formerly disposed of by explosion undersea, but since the current environmental regulations prohibit this, the French government is building an automated factory to dispose of the accumulation of chemical shells.

In 1972, the U.S. Congress banned the practice of disposing of chemical weapons into the ocean by the United States. About 29,000 tons of nerve and mustard agents had already been dumped into the ocean off the United States by the U.S. Army. According to a report created in 1998 by William Brankowitz, a deputy project manager in the U.S. Army Chemical Materials Agency, the army created at least 26 chemical weapons dumping sites in the ocean offshore from at least 11 states on both the East Coast and the West Coast (in Operation CHASE, Operation Geranium, etc.). In addition, due to poor recordkeeping, about one-half of the sites have only their rough locations known.

In June 1997, India declared its stock of chemical weapons of 1,044 tonnes (1,151 short tons) of mustard gas. By the end of 2006, India had destroyed more than 75 percent of its chemical weapons/material stockpile and was granted extension for destroying the remaining stocks by April 2009 and was expected to achieve 100 percent destruction within that time frame. India informed the United Nations in May 2009 that it had destroyed its stockpile of chemical weapons in compliance with the international Chemical Weapons Convention. With this India has become the third country after South Korea and Albania to do so. This was cross-checked by inspectors of the United Nations.

Producing or stockpiling mustard gas is prohibited by the Chemical Weapons Convention. When the convention entered force in 1997, the parties declared worldwide stockpiles of 17,440 tonnes of mustard gas. As of December 2015, 86% of these stockpiles had been destroyed.

A significant portion of the United States' mustard agent stockpile was stored at the Edgewood Area of Aberdeen Proving Ground in Maryland. Approximately 1,621 tons of mustard agents were stored in one-ton containers on the base under heavy guard. A chemical neutralization plant was built on the proving ground and neutralized the last of this stockpile in February 2005. This stockpile had priority because of the potential for quick reduction of risk to the community. The nearest schools were fitted with overpressurization machinery to protect the students and faculty in the event of a catastrophic explosion and fire at the site. These projects, as well as planning, equipment, and training assistance, were provided to the surrounding community as a part of the Chemical Stockpile Emergency Preparedness Program (CSEPP), a joint program of the Army and the Federal Emergency Management Agency (FEMA). Unexploded shells containing mustard gases and other chemical agents are still present in several test ranges in proximity to schools in the Edgewood area, but the smaller amounts of poison gas (4 to 14 pounds (1.8 to 6.4 kg)) present considerably lower risks. These remnants are being detected and excavated systematically for disposal. The U.S. Army Chemical Materials Agency oversaw disposal of several other chemical weapons stockpiles located across the United States in compliance with international chemical weapons treaties. These include the complete incineration of the chemical weapons stockpiled in Alabama, Arkansas, Indiana, and Oregon. Earlier, this agency had also completed destruction of the chemical weapons stockpile located on Johnston Atoll located south of Hawaii in the Pacific Ocean. The largest mustard agent stockpile, at approximately 6,200 short tons, was stored at the Deseret Chemical Depot in northern Utah. The incineration of this stockpile began in 2006. In May 2011, the last of the mustard agents in the stockpile were incinerated at the Deseret Chemical Depot, and the last artillery shells containing mustard gas were incinerated in January 2012.

In 2008, many empty aerial bombs that contained mustard gas were found in an excavation at the Marrangaroo Army Base just west of Sydney, Australia. In 2009, a mining survey near Chinchilla, Queensland, uncovered 144 105-millimeter howitzer shells, some containing "Mustard H", that had been buried by the U.S. Army during World War II.

In 2014, a collection of 200 bombs was found near the Flemish villages of Passendale and Moorslede. The majority of the bombs were filled with mustard agents. The bombs were left over from the German army and were meant to be used in the Battle of Passchendaele in World War I. It was the largest collection of chemical weapons ever found in Belgium.

A large amount of chemical weapons, including mustard gas, was found in a neighborhood of Washington, D.C. The cleanup was completed in 2021.

==== Post-war accidental exposure ====
In 2002, an archaeologist at the Presidio Trust archaeology lab in San Francisco was exposed to mustard gas, which had been dug up at the Presidio of San Francisco, a former military base.

In 2010, a clamming boat pulled up some old artillery shells of World War I from the Atlantic Ocean south of Long Island, New York. Multiple fishermen suffered from blistering and respiratory irritation severe enough to require hospitalization.

=== WWII-era tests on men ===
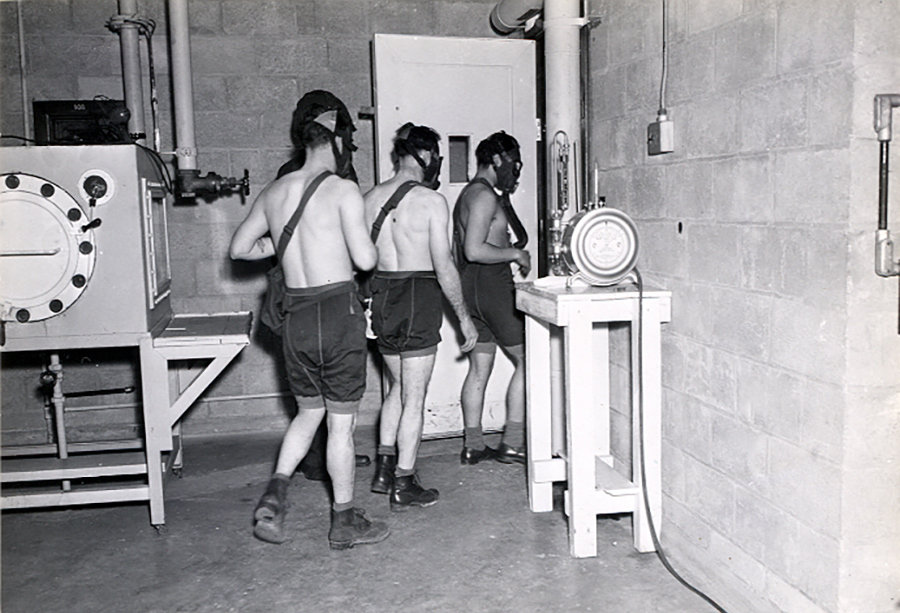
Mustard gas test subjects enter gas chamber in Edgewood Arsenal, March 1945

From 1943 to 1944, mustard agent experiments were performed on Australian service volunteers in tropical Queensland, Australia, by Royal Australian Engineers, British Army and American experimenters, resulting in some severe injuries. One test site, the Brook Islands National Park, was chosen to simulate Pacific islands held by the Imperial Japanese Army. These experiments were the subject of the documentary film Keen as Mustard.

The United States tested sulfur mustards and other chemical agents including nitrogen mustards and lewisite on up to 60,000 servicemen during and after WWII. The experiments were classified secret and as with Agent Orange, claims for medical care and compensation were routinely denied, even after the WWII-era tests were declassified in 1993. The Department of Veterans Affairs stated that it would contact 4,000 surviving test subjects but failed to do so, eventually only contacting 600. Skin cancer, severe eczema, leukemia, and chronic breathing problems plagued the test subjects, some of whom were as young as 19 at the time of the tests, until their deaths, but even those who had previously filed claims with the VA went without compensation.

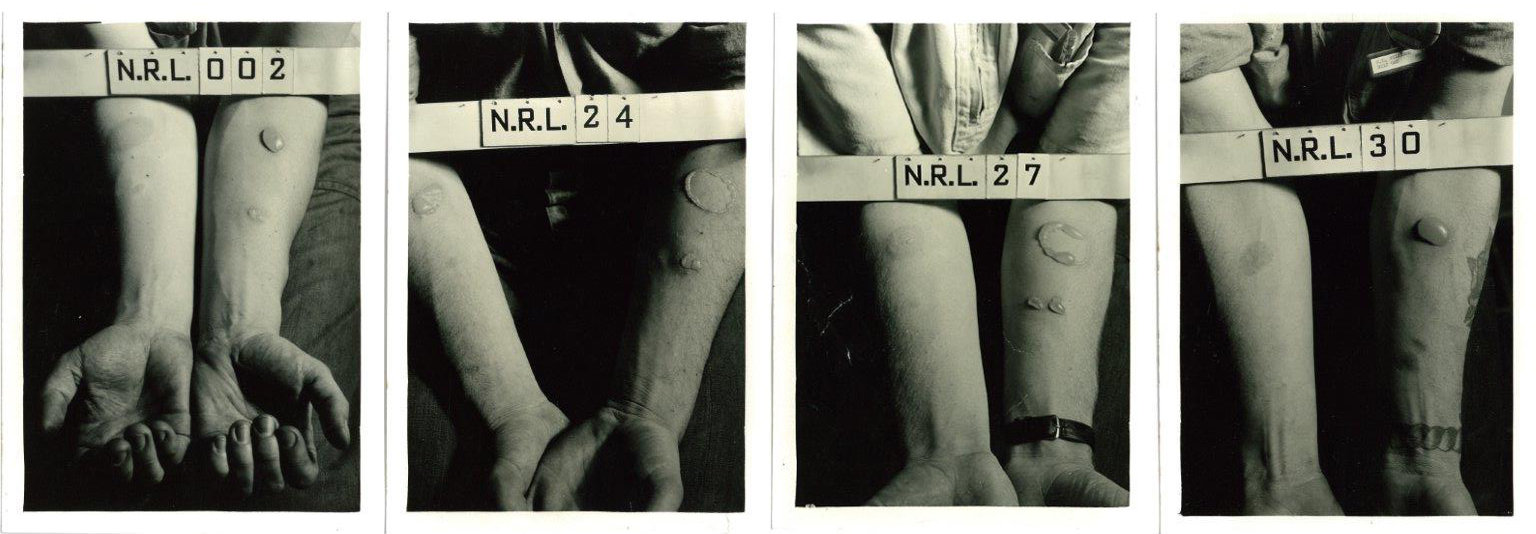
Arms of four test subjects after exposure to nitrogen mustard and lewisite agents

African American servicemen were tested alongside white men in separate trials to determine whether their skin color would afford them a degree of immunity to the agents, and Nisei servicemen, some of whom had joined after their release from Japanese American Internment Camps, were tested to determine susceptibility of Japanese military personnel to these agents. These tests also included Puerto Rican subjects.

=== Detection in biological fluids ===
Concentrations of thiodiglycol in urine have been used to confirm a diagnosis of chemical poisoning in hospitalized victims. The presence in urine of 1,1'-sulfonylbismethylthioethane (SBMTE), a conjugation product with glutathione, is considered a more specific marker, since this metabolite is not found in specimens from unexposed persons. In one case, intact mustard gas was detected in postmortem fluids and tissues of a man who died one week post-exposure.

== See also ==
- Bis(chloromethyl) ether
- Chlorine gas
- Keen as Mustard
- Phosgene oxime
- Poison gas in World War I
- Rawalpindi experiments
- Selenium mustard
