= C4H8S =

The molecular formula C_{4}H_{8}S (molar mass: 88.17 g/mol, exact mass: 88.0347 u) may refer to:

- Allyl methyl sulfide
- Tetrahydrothiophene, also known as thiophane, thiolane, or THT
