= Operation Geranium =

American military operation (1948)

Operation Geranium was a U.S. Army mission that dumped more than 3,000 tons of the chemical agent lewisite into the ocean off the Florida coast in 1948.

== Operation ==
Operation Geranium occurred from 15 – 20 December 1948 and involved the dumping of approximately 3,150 tons of stockpiled lewisite into the Atlantic Ocean. "Geranium" was so called because lewisite has an odor reminiscent of geraniums. The materials dumped consisted of two types of bulk container, 60 were of the M14 variety, and another 3,700 bulk containers were dumped as well. The lewisite was shipped to Charleston from the Gulf Chemical Warfare Depot. The lewisite was then loaded aboard a World War II merchant ship, the SS Joshua Alexander. The lewisite was then dumped, at sea, 300 miles off the coast of Florida.

== Dumping ==
Sea dumping was used by the U.S. Army to dispose of World War II lewisite stocks prior to Geranium. One such dumping operation was reported on by The New York Times in 1946, 10,000 tons of lewisite was dumped about 160 miles (260 km) off the Charleston, South Carolina coast. Before Operation Geranium, however, lewisite dumping was mostly accomplished by simply dropping loose munitions overboard. In this operation, the Army loaded the merchant hulk with the lewisite containers, sailed the vessel out to sea and then scuttled the ship with the munitions aboard. Most of the 20,000 tons of lewisite produced during World War II by the U.S. was disposed of by dumping at sea. This method of operation and disposal was not used again for some time, though the Army did employ it again.

== See also ==
- Operation CHASE
