= Divinyl sulfide =

Names
- Preferred IUPAC name (Ethenylsulfanyl)ethene
- Other names vinyl sulfide, DVS

Identifiers
CAS Number	627-51-0
3D model (JSmol)	Interactive image
ChEBI	CHEBI:177668
ChemSpider	11817
PubChem CID	12321
UNII	CL87X0NVJA
CompTox Dashboard (EPA)	DTXSID10211766
- InChI: InChI=1S/C4H6S/c1-3-5-4-2/h3-4H,1-2H2 Key: UIYCHXAGWOYNNA-UHFFFAOYSA-N
- SMILES: C=CSC=C

Properties
Chemical formula	C_{4}H_{6}S
Molar mass	86.15 g·mol^{−1}
Appearance	colorless liquid
Density	0.9098 g/cm^{3} (20 °C)
Melting point	20 °C (68 °F; 293 K)
Boiling point	84 °C (183 °F; 357 K)
- Except where otherwise noted, data are given for materials in their standard state (at 25 °C [77 °F], 100 kPa). Infobox references

Divinyl sulfide is the organosulfur compound with the formula S(CH=CH_{2})_{2}. A colorless liquid with a faint odor, it is found in some species of Allium.

== Preparation ==
Divinyl sulfide is formed from hydrogen sulfide and acetylene. Divinylsulfide can arise when inadvertently when acetylene is generated by hydrolysis of technical-grade calcium carbide contaminated with calcium sulfide.

Divinylsulfide was first prepared in 1920 by the reaction of bis(2-chloroethyl)sulfide with sodium ethoxide:

(ClCH_{2}CH_{2})_{2}S + 2 NaOEt → (CH_{2}=CH)_{2}S + 2 EtOH + 2 NaCl

== Monovinyl sulfides ==
With the formula CH_{2}=CHSR, a variety of monovinyl sulfides are known. They can arise by the dehydrohalogenation of -2-haloethyl phenyl sulfides. One example is phenyl vinyl sulfide. Alkyl ketones react with thiols in the presence of phosphorus pentoxide to give vinyl sulfides:

RSH + CH_{3}C(O)R' → CH_{2}=C(SR)R' + H_{2}O
