= Bis(2-chloroethyl)selenide =

Selenium mustard
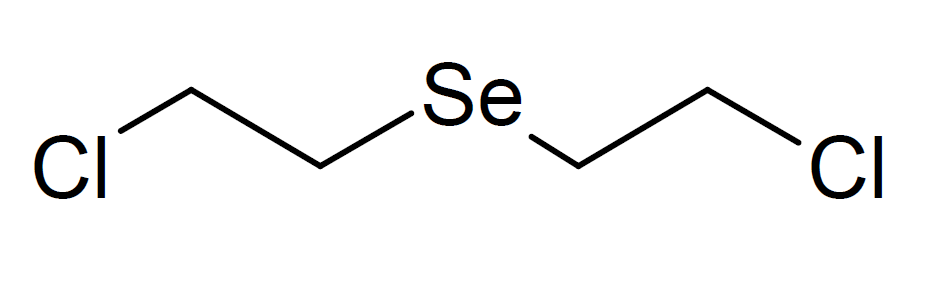

Names
- Preferred IUPAC name 1-Chloro-2-[(2-chloroethyl)selanyl]ethane

Identifiers
CAS Number	4730-83-0
3D model (JSmol)	Interactive image
ChEMBL	ChEMBL288408
ChemSpider	23134672
PubChem CID	14699165
CompTox Dashboard (EPA)	DTXSID701336544
- InChI: InChI=1S/C4H8Cl2Se/c5-1-3-7-4-2-6/h1-4H2 Key: FFMUKNDYULFLJK-UHFFFAOYSA-N
- SMILES: C(C[Se]CCCl)Cl

Properties
Chemical formula	C_{4}H_{8}Cl_{2}Se
Molar mass	205.98 g·mol^{−1}
Appearance	low-melting colorless solid
Melting point	24 °C (75 °F; 297 K)
- Except where otherwise noted, data are given for materials in their standard state (at 25 °C [77 °F], 100 kPa). Infobox references

Bis(2-chloroethyl)selenide is the organoselenium compound with the formula Se(CH_{2}CH_{2}Cl)_{2}. As a haloalkyl derivative of selenium, it is an analogue of bis(2-chloroethyl)sulfide, the prototypical sulfur mustard used in chemical warfare. Bis(2-chloroethyl)selenide has not been used as a chemical warfare agent, however it is still a potent alkylating agent and has potential in chemotherapy.

== See also ==
- Diethyl selenide
- O-Mustard
