= Chloromethyl methyl sulfide =

Names
- Other names methylthiomethyl chloride; MTMCl

Identifiers
CAS Number	2373-51-5
3D model (JSmol)	Interactive image
ChemSpider	16027
EC Number	219-148-4
PubChem CID	16916
- InChI: InChI=1S/C2H5ClS/c1-4-2-3/h2H2,1H3 Key: JWMLCCRPDOIBAV-UHFFFAOYSA-N
- SMILES: CSCCl

Properties
Chemical formula	C_{2}H_{5}ClS
Molar mass	96.57 g·mol^{−1}
Appearance	colorless liquid
Density	1.1773 g cm^{−3}
Boiling point	107 °C (225 °F; 380 K) 750 mmHg

Hazards
- GHS labelling
Pictograms	(GHS02: Flammable) (GHS07: Exclamation mark)
Signal word	Danger
Hazard statements	H225, H315, H319, H335
Precautionary statements	P210, P233, P240, P241, P242, P243, P261, P264, P264+P265, P271, P280, P302+P352, P303+P361+P353, P304+P340, P305+P351+P338, P319, P321, P332+P317, P337+P317, P362+P364, P370+P378, P403+P233, P403+P235, P405, P501

Related compounds
Related compounds	Dimethyl sulfide; 2-Chloroethyl ethyl sulfide
- Except where otherwise noted, data are given for materials in their standard state (at 25 °C [77 °F], 100 kPa). Infobox references

Chloromethyl methyl sulfide is the organosulfur compound with the formula ClCH_{2}SCH_{3}. In terms of functional groups, it is a thioether and an alkyl chloride. The compound is structurally related to sulfur mustards, i.e., it is a potentially hazardous alkylating agent. The compound finds some use in organic chemistry as a protecting group. In the presence of base, it converts carboxylic acids (RCO_{2}H) to esters RCO_{2}CH_{2}SCH_{3}. The compound is prepared by treatment of dimethylsulfide with sulfuryl chloride.
