= Dibenzo-18-crown-6 =

- Skeletal formula

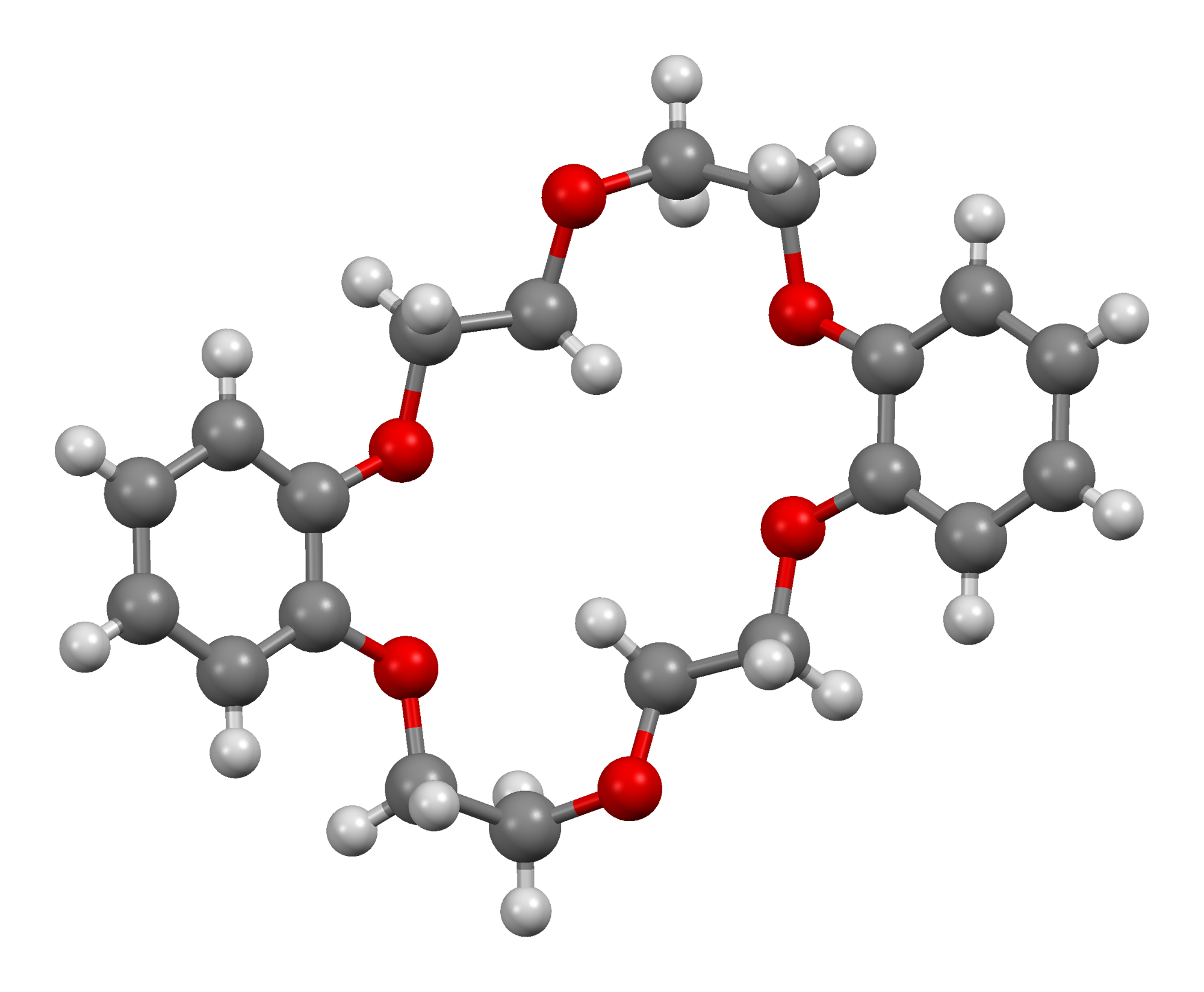
- Ball-and-stick model

Names
- Preferred IUPAC name 6,7,9,10,17,18,20,21-Octahydrodibenzo[b,k][1,4,7,10,13,16]hexaoxacyclooctadecine

Identifiers
CAS Number	14187-32-7
3D model (JSmol)	Interactive image
ChEBI	CHEBI:358732
ChEMBL	ChEMBL345536
ChemSpider	24722
ECHA InfoCard	100.034.568
KEGG	C14289
PubChem CID	26541
UNII	0A7W45JCS9
CompTox Dashboard (EPA)	DTXSID6022428
- InChI: InChI=1S/C20H24O6/c1-2-6-18-17(5-1)23-13-9-21-11-15-25-19-7-3-4-8-20(19)26-16-12-22-10-14-24-18/h1-8H,9-16H2 Key: YSSSPARMOAYJTE-UHFFFAOYSA-N; InChI=1/C20H24O6/c1-2-6-18-17(5-1)23-13-9-21-11-15-25-19-7-3-4-8-20(19)26-16-12-22-10-14-24-18/h1-8H,9-16H2 Key: YSSSPARMOAYJTE-UHFFFAOYAB
- SMILES: O1c3c(OCCOCCOc2ccccc2OCCOCC1)cccc3

Properties
Chemical formula	C_{20}H_{24}O_{6}
Molar mass	360.406 g·mol^{−1}
Appearance	white solid
Melting point	162.5–163.5 °C (324.5–326.3 °F; 435.6–436.6 K)
- Except where otherwise noted, data are given for materials in their standard state (at 25 °C [77 °F], 100 kPa). verify (what is ?) Infobox references

Dibenzo-18-crown-6 is the organic compound with the formula [OC_{6}H_{4}OCH_{2}CH_{2}OCH_{2}CH_{2}]_{2}. It is a white solid that is soluble in organic solvents. As one of the most popular crown ethers, it facilitates the dissolution of many salts in organic solvents. It is related to the non-benzannulated 18-crown-6.

Dibenzo-18-crown-6 can be synthesized from catechol and bis(chloroethyl) ether.

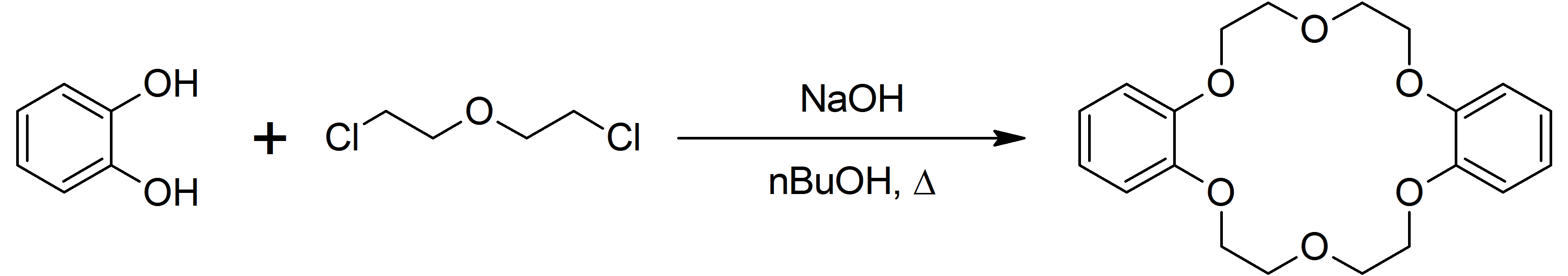

In contrast to those of 18-crown-6, complexes of the dibenzo crown are flattened, which often allows higher coordination numbers at the encapsulated metal cation.

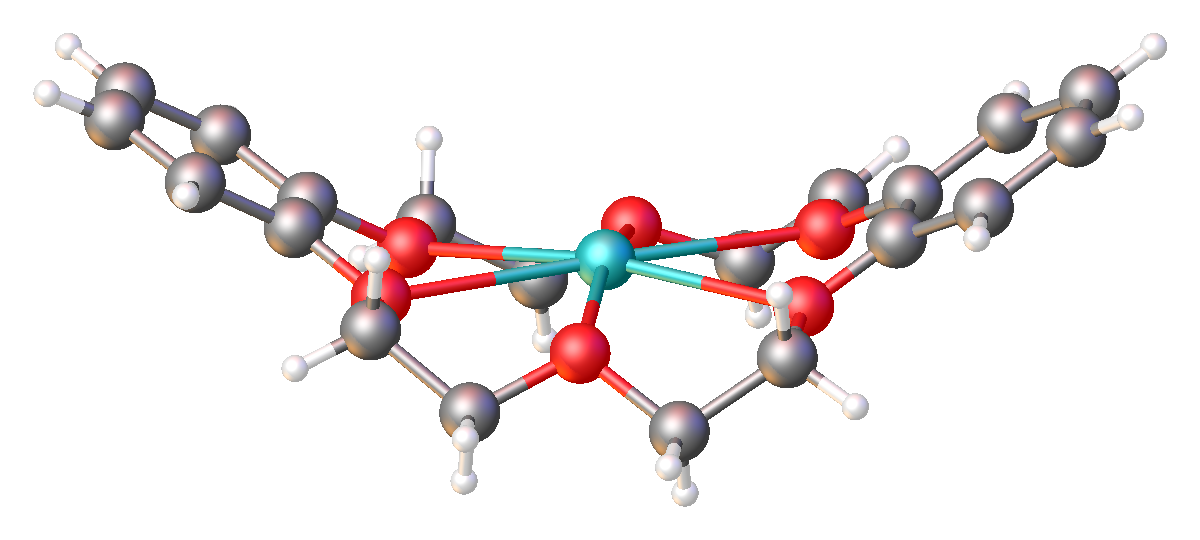
Structure of [Na(dibenzo-18-c-6)]^{+}, as found in the FeCl_{4}^{−} salt.
