= O-mustard =

Names
- Preferred IUPAC name 1-Chloro-2-[(2-{2-[(2-chloroethyl)sulfanyl]ethoxy}ethyl)sulfanyl]ethane
- Other names Bis[2-(2-chloroethylsulfanyl)ethyl] ether

Identifiers
CAS Number	63918-89-8
3D model (JSmol)	Interactive image
ChemSpider	41353
PubChem CID	45452
UNII	BG8SN2S6WA
CompTox Dashboard (EPA)	DTXSID7074799
- InChI: InChI=1S/C8H16Cl2OS2/c9-1-5-12-7-3-11-4-8-13-6-2-10/h1-8H2 Key: FWVCSXWHVOOTFJ-UHFFFAOYSA-N
- SMILES: C(CSCCCl)OCCSCCCl

Properties
Chemical formula	C_{8}H_{16}Cl_{2}OS_{2}
Molar mass	263.24 g·mol^{−1}
- Except where otherwise noted, data are given for materials in their standard state (at 25 °C [77 °F], 100 kPa). Infobox references

O-mustard (T) is a vesicant chemical weapon, a type of mustard gas, with around three times the toxicity of the original sulfur mustard. It was developed in England in the 1930s as a thickener for mustard gas to make it more persistent when used in warm climates. A mixture of 60% sulfur mustard and 40% O-mustard also has a lower freezing point than pure sulfur mustard, and was given the code name HT. O-mustard is a Schedule I substance under the Chemical Weapons Convention.

== See also ==
- Bis(chloromethyl) ether
- HN3 (nitrogen mustard)
- Lewisite
- Selenium mustard
- Sesquimustard
