= Thiodiglycol =

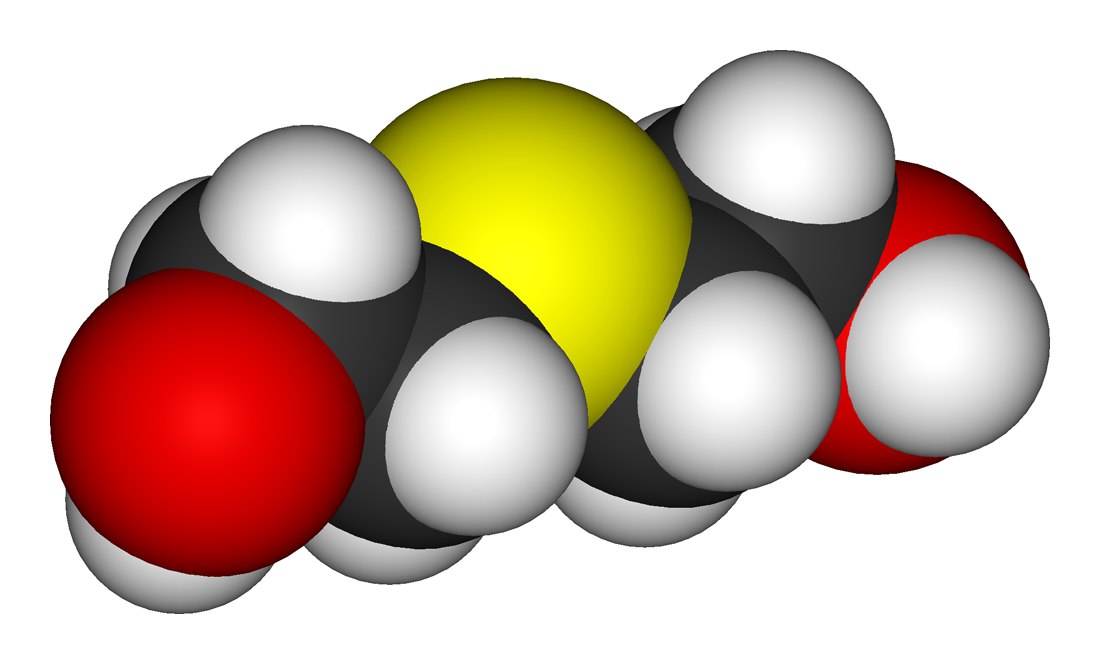

Names
- IUPAC name 2-(2-Hydroxyethylsulfanyl)ethanol
- Other names 2,2'-Thiodiethanol β,β'-dihydroxydiethyl sulfide β-thiodiglycol thiodiethylene glycol β-hydroxyethyl sulfide 2-hydroxyethyl sulfide bis(2-hydroxyethyl) sulfide bis(β-hydroxyethyl) sulfide Glyecine A Kromfax Solvent; Tedegyl

Identifiers
| CAS Number | 111-48-8 |
| 3D model (JSmol) | Interactive image |
| ChEBI | CHEBI:75184 |
| ChEMBL | ChEMBL444480 |
| ChemSpider | 13881956 |
| ECHA InfoCard | 100.003.523 |
| PubChem CID | 5447 |
| UNII | 9BW5T43J04 |
| CompTox Dashboard (EPA) | DTXSID6026878 |
- InChI: InChI=1S/C4H10O2S/c5-1-3-7-4-2-6/h5-6H,1-4H2 Key: YODZTKMDCQEPHD-UHFFFAOYSA-N; InChI=1/C4H10O2S/c5-1-3-7-4-2-6/h5-6H,1-4H2 Key: YODZTKMDCQEPHD-UHFFFAOYAC
- SMILES: OCCSCCO

Properties
| Chemical formula | C_{4}H_{10}O_{2}S |
| Molar mass | 122.18 g·mol^{−1} |
| Appearance | colorless liquid |
| Melting point | −16 °C (3 °F; 257 K) |
| Boiling point | 165 °C (329 °F; 438 K) at 14 mmHg (1.9 kPa) or decomposition at 282 °C at normal pressure |
- Except where otherwise noted, data are given for materials in their standard state (at 25 °C [77 °F], 100 kPa). verify (what is ?) Infobox references

Thiodiglycol, or bis(2-hydroxyethyl)sulfide (also known as 2,2-thiodiethanol or TDE), is the organosulfur compound with the formula S(CH_{2}CH_{2}OH)_{2}. It is miscible with water and polar organic solvents. It is a colorless liquid. It is structurally similar to diethylene glycol.

Thiodiglycol is manufactured by reaction of 2-chloroethanol with sodium sulfide.

Thiodiglycol is a polar protic solvent. It is used as a solvent in a variety of applications ranging from dyeing textiles to inks in some ballpoint pens. In chemical synthesis, it is used as a building block for protection products, dispersants, fibers, plasticizers, rubber accelerators, pesticides, dyes, and various other organic chemicals. In the manufacture of polymers, it is used as a chain transfer agent. As an antioxidant, it is used as an additive in lubricants.

Thiodiglycol is used as a mounting medium in microscopy. The ability to vary the refractive index of the medium by varying the concentration of TDE in an aqueous solution, plus its relative lack of toxicity makes it highly desirable for such use. The refractive index of the solution can be varied anywhere from near that of water (1.333) to that of glass (1.518).

Thiodiglycol is a Chemical Weapons Convention schedule 2 chemical used in the production of sulfur-based mustard gases. Thiodiglycol is also a product of the hydrolysis of the "mustard gas" bis(2-chloroethyl)sulfide and can be detected in the urine of casualties. It was used extensively in the manufacturing of the weapons involved in the Anfal campaign. Dutch war criminal Frans van Anraat was found to be guilty of supplying Thiodiglycol to Ba'athist Iraq.
