= 2-Bromoethyl ether =

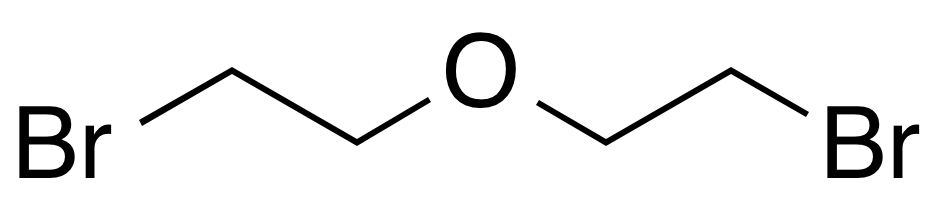

Names
- Preferred IUPAC name 2-Bromo-1-(2-bromoethoxy)ethane
- Other names Bromex

Identifiers
CAS Number	5414-19-7
3D model (JSmol)	Interactive image
ChemSpider	20226
ECHA InfoCard	100.024.095
EC Number	226-504-2
PubChem CID	21521
UNII	XTS6KN2SLA
CompTox Dashboard (EPA)	DTXSID1063851
- InChI: InChI=1S/C4H8Br2O/c5-1-3-7-4-2-6/h1-4H2 Key: FOZVXADQAHVUSV-UHFFFAOYSA-N
- SMILES: C(CBr)OCCBr

Properties
Density	1.845
Refractive index (n_{D})	1.5140

Hazards
- GHS labelling
Pictograms	(GHS05: Corrosive) (GHS07: Exclamation mark)
Signal word	Danger
Hazard statements	H315, H318, H335
Precautionary statements	P261, P264, P271, P280, P302+P352, P304+P340, P305+P351+P338, P310, P312, P321, P332+P313, P362, P403+P233, P405, P501

Related compounds
Related compounds	Bis(chloroethyl) ether
- Except where otherwise noted, data are given for materials in their standard state (at 25 °C [77 °F], 100 kPa). Infobox references

2-Bromoethyl ether (or Bis(2-bromoethyl) ether) is an organobromine compound that is also an ether. It is used in the manufacture of pharmaceuticals and crown ethers.
