= Winford Lee Lewis =

American chemist (1878–1943)

- Born: May 29, 1878; Gridley, California, U.S.
- Died: January 20, 1943 (aged 64); Evanston, Illinois, U.S.
- Known for: Rediscovery of lewisite
- Scientific career
- Fields: Chemistry

Winford Lee Lewis (May 29, 1878 – January 20, 1943) was a US soldier and chemist best known for his rediscovery of the chemical warfare agent lewisite in 1917. He was born in Gridley, California and died in his home in Evanston, Illinois in 1943 following a fall.

== Biography ==
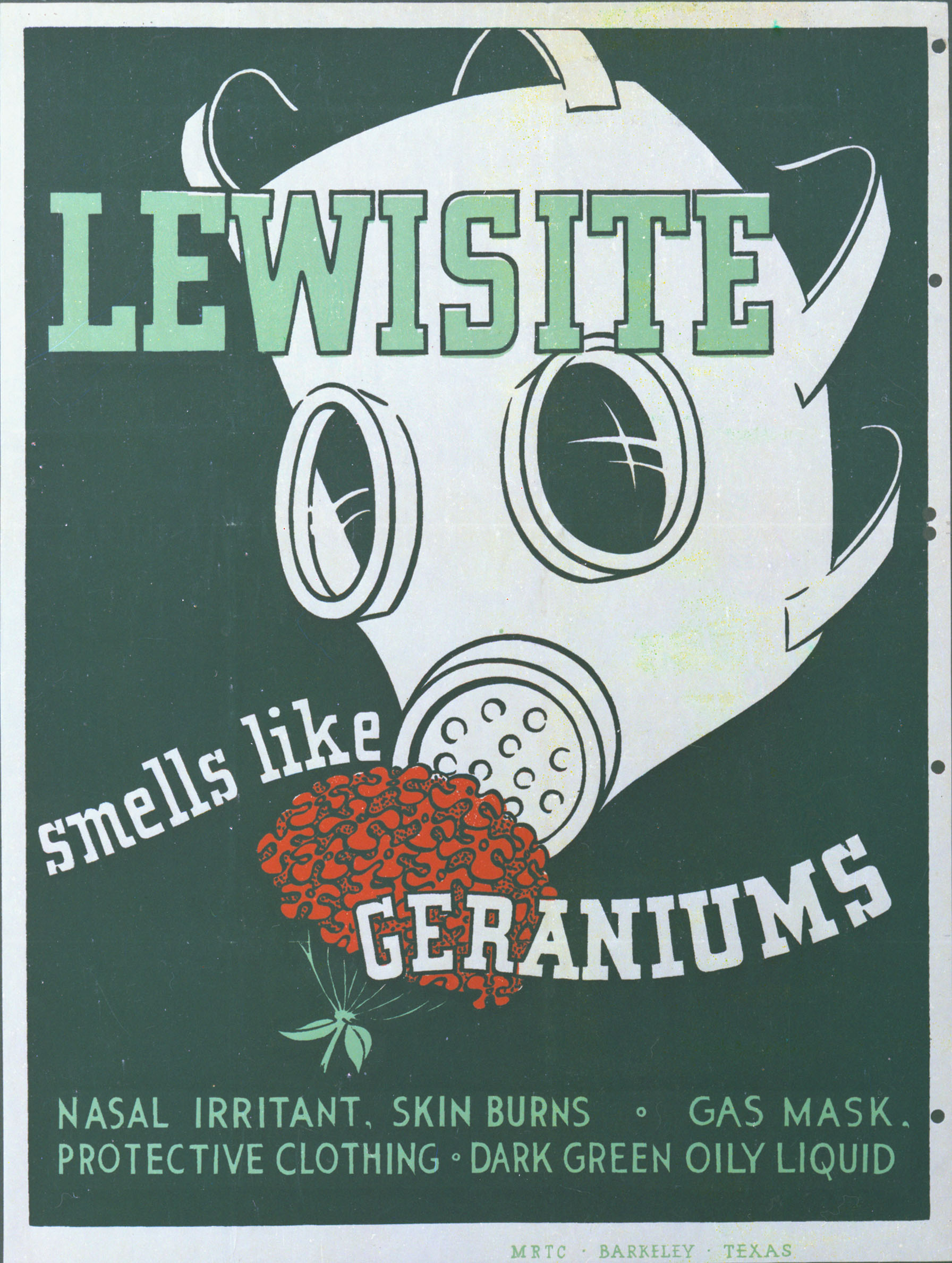
Lewisite educational poster produced during World War II

Winford Lee Lewis was born at home to George M Lewis and Sarah A Lewis on May 29, 1878, in Gridley, California. He was the youngest of seven children: he had six brothers and one sister. In 1908 he and his wife Myrlilla C Lewis had a daughter Miriam Lewis. He attended Stanford University and graduated in 1902. In 1909, he graduated with a degree in chemistry from the University of Chicago. He became a chemistry professor at Northwestern University until the outbreak of World War I. During the war, he served in the United States Chemical Warfare Service. It was during his service with the Chemical Warfare Service that he rediscovered Lewisite and assisted in its weaponization and mass production. After the war, Lewis gave several high profile speeches in the defense of the Chemical Warfare Service and the use of chemical weapons in warfare.

== Publications ==
- On the action of Fehling's solution on malt sugar (1909)
- Prices of drugs and pharmaceuticals (1919)
- Meat through the microscope: applications of chemistry and the biological sciences to some problems of the meat packing industry (1940)

== Patents ==
- US patent 2147261, "Producing stable color in meats", published 1939-02-14

== See also ==
- United States chemical weapons program
