= Bis(chloroethyl) ether =

Names
- Preferred IUPAC name 1-Chloro-2-(2-chloroethoxy)ethane
- Other names: Oxygen mustard; Bis(2-chloroethyl) ether; 2,2'-Dichlorodiethyl ether; Chlorex; Khloreks; DCEE; 2-Chloroethyl ether; 1,1'-oxybis[2-chloroethane]

Identifiers
CAS Number	111-44-4
3D model (JSmol)	Interactive image
ChEBI	CHEBI:34573
ChEMBL	ChEMBL1613350
ChemSpider	21106016
ECHA InfoCard	100.003.519
EC Number	203-870-1
KEGG	C14688
PubChem CID	8115
RTECS number	KN0875000
UNII	6K7D1G5M5N
UN number	1916
CompTox Dashboard (EPA)	DTXSID9020168
- InChI: InChI=1S/C4H8Cl2O/c5-1-3-7-4-2-6/h1-4H2 Key: ZNSMNVMLTJELDZ-UHFFFAOYSA-N; InChI=1/C4H8Cl2O/c5-1-3-7-4-2-6/h1-4H2 Key: ZNSMNVMLTJELDZ-UHFFFAOYAN
- SMILES: ClCCOCCCl

Properties
Chemical formula	C_{4}H_{8}Cl_{2}O
Molar mass	143.01 g·mol^{−1}
Appearance	Clear liquid
Odor	Chlorinated solvent-like
Density	1.22 g/mL
Melting point	−50 °C; −58 °F; 223 K
Boiling point	178 °C; 352 °F; 451 K decomposes
Solubility in water	10,200 mg/L
Vapor pressure	0.7 mmHg (20 °C)

Hazards
- Occupational safety and health (OHS/OSH)
Main hazards	Very toxic (T+); Dangerous for the environment (N); Vesicant; Likely Carcinogen
- GHS labelling
Pictograms	(GHS02: Flammable) (GHS06: Toxic) (GHS07: Exclamation mark) (GHS08: Health hazard)
Signal word	Danger
Hazard statements	H226, H300, H310, H315, H319, H330, H351
Precautionary statements	P201, P202, P210, P233, P240, P241, P242, P243, P260, P262, P264, P270, P271, P280, P281, P284, P301+P310, P302+P350, P302+P352, P303+P361+P353, P304+P340, P305+P351+P338, P308+P313, P310, P320, P321, P330, P332+P313, P337+P313, P361, P362, P363, P370+P378, P403+P233, P403+P235, P405, P501
NFPA 704 (fire diamond)	4 1 1
Flash point	55 °C; 131 °F; 328 K
Explosive limits	2.7%-?
- Lethal dose or concentration (LD, LC)
LC_{50} (median concentration)	77 ppm (rat, 4 hr); 152 ppm (mouse, 2 hr); 500 ppm (guinea pig, 1 hr)
LC_{Lo} (lowest published)	250 ppm (rat, 4 hr); 500 ppm (guinea pig, 5 hr)
- NIOSH (US health exposure limits)
PEL (Permissible)	TWA 15 ppm (90 mg/m^{3}) [skin]
REL (Recommended)	Ca TWA 5 ppm (30 mg/m^{3}) ST 10 ppm (60 mg/m^{3}) [skin]
IDLH (Immediate danger)	Ca [100 ppm]

Related compounds
Related compounds	Sulfur mustard Nitrogen mustard 2-Bromoethyl ether
- Except where otherwise noted, data are given for materials in their standard state (at 25 °C [77 °F], 100 kPa). (what is ?) Infobox references

Bis(chloroethyl) ether is an organic compound with the formula O(CH_{2}CH_{2}Cl)_{2}. It is an ether with two 2-chloroethyl substituents. It is a colorless liquid with the odor of a chlorinated solvent.

== Reactions and applications ==
Bis(chloroethyl) ether is less reactive than the corresponding sulfur mustard S(CH_{2}CH_{2}Cl)_{2}. In the presence of base, it reacts with catechol to form dibenzo-18-crown-6:

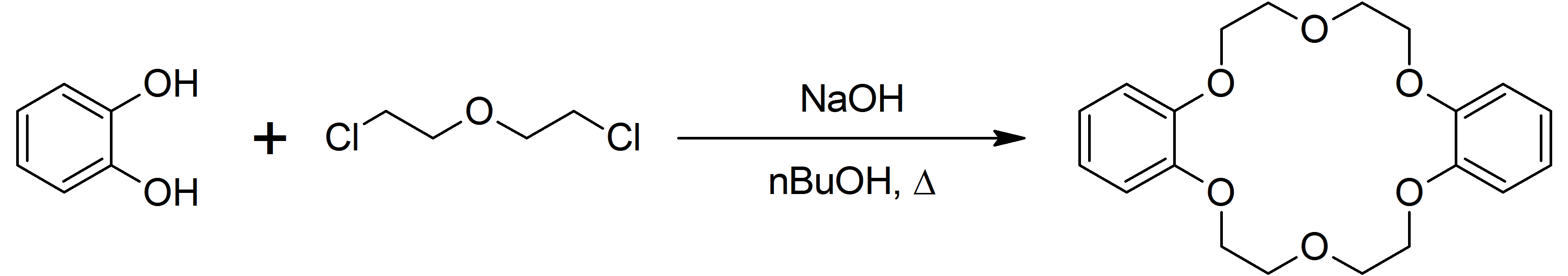

Bis(chloroethyl) ether can be used in the synthesis of the cough suppressant fedrilate. It is combined with benzyl cyanide and two molar equivalents of sodamide in a ring-forming reaction. When treated with strong base, it gives divinyl ether, an anesthetic:

O(CH_{2}CH_{2}Cl)_{2} + 2 KOH → O(CH=CH_{2})_{2} + 2 KCl + 2 H_{2}O

== Toxicity ==
The LD_{50} is 74 mg/kg (oral, rat). Bis(chloroethyl) ether is considered as a potential carcinogen.

== See also ==
- Bis(chloromethyl) ether
- Sulfur mustard
