= Allyl methyl sulfide =

Organosulfur compound

- XYZ

Names
- Preferred IUPAC name 3-(Methylsulfanyl)prop-1-ene
- Other names Methyl propenyl sulfide 3-Methylthio-1-propene

Identifiers
CAS Number	10152-76-8
3D model (JSmol)	Interactive image
ChemSpider	21159856
ECHA InfoCard	100.030.371
EC Number	233-422-0
MeSH	allyl+methyl+sulfide
PubChem CID	66282
RTECS number	UD1015000
UNII	V7QI1R316C
UN number	1993
CompTox Dashboard (EPA)	DTXSID9064976
- InChI: InChI=1S/C4H8S/c1-3-4-5-2/h3H,1,4H2,2H3 Key: NVLPQIPTCCLBEU-UHFFFAOYSA-N; InChI=1/C4H8S/c1-3-4-5-2/h3H,1,4H2,2H3 Key: NVLPQIPTCCLBEU-UHFFFAOYAX
- SMILES: CSCC=C

Properties
Chemical formula	C_{4}H_{8}S
Molar mass	88.17 g·mol^{−1}
Odor	Garlic
Density	0.803 g cm^{−3}
Boiling point	92 °C; 197 °F; 365 K

Hazards
- GHS labelling
Pictograms	(GHS02: Flammable)
Signal word	Danger
Hazard statements	H225
Precautionary statements	P210
Flash point	18.0 °C (64.4 °F; 291.1 K)
- Except where otherwise noted, data are given for materials in their standard state (at 25 °C [77 °F], 100 kPa). verify (what is ?) Infobox references

Allyl methyl sulfide is an organosulfur compound with the chemical formula CH_{2}=CHCH_{2}SCH_{3}. The molecule features two functional groups, an allyl (CH_{2}=CHCH_{2}) and a sulfide. It is a colourless liquid with a strong odor characteristic of alkyl sulfides. It is a metabolite of garlic, and "garlic breath" and/or "garlic body odor" is attributed to its presence. Consumption of polyphenol-containing foods has been shown to suppress the release of allyl methyl sulfide from the body.

It is prepared by the reaction of allyl chloride with sodium hydroxide and methanethiol.

CH_{2}=CHCH_{2}Cl + NaOH (aq) + CH_{3}SH → CH_{2}=CHCH_{2}SCH_{3} + NaCl + H_{2}O
