= Chronic Respiratory Disease =

- Discipline: Respiratory disease
- Language: English
- Edited by: Mike Morgan, Carolyn Rochester, Sally Singh

Publication details
- History: 2004-present
- Publisher: SAGE Publications
- Frequency: Quarterly

Standard abbreviations
- ISO 4: Chronic Respir. Dis.
- NLM: Chron Respir Dis

Indexing
- ISSN: 1479-9723 (print); 1479-9731 (web)
- LCCN: 2004243524
- OCLC no.: 645354046

Links
- Journal homepage; Online access; Online archive

Chronic Respiratory Disease is a quarterly peer-reviewed medical journal that covers research in the field of respiratory disease, including chronic obstructive pulmonary disease, respiratory failure, and obstructive sleep apnea. The editors-in-chief are Mike Morgan (Glenfield Hospital), Carolyn Rochester (Yale University), and Sally Singh (Glenfield Hospital). It was established in 2004 and is published by SAGE Publications.

== Abstracting and indexing ==
The journal is abstracted and indexed in:

- EMBASE
- MEDLINE
- Scopus
- Zetoc
