= 2-Chloroethyl ethyl sulfide =

Names
- Preferred IUPAC name 1-Chloro-2-(ethylsulfanyl)ethane
- Other names 1-Chloro-2-(ethylthio)ethane, 2-(Ethylthio)chloroethane 2-Chlorodiethyl sulfide

Identifiers
CAS Number	693-07-2
3D model (JSmol)	Interactive image
ChEMBL	ChEMBL3183525
ChemSpider	12210
ECHA InfoCard	100.010.676
EC Number	211-742-1
PubChem CID	12733
UNII	5MN267Q6RG
CompTox Dashboard (EPA)	DTXSID3027295
- InChI: InChI=1S/C4H9ClS/c1-2-6-4-3-5/h2-4H2,1H3 Key: GBNVXYXIRHSYEG-UHFFFAOYSA-N
- SMILES: CCSCCCl

Properties
Chemical formula	C_{4}H_{9}ClS
Molar mass	124.63 g·mol^{−1}
Appearance	Colorless liquid
Density	1.0663 g/cm^{3}
Boiling point	156 °C (313 °F; 429 K)

Hazards
- GHS labelling
Pictograms	(GHS02: Flammable) (GHS05: Corrosive) (GHS06: Toxic) (GHS07: Exclamation mark) (GHS08: Health hazard)
Signal word	Danger
Hazard statements	H226, H301, H302, H311, H314, H331, H350
Precautionary statements	P201, P202, P210, P233, P240, P241, P242, P243, P260, P264, P270, P271, P280, P281, P301+P310, P301+P312, P301+P330+P331, P302+P352, P303+P361+P353, P304+P340, P305+P351+P338, P308+P313, P310, P311, P312, P321, P322, P330, P361, P363, P370+P378, P403+P233, P403+P235, P405, P501
- Except where otherwise noted, data are given for materials in their standard state (at 25 °C [77 °F], 100 kPa). Infobox references

2-Chloroethyl ethyl sulfide is the organosulfur compound with the formula C_{2}H_{5}SC_{2}H_{4}Cl. It is a colorless liquid. The compound is part of the family of vesicant compounds known as half mustards, has been heavily investigated because of its structural similarity to the sulfur mustard S(C_{2}H_{4}Cl)_{2}. The LD_{50} of the half mustard is 252 mg/kg (oral, rats) compared to 2.4 mg/kg for the full mustard.
