= Garlic breath =

Bad breath induced by the consumption of garlic

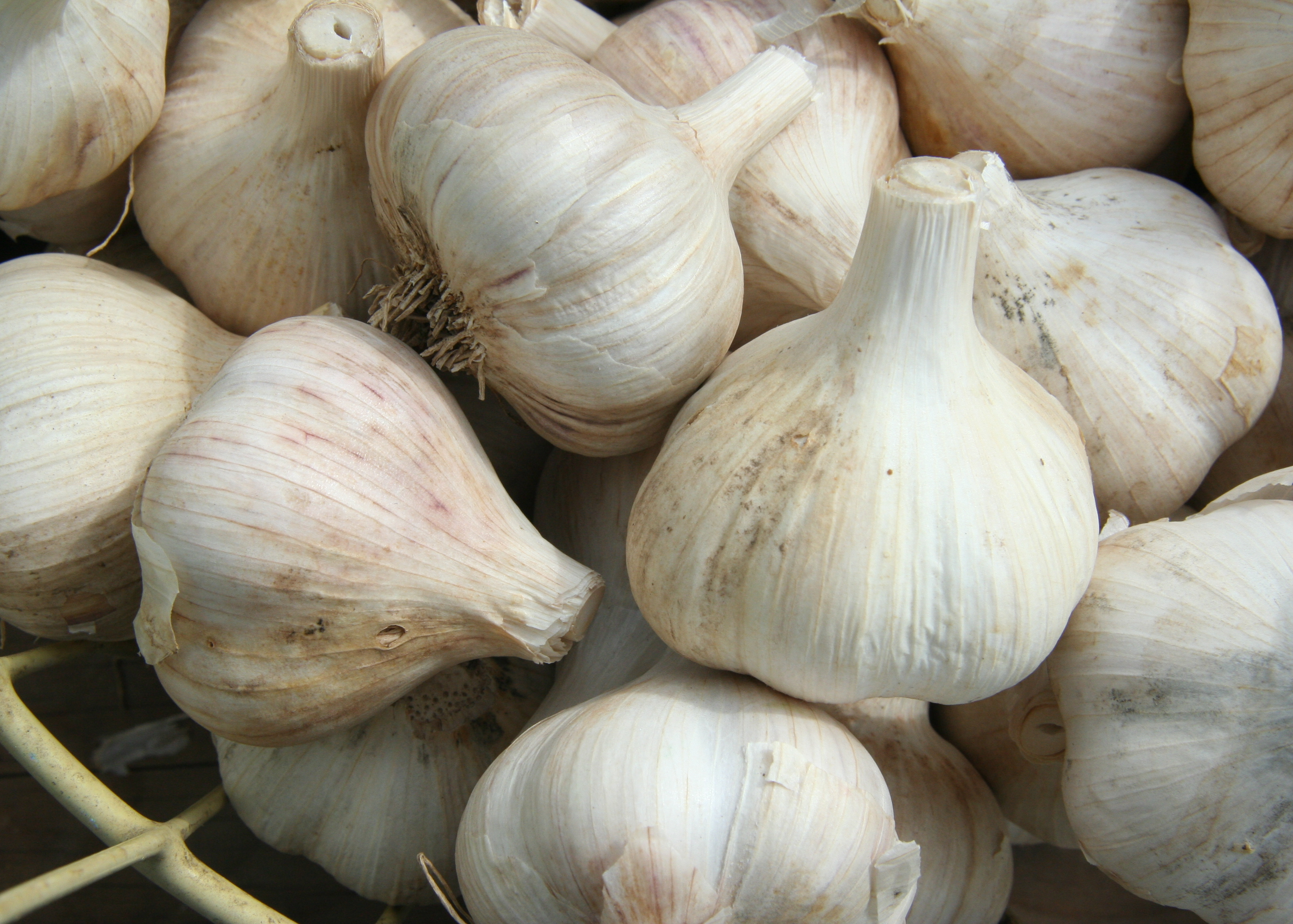
Garlic

Garlic breath is halitosis (bad breath) resulting from the consumption of garlic.

== Causes ==
The major volatile compounds responsible for garlic breath are allyl methyl sulfide, allyl methyl disulfide, allyl mercaptan, diallyl disulfide, dimethyl disulfide and methyl mercaptan, along with minor amounts of dimethyl selenide. Various other sulfur compounds are also produced when allicin in garlic is broken down in the stomach and liver. Out of the many compounds, allyl methyl sulfide (AMS) does not break down quickly and remains in the body in significant amounts hours after consumption, resulting in an odor that can last for hours — or even for as long as two days. AMS is the only one of the garlic-derived organosulfur compounds detectable in the lungs or urine, as well as the mouth, which means that AMS is reabsorbed into the blood stream and travels to other organs for excretion - namely the lungs, kidneys and skin. Anaerobic bacteria, which do not metabolize oxygen, are a main source for producing volatile sulfur compounds (VSC) which cause bad breath.

== Remedies ==
Mouthwash or breath mints are not particularly effective, since the sulfurous compounds are absorbed into the bloodstream, and exit the body through the lungs and skin. Consuming parsley is a common folk remedy. Studies conducted at Ohio State University have shown that drinking milk can reduce garlic breath. Lettuce, chicory, celery, potato, parsley, mint leaves, peppermint, and basil were shown to be the best remedy according to the study. Eating these foods raw is more effective than heated. Indeed, enzymes that degrade the sulfurous compounds responsible for garlic breath are heat sensitive and found in previously mentioned food.
