= Arsenical =

Chemical compound containing arsenic

Arsenicals are chemical compounds that contain arsenic. In a military context, the term arsenical refers to toxic arsenic compounds that are used as chemical warfare agents. This includes blister agents, blood agents and vomiting agents. Historically, they were used extensively as insecticides, especially lead arsenate.

== Examples ==
=== Blister agents ===
- Ethyldichloroarsine
- Lewisite
- Methyldichloroarsine
- Phenyldichloroarsine

=== Blood agents ===
- Arsine

=== Vomiting agents ===
- Adamsite
- Diphenylchlorarsine
- Diphenylcyanoarsine
- Phenyldichloroarsine
