= V series =

V series or V-series may refer to:

== Science and technology ==
- List of ITU-T V-series recommendations, on data communication over the telephone network
- LG V series, a line of high-end Android devices
- V series of Sony Ericsson phones, exclusive to Vodafone
- V-series, of nerve agents:
  - VE (nerve agent)
  - VG (nerve agent)
  - VM (nerve agent)
  - VR (nerve agent)
  - VS (nerve agent)
  - VX (nerve agent)

== Other uses ==
- Cadillac V series, a line of high-performance vehicles
- V (TV series), several TV series
- V Series (Swedish TV channel), a TV channel

== See also ==
- V (disambiguation)
