= Chōsen Coal Industry Company =

Japanese company in colonial Korea

Chōsen Coal Industry Company, Ltd.
- Native name: 조선석탄공업주식회사 朝鮮石炭工業株式會社
- Romanized name: Korean: Joseon Seoktaneop Jusikhoesa; Japanese: Chōsen Sekitan Kōgyō Kabushiki Kaisha
- Formerly: Chōsen Synthetic Oil Company 조선합성유주식회사 朝鮮合成油株式会社
- Type: Kabushiki kaisha
- Industry: Mining, Railway
- Defunct: 1945
- Fate: Nationalised
- Headquarters: Haksong-ri, Korea, Empire of Japan

Ao Line

Overview
- Other name: Obong Line (오봉선 (梧鳳線))
- Native name: 아오선 (Korean: Ao-seon) 阿梧線 (Japanese: Ao-sen)
- Owner: Chosen Coal Industry Company
- Locale: North Hamgyŏng
- Termini: Aoji; Obong
- Stations: 4

Service
- Type: Heavy rail, Regional rail
- Operator: Chosen Coal Industry Railway

History
- Opened: 9 September 1938 (Aoji−Hoeam); 14 September 1942 (Hoeam−Obong)

Technical
- Line length: 10.4 km (6.5 mi)
- Number of tracks: Single track
- Track gauge: 1,435 mm (4 ft 8 1/2 in) standard gauge

The Chōsen Coal Industry Company (Japanese: 朝鮮石炭工業株式會社 Chōsen Sekitan Kōgyō Kabushiki Kaisha; Korean: 조선석탄공업주식회사; RR: Joseon Seoktaneop Jusikhoesa) was a kabushiki kaisha in colonial Korea that operated collieries in Aoji, Sinaoji and Obong in Gyeongheung County, North Hamgyeong Province. In addition to the mines, after the Chōsen Synthetic Oil Company opened a large factory in Aoji-ri (now Haksong-ri) in 1937 to produce synthetic oil from the bituminous coal mined in the area, the Chosen Coal Industry Company built a railway line, called the Ao Line, to connect its mines to the chemical factory and to the South Manchuria Railway's North Chōsen East Line, opening the line in two parts in 1938 and 1942.

Following the partition of Korea and the establishment of North Korea, the company was nationalised. The Ao Line, along with all other railway lines in the country, was nationalised on 10 August 1946, becoming part of the Korean State Railway.
