= Selenophos =

Names
- Preferred IUPAC name Se-[2-(Diethylamino)ethyl] O-ethyl ethylphosphonoselenoate
- Other names Seleno-VE

Identifiers
CAS Number	10161-84-9
3D model (JSmol)	Interactive image
ChemSpider	175244
PubChem CID	202353
UNII	YLM7NE49F5
CompTox Dashboard (EPA)	DTXSID00906396
- InChI: InChI=1S/C10H24NO2PSe/c1-5-11(6-2)9-10-15-14(12,8-4)13-7-3/h5-10H2,1-4H3 Key: QNGZOSUHNXJPIY-UHFFFAOYSA-N
- SMILES: CCN(CC)CC[Se]P(=O)(CC)OCC

Properties
Chemical formula	C_{10}H_{24}NO_{2}PSe
Molar mass	300.252 g·mol^{−1}

Hazards
- Lethal dose or concentration (LD, LC)
LD_{50} (median dose)	21 μg/kg (mouse, subcutaneous)
- Except where otherwise noted, data are given for materials in their standard state (at 25 °C [77 °F], 100 kPa). Infobox references

Selenophos is an extremely potent organophosphate acetylcholinesterase inhibitor. It is the selenium analog of the VE nerve agent.

== See also ==
- VE (nerve agent)
- Ethylphosphonoselenoic dichloride
