= Gyeongheung Eo clan =

Korean clan from North Hamgyong Province

- Country: Korea
- Current region: Kyonghung County
- Founder: Eo Gye bok

Gyeongheung Eo clan (Korean: 경흥 어씨; Hanja: 慶興 魚氏) was one of the Korean clans. Their Bon-gwan was located in Kyonghung County, North Hamgyong Province. According to research in 2000, the number people within the Gyeongheung Eo clan was 542. Their founder was Eo Gye bok. He was a grandchild of Eo Seok gyu (Hanja: 魚石奎) and served as the Menxia Shilang (Hanja: 門下侍郎) in Ming dynasty. He immigrated to Kyonghung and began the Gyeongheung Eo clan.

== See also ==
- Korean clan names of foreign origin
