= Ethylphosphonoselenoic dichloride =

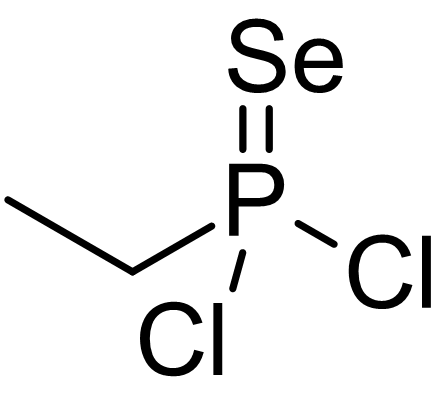

Names
- IUPAC name dichloro-ethyl-selanylidene-λ^{5}-phosphane

Identifiers
CAS Number	14705-46-5
3D model (JSmol)	Interactive image
ChemSpider	452726
PubChem CID	518992
- InChI: InChI=1S/C2H5Cl2PSe/c1-2-5(3,4)6/h2H2,1H3 Key: LDGUNOCOVLVHRU-UHFFFAOYSA-N
- SMILES: CCP(=[Se])(Cl)Cl

Properties
Chemical formula	C_{2}H_{5}Cl_{2}PSe
Molar mass	209.91 g·mol^{−1}
- Except where otherwise noted, data are given for materials in their standard state (at 25 °C [77 °F], 100 kPa). Infobox references

Ethylphosphonoselenoic dichloride is a selenium-containing organophosphorus compound. It's the precursor to selenophos, the selenium analog of the VE nerve agent.

== See also ==
- Methylphosphonyl dichloride
