= Biological agent =

Pathogen that can be weaponized

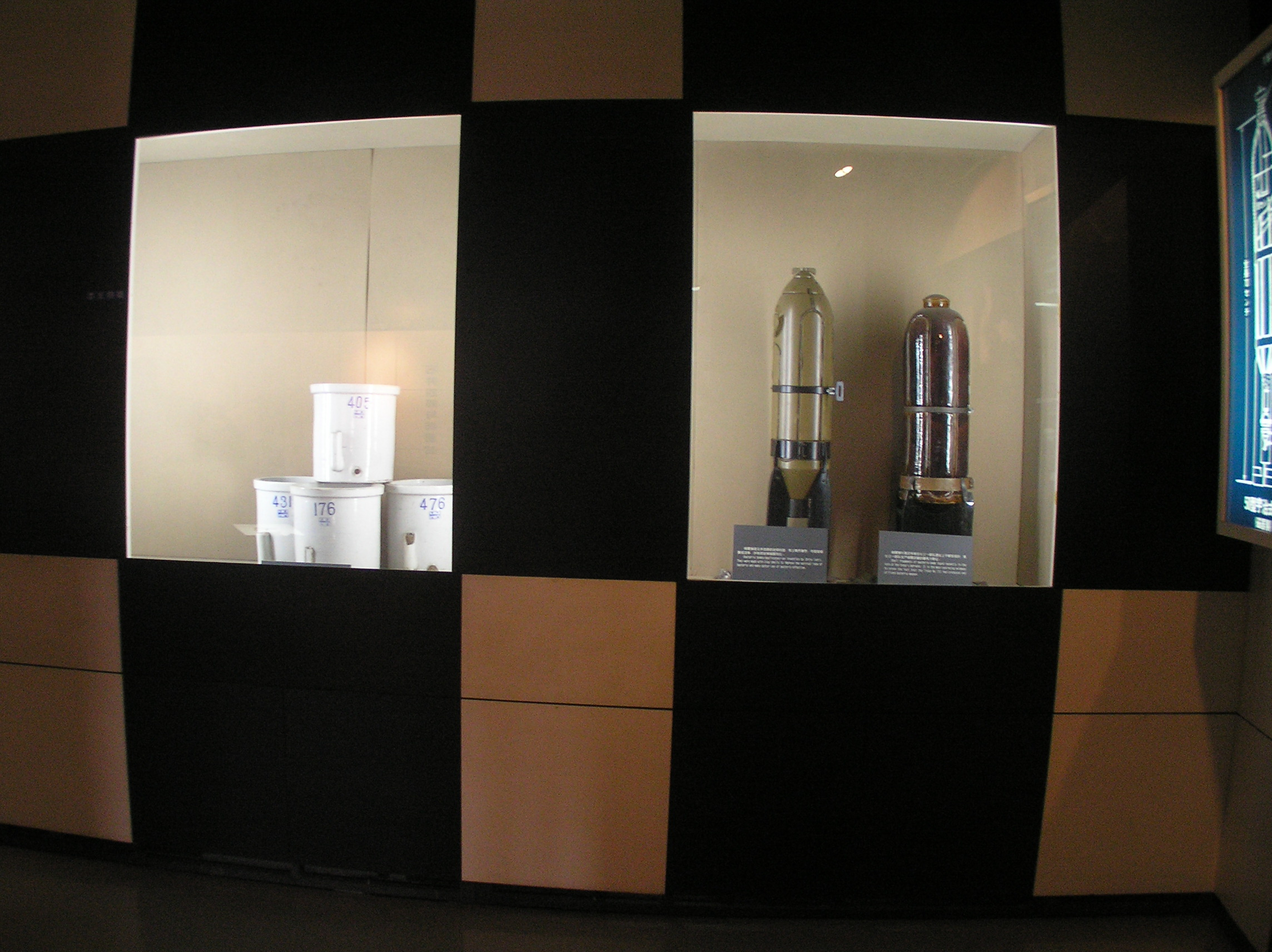
A bacteriological weapon that was in use by the Japanese Army's Unit 731 in China .

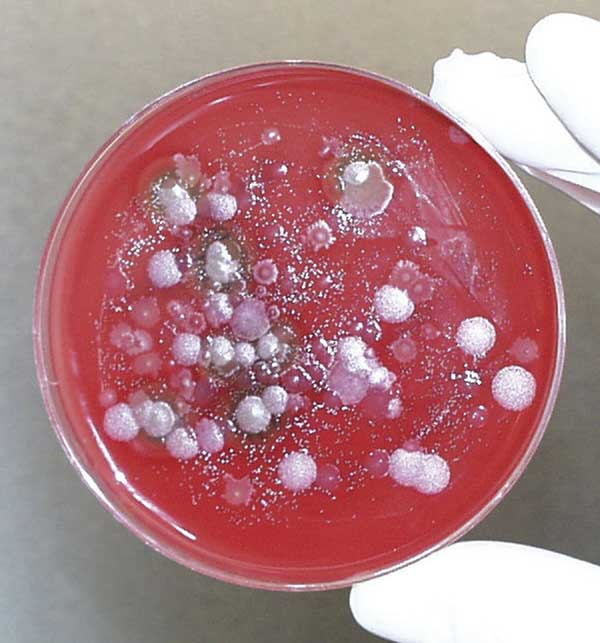
A culture of Bacillus anthracis, the causative agent of anthrax

Biological agents, also known as biological weapons or bioweapons, are pathogens used as weapons. In addition to these living or replicating pathogens, toxins and biotoxins are also included among the bio-agents. More than 1,200 different kinds of potentially weaponizable bio-agents have been described and studied to date, and experts expect that in the future it will be possible to design novel biological weapons.

Some biological agents have the ability to adversely affect human health in a variety of ways, ranging from relatively mild allergic reactions to serious medical conditions, including serious injury, as well as serious or permanent disability or death. Many of these organisms are ubiquitous in the natural environment where they are found in water, soil, plants, or animals. Bio-agents may be amenable to "weaponization" to render them easier to deploy or disseminate. Genetic modification may enhance their incapacitating or lethal properties, or render them impervious to conventional treatments or preventives. Since many bio-agents reproduce rapidly and require minimal resources for propagation, they are also a potential danger in a wide variety of occupational settings.

The 1972 Biological Weapons Convention is an international treaty banning the development, use or stockpiling of biological weapons; as of March 2021, there were 183 states parties to the treaty. Bio-agents are, however, widely studied for both defensive and medical research purposes under various biosafety levels and within biocontainment facilities throughout the world.

== Classifications ==
=== Operational ===
The former United States biological weapons program (1943–1969) categorized its weaponized anti-personnel bio-agents as either "lethal agents" (Bacillus anthracis, Francisella tularensis, Botulinum toxin) or "incapacitating agents" (Brucella suis, Coxiella burnetii, Venezuelan equine encephalitis virus, staphylococcal enterotoxin B).

=== Legal ===
Since 1997, United States law has declared a list of bio-agents designated by the U.S. Department of Health and Human Services or the U.S. Department of Agriculture that have the "potential to pose a severe threat to public health and safety" to be officially defined as "select agents" and possession or transportation of them are tightly controlled as such. Select agents are divided into "HHS select agents and toxins", "USDA select agents and toxins" and "Overlap select agents and toxins".

=== Regulatory ===
The US Centers for Disease Control and Prevention (CDC) breaks biological agents into three categories: Category A, Category B, and Category C. Category A agents pose the greatest threat to the US. Criteria for being a Category "A" agent include high rates of morbidity and mortality, ease of dissemination and communicability, ability to cause a public panic, and special action required by public health officials to respond. Category A agents include anthrax, botulism, plague, smallpox, and viral hemorrhagic fevers.

== List of bio-agents of military importance ==
The following pathogens and toxins were weaponized by one nation or another at some time. NATO abbreviations are included where applicable.

=== Bacterial bio-agents ===
Disease	Causative agent (military symbol)
Anthrax	Bacillus anthracis (N or TR)
Brucellosis (bovine)	Brucella abortus
Brucellosis (caprine)	Brucella melitensis (AM or BX)
Brucellosis (porcine)	Brucella suis (US, AB or NX)
Cholera	Vibrio cholerae (HO)
Diphtheria	Corynebacterium diphtheriae (DK)
Dysentery (bacterial)	Shigella dysenteriae, Escherichia coli (Y)
Glanders	Burkholderia mallei (LA)
Listeriosis	Listeria monocytogenes (TQ)
Melioidosis	Burkholderia pseudomallei (HI)
Plague	Yersinia pestis (LE)
Tularemia	Francisella tularensis (SR or JT)

=== Chlamydial bio-agents ===
Disease	Causative agent (military symbol)
Psittacosis	Chlamydophila psittaci (SI)

=== Rickettsial bio-agents ===
Disease	Causative agent (military symbol)
Q fever	Coxiella burnetii (OU)
Rocky Mountain spotted fever	Rickettsia rickettsii (RI or UY)
Typhus (human)	Rickettsia prowazekii (YE)
Typhus (murine)	Rickettsia typhi (AV)

=== Viral bio-agents ===
Disease	Causative agent (military symbol)	Comments
Equine encephalitis (Eastern)	Eastern equine encephalitis virus (ZX)	
Equine encephalitis (Venezuelan)	Venezuelan equine encephalitis virus (FX)	
Equine encephalitis (Western)	Western equine encephalitis virus (EV)	
Japanese B encephalitis	Japanese encephalitis virus (AN)	
Marburg hemorrhagic fever (Marburg HF)	Marburg virus (MARV)	by the Soviet Union
Rift Valley fever	Rift Valley fever virus (FA)	
Smallpox	Variola virus (ZL)	
Yellow fever	Yellow fever virus (OJ or LU)	

=== Mycotic bio-agents ===
Disease	Causative agent (military symbol)
Coccidioidomycosis	Coccidioides immitis (OC)

=== Biological toxins ===
Toxin	Source of toxin (military symbol)
Abrin	Rosary pea (Abrus precatorius)
Botulinum toxins (A through G)	Clostridium botulinum bacteria or spores, and several other Clostridial species. (X or XR)
Ricin	Castor bean (Ricinus communis) (W or WA)
Saxitoxin	Various marine and brackish cyanobacteria, such as Anabaena, Aphanizomenon, Lyngbya, and Cylindrospermopsis (TZ)
Staphylococcal enterotoxin B	Staphylococcus aureus (UC or PG)
Tetrodotoxin	Various marine bacteria, including Vibrio alginolyticus, Pseudoalteromonas tetraodonis (PP)
Trichothecene mycotoxins	Various species of fungi, including Fusarium, Trichoderma, and Stachybotrys

=== Biological vectors ===
Vector (military symbol)	Disease
Mosquito (Aedes aegypti) (AP)	Malaria, Dengue fever, chikungunya, yellow fever, other arboviruses
Oriental flea (Xenopsylla cheopis)	Plague, murine typhus

=== Simulants ===
Simulants are organisms or substances which mimic physical or biological properties of real biological agents, without being pathogenic. They are used to study the efficiency of various dissemination techniques or the risks caused by the use of biological agents in bioterrorism. To simulate dispersal, attachment or the penetration depth in human or animal lungs, simulants must have particle sizes, specific weight and surface properties, similar to the simulated biological agent.

The typical size of simulants (1–5 μm) enables it to enter buildings with closed windows and doors and penetrate deep into the lungs. This bears a significant health risk, even if the biological agent is normally not pathogenic.

- Bacillus globigii (historically named Bacillus subtilis in the context of bio-agent simulants) (BG, BS, or U)
- Serratia marcescens (SM or P)
- Aspergillus fumigatus mutant C-2 (AF)
- Escherichia coli (EC)
- Bacillus thuringiensis (BT)
- Erwinia herbicola (current accepted name: Pantoea agglomerans) (EH)
- Fluorescent particles such as zinc cadmium sulfide, ZnCdS (FP)

== International law ==
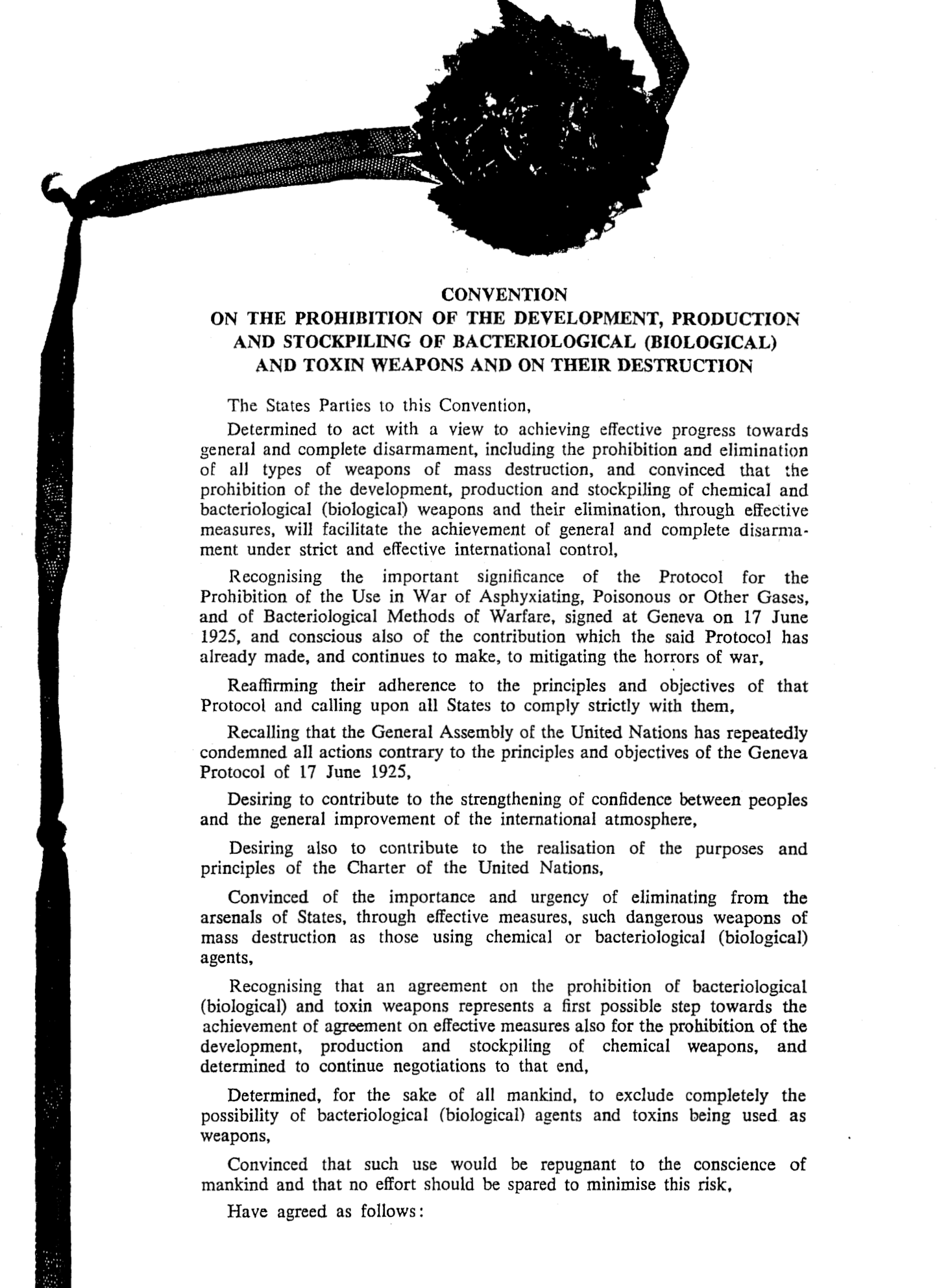
The Biological Weapons Convention

While the history of biological weapons use goes back more than six centuries to the siege of Caffa in 1346, international restrictions on biological weapons began only with the 1925 Geneva Protocol, which prohibits the use but not the possession or development of chemical and biological weapons in international armed conflicts. Upon ratification of the Geneva Protocol, several countries made reservations regarding its applicability and use in retaliation. Due to these reservations, it was in practice a "no-first-use" agreement only.

The 1972 Biological Weapons Convention supplements the Geneva Protocol by prohibiting the development, production, acquisition, transfer, stockpiling and use of biological weapons. Having entered into force on 26 March 1975, this agreement was the first multilateral disarmament treaty to ban the production of an entire category of weapons of mass destruction. As of March 2021, 183 states have become party to the treaty. The treaty is considered to have established a strong global norm against biological weapons, which is reflected in the treaty's preamble, stating that the use of biological weapons would be "repugnant to the conscience of mankind". However, its effectiveness has been limited due to insufficient institutional support and the absence of any formal verification regime to monitor compliance.

In 1985, the Australia Group was established, a multilateral export control regime of 43 countries aiming to prevent the proliferation of chemical and biological weapons.

In 2004, the United Nations Security Council passed Resolution 1540, which obligates all UN Member States to develop and enforce appropriate legal and regulatory measures against the proliferation of chemical, biological, radiological, and nuclear weapons and their means of delivery, in particular, to prevent the spread of weapons of mass destruction to non-state actors.

== See also ==
- Biological hazard
- Biological contamination
- Laboratory Response Network
- Pulsed ultraviolet light
