= Vomiting agent =

Emetic used as a chemical weapon

Vomiting agents are chemical weapon agents causing vomiting. Prolonged exposure can be lethal. They were used for the first time during WWI.

== Examples ==
- Adamsite
- Chloropicrin
- Diphenylchlorarsine
- Diphenylcyanoarsine
- Diphenylamincyanoarsine
