= Aoji-ri Chemical Complex =

Industrial complex in Kyŏnghŭng, North Korea

- Native name: 아오지리화학련합기업소 阿吾地化学聯合企業所
- Romanized name: Aoji-ri Hwahak Ryŏnhap Kiŏpso
- Formerly: Chosen Synthetic Oil Company 조선인조석유주식회사 朝鮮人造石油株式会社
- Company type: State-owned company
- Industry: Chemical
- Founded: 1937
- Headquarters: Haksong-ri, North Korea

The Aoji-ri Chemical Complex (Korean: 아오지리화학련합기업소) is a large industrial complex in Haksong-ri (formerly Aoji-ri), Kyonghung County, North Hamgyong Province, North Korea, which produces about 51 different products, including methane (35,000 tons per year), ammonia (26,000 tons per year), ammonium bicarbonate (100,000 tons per year), and coal tar derivatives (15,000 tons per year). It also allegedly produces blood agents and vomiting agents, including Adamsite.

The Chosen Synthetic Oil Company (朝鮮人造石油株式会社, Chōsen Jinzōsekiyu Kabushiki Kaisha; 조선인조석유주식회사; Chosŏn Injosŏgyu Chusikhoesa) opened the complex in 1937, originally to produce synthetic oil from the high-quality bituminous coal mined in the area. After the establishment of North Korea, the company was nationalised.

The facility is served by the Korean State Railway via Hoeam station on the Hoeam Line.
