= Hoeam Line =

Railway line in North Korea

Overview
- Other name(s): Ao Line (아오선 (阿梧線)); Obong Line (오봉선(梧鳳線))
- Native name: 회암선(灰岩線)
- Status: Operational
- Owner: Chosen Coal Industry Co. Railway (1938–1945); Korean State Railway (since 1945)
- Locale: North Hamgyŏng
- Termini: Haksong; Obong
- Stations: 4

Service
- Type: Heavy rail, Regional rail, Freight rail

History
- Opened: 9 September 1938 (Aoji−Hoeam); 14 September 1942 (Hoeam−Obong)

Technical
- Line length: 10.4 km (6.5 mi)
- Number of tracks: Single track
- Track gauge: 1,435 mm (4 ft 8 1/2 in) standard gauge
Route map
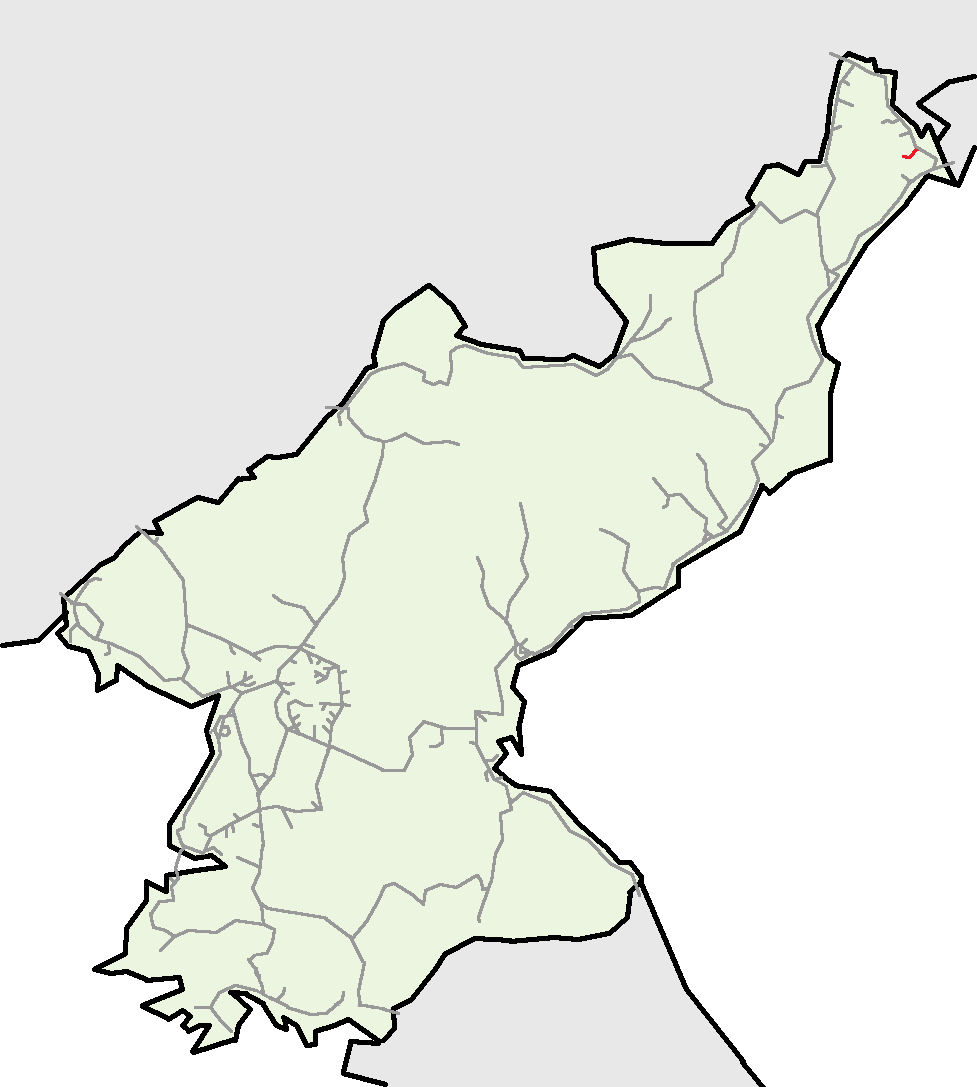

- Hoeam Line
- Hangul: 회암선
- Hanja: 灰岩線
- RR: Hoeamseon
- MR: Hoeamsŏn

The Hoeam Line is a 10.4 km (6.5 mi) non-electrified secondary line of the Korean State Railway in Kyŏnghŭng County, North Hamgyŏng province, North Korea, running from Haksong on the Hambuk Line to Obong.

== History ==
After the Chosen Synthetic Oil Company opened a large factory in Aoji-ri (now Haksong-ri) in 1937 to produce synthetic oil from the bituminous coal mined in the area, the Chosen Coal Industry Company built a railway line, called the Ao Line, to connect its mines to the chemical factory and to the South Manchuria Railway's North Chosen East Line, opening the first 5.9 km (3.7 mi) section from Aoji to Hoeam for passenger and freight service on 9 September 1938. The line was then extended, with a new 4.5 km (2.8 mi) section from Hoeam to Sinaoji (now called Ŭndŏk) and Obong opened on 14 September 1942.

Following the partition of Korea, the entirety of the Ao Line was located in the Soviet zone of occupation. The Provisional People’s Committee for North Korea nationalised all railways in the northern half of the country on 10 August 1946, and following the establishment of North Korea, the Korean State Railway was created. After the town of Aoji was renamed to Haksong, the line was given its current name.

== Route ==
A yellow background in the "Distance" box indicates that section of the line is not electrified.

Distance (km)		Station Name		Former Name		
Total	S2S	Transcribed	Chosŏn'gŭl (Hanja)	Transcribed	Chosŏn'gŭl (Hanja)	Connections
0.0	0.0	Haksong	학송 (鶴松)	Aoji	아오지 (阿吾地)	Hambuk Line
5.9	5.9	Hoeam	회암 (灰岩)			
7.5	1.6	Ŭndŏk	은덕 (恩德)	Sinaoji	신아오지 (新阿吾地)	
~~10.4~~	~~2.9~~	Obong	오봉 (梧鳳)			Closed.
