= Methyldichloroarsine =

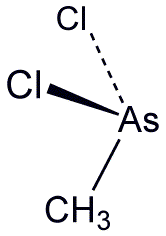

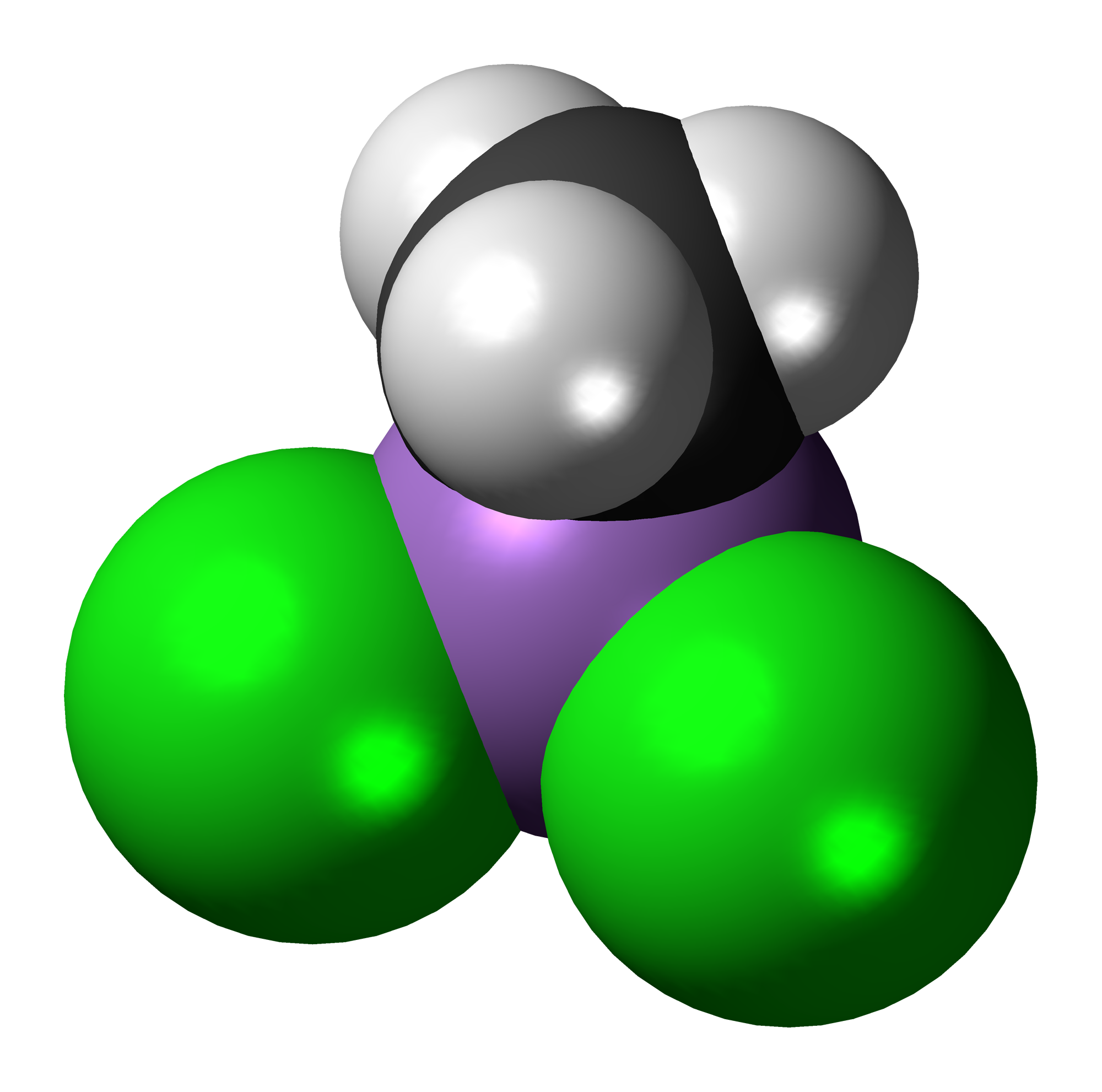

Names
- Preferred IUPAC name Methylarsonous dichloride

Identifiers
CAS Number	593-89-5
3D model (JSmol)	Interactive image
Abbreviations	MD MDA; MDCA
ChemSpider	55089
ECHA InfoCard	100.240.769
MeSH	Methyldichloroarsine
PubChem CID	61142
CompTox Dashboard (EPA)	DTXSID0060480
- InChI: InChI=1S/CH3AsCl2/c1-2(3)4/h1H3 Key: VXRMBBLRHSRVDK-UHFFFAOYSA-N; InChI=1S/CH3AsCl2/c1-2(3)4/h1H3 Key: VXRMBBLRHSRVDK-UHFFFAOYSA-N; InChI=1/CH3AsCl2/c1-2(3)4/h1H3 Key: VXRMBBLRHSRVDK-UHFFFAOYAY
- SMILES: Cl[As](Cl)C

Properties
Chemical formula	CH_{3}AsCl_{2}
Molar mass	160.86 g·mol^{−1}
Appearance	Colorless liquid
Density	1.836 g/cm^{3}
Melting point	−55 °C (−67 °F; 218 K)
Boiling point	133 °C (271 °F; 406 K)
Solubility in water	reacts

Hazards
- Occupational safety and health (OHS/OSH)
Main hazards	Highly toxic, Irritant
- Except where otherwise noted, data are given for materials in their standard state (at 25 °C [77 °F], 100 kPa). verify (what is ?) Infobox references

Methyldichloroarsine, sometimes abbreviated "MD" and also known as methyl Dick, is an organoarsenic compound with the formula CH_{3}AsCl_{2}. This colourless volatile liquid is a highly toxic vesicant that has been used in chemical warfare.

== History ==
German chemists weaponized methyldichloroarsine during World War I, between 1917 and 1918. It was the first organoarsenic compound to be weaponized.

== Structure, synthesis, reactivity ==
Focusing on the arsenic center, the molecule geometry is trigonal pyramidal with the Cl-As-Cl and C-As-Cl angles approaching 90° (see image). Virtually all related arsenic(III) compounds adopt similar structures.

Methyldichloroarsine is produced by the reaction of methylmagnesium chloride and arsenic trichloride:

AsCl_{3} + CH_{3}MgCl → CH_{3}AsCl_{2} + MgCl_{2}

Typically such syntheses are conducted in ether or THF solutions and typically the product is isolated by distillation. Use of larger amounts of the magnesium reagent affords greater amounts of dimethylchloroarsine ((CH_{3})_{2}AsCl) and trimethylarsine ((CH_{3})_{3}As).

In World War I, the German manufacturing method consisted of a three-step reaction beginning with methylation of sodium arsenite with dimethyl sulfate:

2 Na_{3}AsO_{3} + (CH_{3}O)_{2}SO_{2} → 2 CH_{3}AsO(ONa)_{2} + Na_{2}SO_{4}

followed by reduction of the disodium monomethylarsonate with sulfur dioxide:

CH_{3}AsO(ONa)_{2} + SO_{2} → CH_{3}AsO + Na_{2}SO_{4},

subsequently reacting the monomethylarsine oxide thus formed with hydrogen chloride to yield methyldichloroarsine:

CH_{3}AsO + 2 HCl → CH_{3}AsCl_{2} + H_{2}O

The As-Cl bonds in MD are susceptible toward nucleophilic attack. Reduction of MD with sodium metal affords the polymer [CH_{3}As]_{n}.

== Use as a weapon ==
=== Symptoms of poisoning ===
Although some of its symptoms resemble those from poison ivy, other symptoms include irritation to the eyes and to the nose, although blistering may be delayed for hours. Other symptoms include: dermal burns with vesicle formation; blepharospasm and photophobia. Convulsions, abdominal pain, coughing, and shortness of breath with damage to the respiratory system can be delayed for about three to five days; hemolysis can also occur.

MD is not persistent, meaning that it will dissipate after a short time. It is lethal. The LCt/50 for MD is about 3,000 mg/(min * m^{3}).

=== Protection ===
Besides avoiding situations in which it might be used, an activated charcoal filter and a protective mask can help protect against MD. It should, however, be noted that MD can penetrate rubber, so some masks and clothing are ineffective. Other protective clothing, such as full body protection, are useful as well. Among the agents useful for decontamination of MD are bleach and caustic soda.

== See also ==
- Ethyldichloroarsine
- Phenyldichloroarsine
- Lewisite
