= Blister agent =

Chemicals that result in blistering and skin irritation and damaging

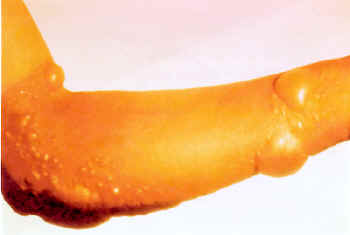
Blister agents are named for their ability to cause large, painful water blisters on the bodies of those affected.

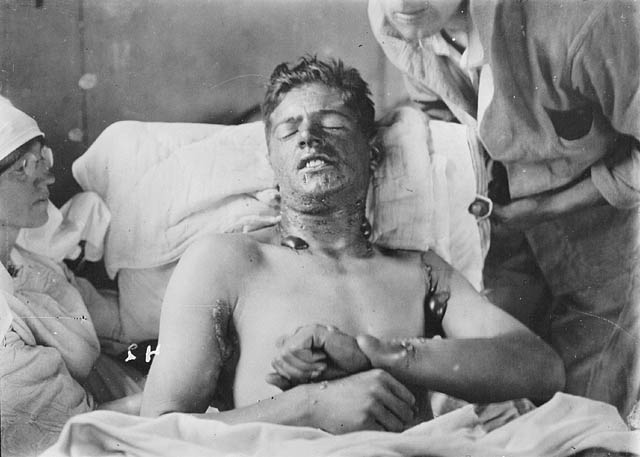
Soldier with moderate mustard gas burns sustained during World War I showing characteristic bullae on neck, armpit and hands

A blister agent (or vesicant) is a chemical compound that causes severe skin, eye and mucosal pain and irritation in the form of severe chemical burns resulting in fluid filled blisters. Named for their ability to cause vesication, blister agent refers in common parlance to those agents which are developed for, or have been in the past utilized as chemical weapons, though some naturally occurring terpenoids such as cantharidin and T2 mycotoxin fall under this class. Exposure to blister agents is widely incapacitating, but often precipitates a delayed effect, with symptoms developing one to twenty four hours following the initial contact with the agent. Treatment for acute exposure is largely supportive, with the exception of Lewisite, for which an antidote is available. Overall lethality as a direct result of exposure is low, but increases with dose. Despite low overall lethality, blister agent exposure requires extensive supportive treatment, and can cause significant strain on medical systems. In some cases, blister agents have limited medical uses including for purposes of wart removal.

== Blister agents used in warfare ==
Blister agents relevant to warfare are generally divided into three categories:

- Mustards - A family of related agents whose odor is similar to mustard plants, garlic, or horseradish, giving them their name. This family includes two primary subtypes:
  - Sulfur mustards – A subfamily of sulfur-based agents, including what was referred to as mustard gas during World War I.
  - Nitrogen mustards – A subfamily of agents similar to the sulfur mustards, but based on nitrogen instead of sulfur, of which three varieties exist which are significant to warfare.
- Organoarsenics - A family of agents including ethyldichloroarsine (ED), methyldichloroarsine (MD) and phenyldichloroarsine (PD).
- Lewisite – An early blister agent that was developed, but not used, during World War I. It was effectively rendered obsolete with the development of dimercaprol in the 1940s.

Some sources erroneously report phosgene oxime, a nettle agent as a blister agent. Because it causes urticaria, not vesication, the grouping is not consistent with the accepted categorization of the blister agents.

== Effects ==
Exposure to a weaponized blister agent can cause a number of life-threatening symptoms, including:

- Severe skin, eye and mucosal pain and irritation
- Skin erythema with large fluid blisters that heal slowly and may become infected
- Tearing, conjunctivitis, corneal damage
- Mild respiratory distress to marked airway damage

All blister agents currently known are denser than air, and are readily absorbed through the eyes, lungs, and skin. Exposure to blister agents may precipitate a wide variety of long term effects due primarily to their general statuses as carcinogens, and their abilities to cause permanent cellular damage.
