= VS (nerve agent) =

Names
- Preferred IUPAC name S-{2-[Di(propan-2-yl)amino]ethyl} O-ethyl ethylphosphonothioate

Identifiers
CAS Number	73835-17-3
3D model (JSmol)	Interactive image
ChemSpider	500042
PubChem CID	575137
CompTox Dashboard (EPA)	DTXSID601020102
- InChI: InChI=1S/C12H28NO2PS/c1-7-15-16(14,8-2)17-10-9-13(11(3)4)12(5)6/h11-12H,7-10H2,1-6H3 Key: KQIZEWYIQBLXPT-UHFFFAOYSA-N
- SMILES: CCOP(=O)(CC)SCCN(C(C)C)C(C)C

Properties
Chemical formula	C_{12}H_{28}NO_{2}PS
Molar mass	281.39 g·mol^{−1}
- Except where otherwise noted, data are given for materials in their standard state (at 25 °C [77 °F], 100 kPa). Infobox references

VS is a nerve agent of the V-series. Its chemical structure is very similar to the VX nerve agent, but the methyl group on the phosphorus atom is replaced by an ethyl group.

== See also ==
- VX (nerve agent)
