= Sodium arsenite =

Names
- IUPAC name sodium arsenite
- Other names sodium arsenate(III)

Identifiers
CAS Number	7784-46-5
3D model (JSmol)	Interactive image
ChEBI	CHEBI:29678
ChEMBL	ChEMBL1909078
ChemSpider	22980
DrugBank	DB18508
ECHA InfoCard	100.029.154
EC Number	232-070-5
KEGG	C11906
PubChem CID	443495
RTECS number	CG3675000
UNII	48OVY2OC72
UN number	1686 2027
CompTox Dashboard (EPA)	DTXSID5020104
- InChI: Key: PTLRDCMBXHILCL-UHFFFAOYSA-M; InChI=1S/AsHO2.Na/c2-1-3;/h(H,2,3);/q;+1/p-1
- SMILES: [O-][As]=O.[Na+]

Properties
Chemical formula	NaAsO_{2}
Molar mass	129.91 g/mol
Appearance	white or grayish powder hygroscopic
Density	1.87 g/cm ^{3}
Melting point	550 °C (1,022 °F; 823 K) decomposes
Solubility in water	156 g/100 mL
Solubility	slightly soluble in alcohol

Hazards
- GHS labelling
Pictograms	(GHS06: Toxic) (GHS08: Health hazard) (GHS09: Environmental hazard)
Signal word	Danger
Hazard statements	H300, H301, H310, H331, H350, H410
Precautionary statements	P201, P202, P261, P262, P264, P270, P271, P273, P280, P281, P301+P310, P302+P350, P302+P352, P304+P340, P308+P313, P310, P311, P312, P321, P322, P330, P361, P363, P391, P403+P233, P405, P501
NFPA 704 (fire diamond)	4 0 0
- Lethal dose or concentration (LD, LC)
LD_{50} (median dose)	41 mg/kg (rat, oral)
- NIOSH (US health exposure limits)
PEL (Permissible)	[1910.1018] TWA 0.010 mg/m^{3}
REL (Recommended)	Ca C 0.002 mg/m^{3} [15-minute]
IDLH (Immediate danger)	Ca [5 mg/m^{3} (as As)]
Safety data sheet (SDS)	External MSDS
- Except where otherwise noted, data are given for materials in their standard state (at 25 °C [77 °F], 100 kPa). verify (what is ?) Infobox references

Sodium arsenite usually refers to the inorganic compound with the formula NaAsO_{2}. Also called sodium meta-arsenite, it is an inorganic polymer consisting of the infinite chains [AsO_{2}]^{n−}_{n} associated with sodium cations, Na^{+}. The polymer backbone has the connectivity -O-As(O^{−})-. backbone. Sodium ortho-arsenite is Na_{3}AsO_{3}. Both compounds are colourless solids. A mixture of sodium meta-arsenite and sodium ortho-arsenite is produced by treating arsenic trioxide with sodium carbonate or sodium hydroxide. Sodium arsenite is amorphous, typically being obtained as a powder or as a glassy mass.

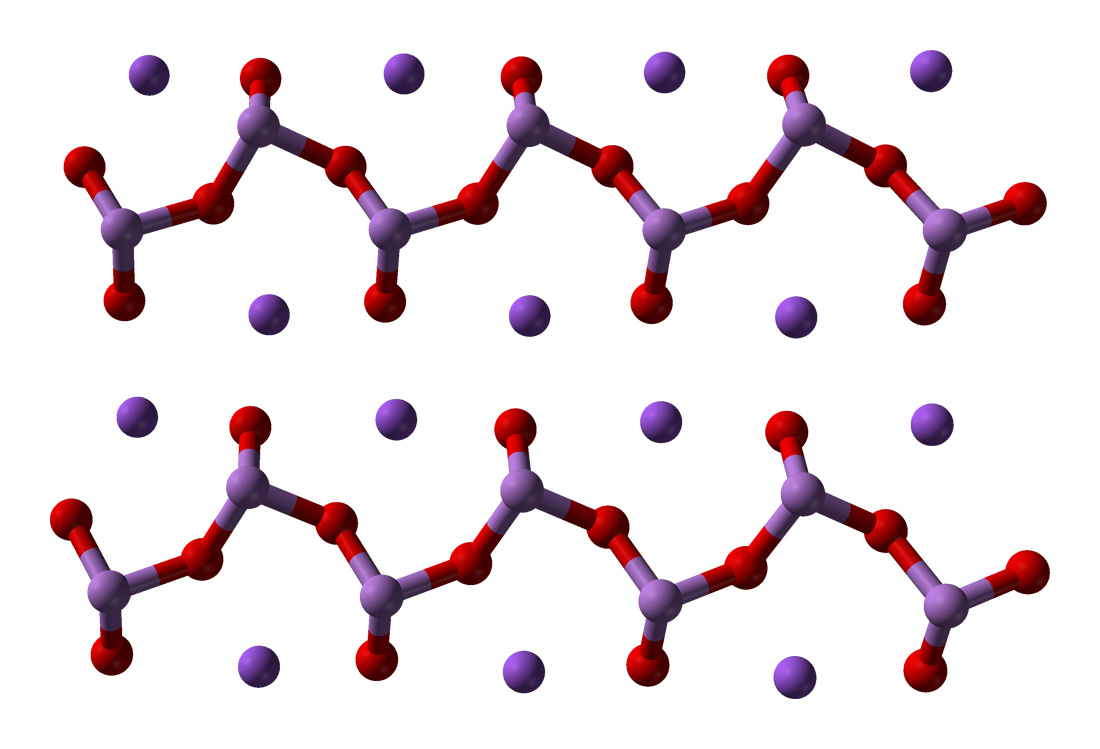

== Health effects ==
Sodium arsenite can be inhaled or absorbed through the skin. Along with its known carcinogenic and teratogenic effects, contact with the substance can yield symptoms such as skin irritation, burns, itching, thickened skin, rash, loss of pigment, poor appetite, a metallic or garlic taste, stomach pain, nausea, vomiting, diarrhea, convulsions, decreased blood pressure, and headache. Severe acute poisoning may lead to nervous system damage resulting in weakness, poor coordination, or “pins and needles” sensations, eventual paralysis, and death.

== Application ==
Sodium arsenites are primarily used as a pesticide, but has other uses such as hide preservative, antiseptic, dyeing, and soaps.

Sodium arsenite is an appropriate chemical stressor to induce the production of heat shock proteins, and the formation of cytoplasmic stress granules.

Sodium arsenite can be used as a reducing agent in organic chemistry, as it is able to reduce a trihaloalkane to a dihaloalkane:

CHBr_{3} + Na_{3}AsO_{3} + NaOH → CH_{2}Br_{2} + Na_{3}AsO_{4} + NaBr

== Safety ==
The LD_{50} (oral, mouse) is 40 mg/kg or 150 mg/kg (dermal, rat)
