= Adamsite =

- Structural formula of adamsite

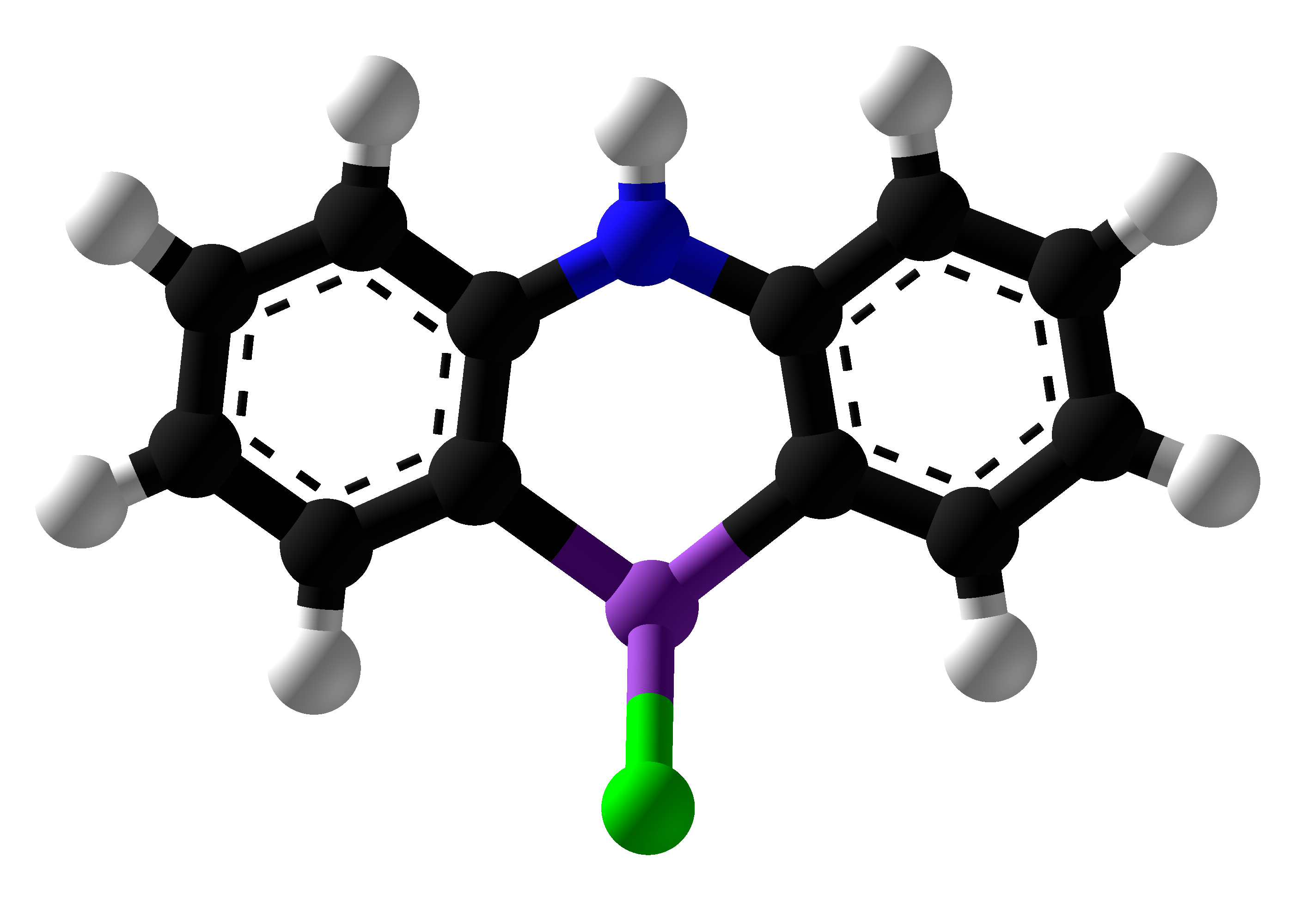

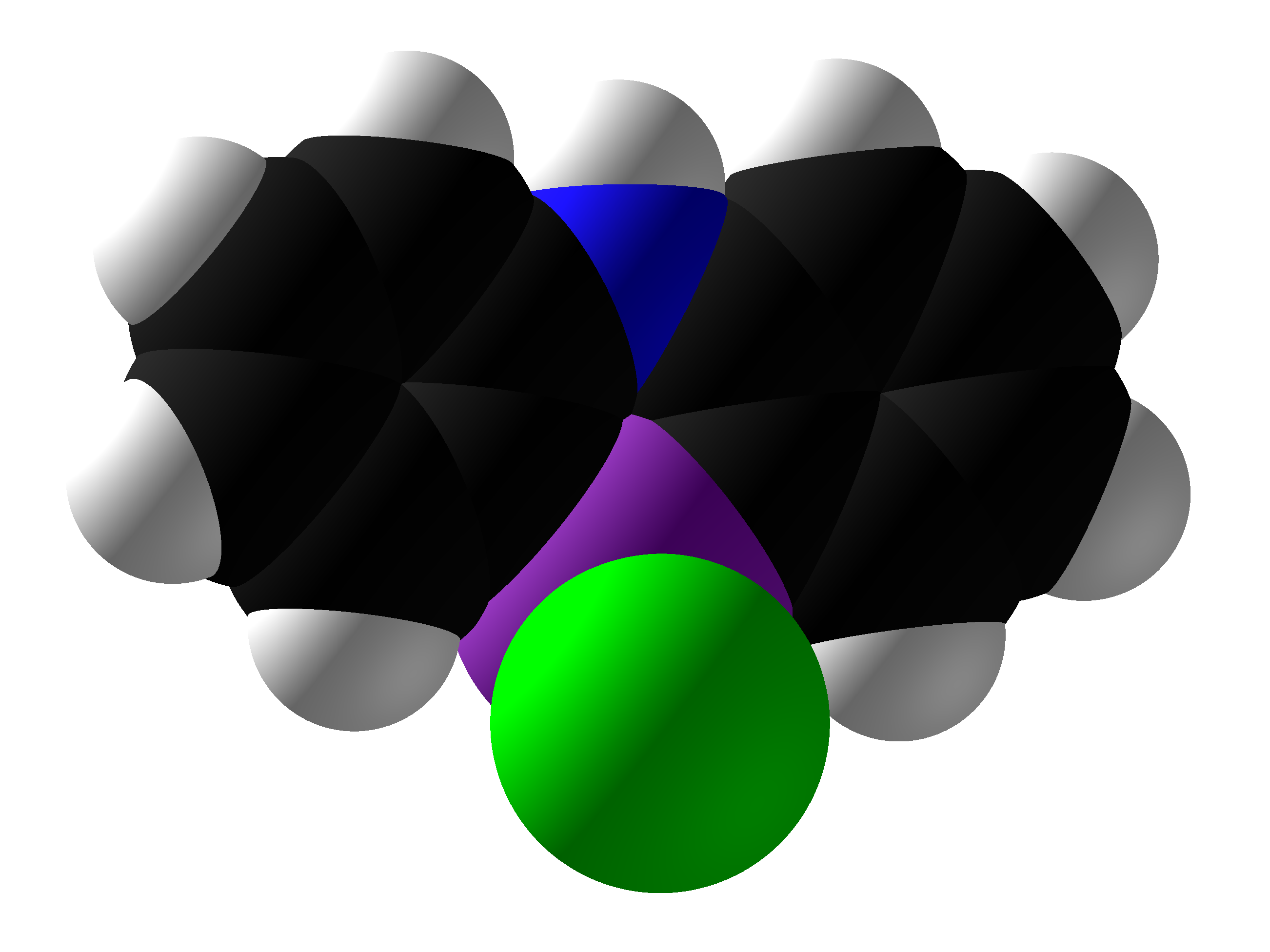

Names
- Preferred IUPAC name 10-Chloro-5,10-dihydrophenazarsinine
- Other names 10-Chloro-5H-phenarsazinine; Diphenylaminechlorarsine

Identifiers
CAS Number	578-94-9
3D model (JSmol)	Interactive image; Interactive image
Abbreviations	DM
ChemSpider	10884
ECHA InfoCard	100.008.577
EC Number	209-433-1
MeSH	Phenarsazine+chloride
PubChem CID	11362
UNII	QI287G628L
CompTox Dashboard (EPA)	DTXSID6041890
- InChI: InChI=1S/C12H9AsClN/c14-13-9-5-1-3-7-11(9)15-12-8-4-2-6-10(12)13/h1-8,15H Key: PBNSPNYJYOYWTA-UHFFFAOYSA-N; InChI=1/C12H9AsClN/c14-13-9-5-1-3-7-11(9)15-12-8-4-2-6-10(12)13/h1-8,15H Key: PBNSPNYJYOYWTA-UHFFFAOYAA
- SMILES: Cl[As]2c1ccccc1Nc3c2cccc3; Cl[As]1C2=C(NC3=C1C=CC=C3)C=CC=C2

Properties
Chemical formula	C_{12}H_{9}AsClN
Molar mass	277.58 g·mol^{−1}
Appearance	Yellow-green crystals
Melting point	195 °C (383 °F; 468 K)
Boiling point	410 °C (770 °F; 683 K)
Solubility in water	0.064 g dm^{−3}
- Except where otherwise noted, data are given for materials in their standard state (at 25 °C [77 °F], 100 kPa). verify (what is ?) Infobox references

Adamsite or DM is an organic compound; technically, an arsenical diphenylaminechlorarsine, that can be used as a riot control agent. DM belongs to the group of chemical warfare agents known as vomiting agents or sneeze gases. First synthesized in Germany by Heinrich Otto Wieland in 1915, it was independently developed by the US chemist Roger Adams, after whom it is named, at the University of Illinois in 1918.

== Composition ==
DM is an odourless crystalline compound with a very low vapour pressure. The colour of the crystals ranges from bright yellow to dark green depending on the purity. It is readily soluble in some organic solvents (e.g., acetone, dichloromethane), but nearly insoluble in water. In vaporous form it appears as a canary yellow smoke.

== Effects ==
Adamsite is usually dispersed as an aerosol, making the upper respiratory tract the primary site of action. Although the effects are similar to those caused by typical riot control agents (e.g. CS), they are slower in onset but longer in duration, often lasting for 12 or more hours. After a latency period of 5–10 minutes irritation of the eyes, lungs and mucous membranes develops followed by headache, nausea and persistent vomiting.

== Usage ==
DM was produced and stockpiled by the British and the United States at the end of World War I. It was used by the British during the incursions at Murmansk and Arkhangelsk. It is now regarded as obsolete and has been widely replaced by riot control agents such as CS which are less toxic and more rapid in the onset of symptoms. Early battlefield use was intended to be via "adamsite candles". These were large metal cans or tubes (weighing approximately 5 pounds [2.3 kg]) which contained a smoke composition made of adamsite plus a slow burning pyrotechnic composition. A series of candles were lit and the adamsite-laden smoke allowed to drift towards the enemy.

In the United States, it was used against the Bonus Army who demonstrated in Washington, D.C., in 1932, reportedly causing the death and serious injury of several children who had accompanied their parents on the protests. It was again used in the Vietnam War.

Japan's Unit 731 exposed victims to adamsite, amongst other chemical and viral agents.

In 2003, North Korea was reportedly producing adamsite at its Aoji-ri Chemical Complex in Haksong-ri, Kyŏnghŭng county for stockpiling. DM was allegedly used by Venezuelan authorities in the 2014–17 Venezuelan protests and described as "green gas" with reports of protesters vomiting following exposure and regional human rights groups condemning the usage of "green gas", stating that its usage is "internationally banned".
