= Phenyldichloroarsine =

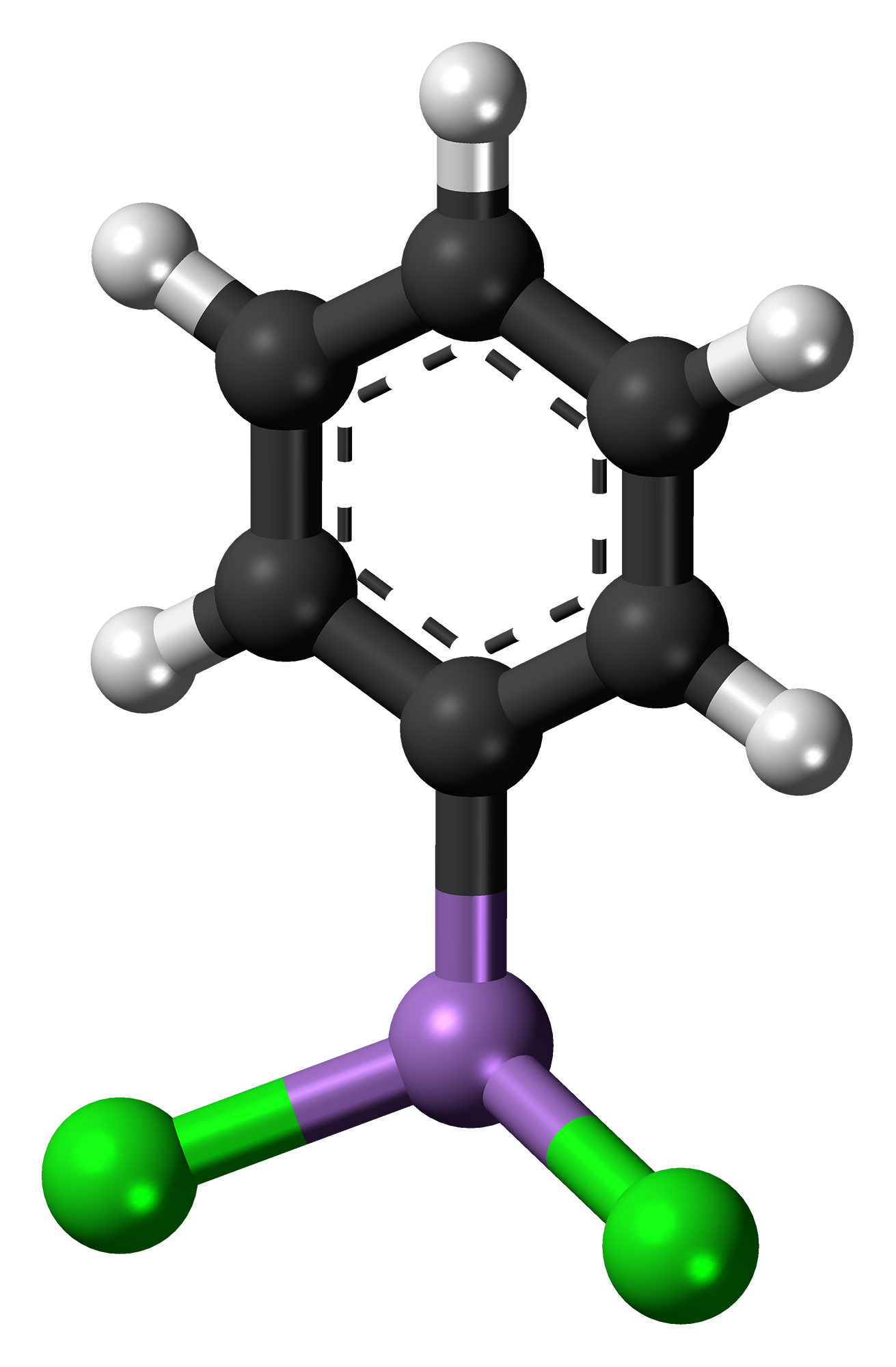

Names
- Preferred IUPAC name Phenylarsonous dichloride
- Other names Dichlorophenylarsane; Dichloro(phenyl)arsine

Identifiers
CAS Number	696-28-6
3D model (JSmol)	Interactive image
Abbreviations	PD (NATO)
ChemSpider	12238
ECHA InfoCard	100.010.721
EC Number	211-791-9
PubChem CID	12762
RTECS number	CH5425000
UNII	KK93BBF49U
CompTox Dashboard (EPA)	DTXSID7061011
- InChI: InChI=1S/C6H5AsCl2/c8-7(9)6-4-2-1-3-5-6/h1-5H Key: UDHDFEGCOJAVRE-UHFFFAOYSA-N
- SMILES: Cl[As](Cl)c1ccccc1

Properties
Chemical formula	C_{6}H_{5}AsCl_{2}
Molar mass	222.9315 g/mol
Appearance	Colorless liquid
Density	1.65 g/cm^{3} (at 20 °C)
Melting point	−20 °C (−4 °F; 253 K)
Boiling point	252 to 255 °C (486 to 491 °F; 525 to 528 K)
Solubility in water	Reacts
Solubility	acetone, ether, benzene
log P	3.060
Vapor pressure	0.033
Henry's law constant (k_{H})	3.00E-05 atm·m^{3}/mole
Atmospheric OH rate constant	1.95E-12 cm^{3}/molecule·s

Hazards
- Occupational safety and health (OHS/OSH)
Main hazards	Flammability, incapacitation, blistering
NFPA 704 (fire diamond)	4 1 0
Flash point	16 °C (61 °F; 289 K)
- Lethal dose or concentration (LD, LC)
LD_{50} (median dose)	2,500 mg·min/m^{3}
- NIOSH (US health exposure limits)
PEL (Permissible)	0.5 mg/m^{2}
Safety data sheet (SDS)	New Jersey MSDS
- Except where otherwise noted, data are given for materials in their standard state (at 25 °C [77 °F], 100 kPa). verify (what is ?) Infobox references

Phenyldichloroarsine, also known by its wartime name phenyl Dick and its NATO abbreviation PD, is an organic arsenical vesicant (blister agent) and vomiting agent developed by Germany and France for use as a chemical warfare agent during World War I. The agent is known by multiple synonyms.

== History ==
PD was prepared during 1917–18 in Germany and France, during World War II it was prepared in Germany.

== Chemical characteristics ==
=== General ===
Phenyldichloroarsine is an odorless, colorless substance that can form hydrochloric acid upon contact with water. The reaction with water is very slow, the substance sinks, and the reaction is considered non-hazardous. Another product of hydrolysis is phenylarsenious acid, which is a severe irritant to the mucous membranes and skin. In an impure state, phenyldichloroarsine may have a slight brown color, in its purest form though there is no color and the substance has an oily texture. An impure solution of PD also emits a characteristically unpleasant horseradish or garlic-like odor, which is detectable at 0.1 ppm.

Phenyldichloroarsine is one of four organic arsenicals, the other three are lewisite (L), methyldichloroarsine (MD), and ethyldichloroarsine (ED). PD is considered an analog of lewisite. At its freezing point, -20 °C, PD becomes a microcrystalline solid mass. The compound has a C-metalloid bond between the phenyl group and the arsenic and two covalent bonds between the arsenic and the chlorine.

=== Synthesis ===
Phenyldichloroarsine is produced by reacting arsenic trichloride with benzene and catalytic anhydrous aluminum chloride or with diphenylmercury

== Uses ==
Phenyldichloroarsine is an obsolete chemical warfare agent and is classified as a vesicant and a vomiting/incapacitating agent. It was used as a weapon during World War I, where it showed itself as less effective than other vomiting agents. Phenyldichloroarsine is an arsenical vesicant which can be mixed with mustard agents for use in chemical warfare. PD was developed for use in wet environments, because of its tendency to persist in cool and shaded areas. Phenyldichloroarsine can have a persistence lasting anywhere from 2 to 7 days under usual environmental conditions. In open areas, it is more useful as a vomiting agent but in closed-in areas, such as basements, trenches and caves, it is highly effective because of its "extreme" vapor density. Phenyldichloroarsine has also been used by banks and other high-security facilities to defend against security breaches.

== Biological effects ==
PD damages the eyes, lungs, throat and nasal membranes. PD immediately affects the eyes and blindness can result, though it requires high doses. It also induces nausea and vomiting, an inhalation of as little as 5-50 milligrams can induce severe vomiting. Long-term exposure to PD can cause systemic damage by replacing calcium with arsenic, extensive bone marrow damage can also result. Due to PD being easily recognized in the field and a relatively fast rate for decontamination procedures to become effective, the chemical is not as useful as other blister agents. The blistering resultant from PD exposure may also be delayed, for as little as 30 minutes, or as long as 32 hours depending upon the concentration of the dose.

The molecular toxicology of PD is not well understood, but a 1986 U.S. Army-sponsored report did shed some light on that area. The Army report showed that PD penetrated the red blood cell membrane and interacted with something inside the cell. The study also found that hemoglobin was not responsible for "holding" the PD in its bond with the erythrocytes (red blood cells), instead glutathione was found to be a more likely interacting with PD inside the cell.

== See also ==
- Diphenylchlorarsine
