= VM (nerve agent) =

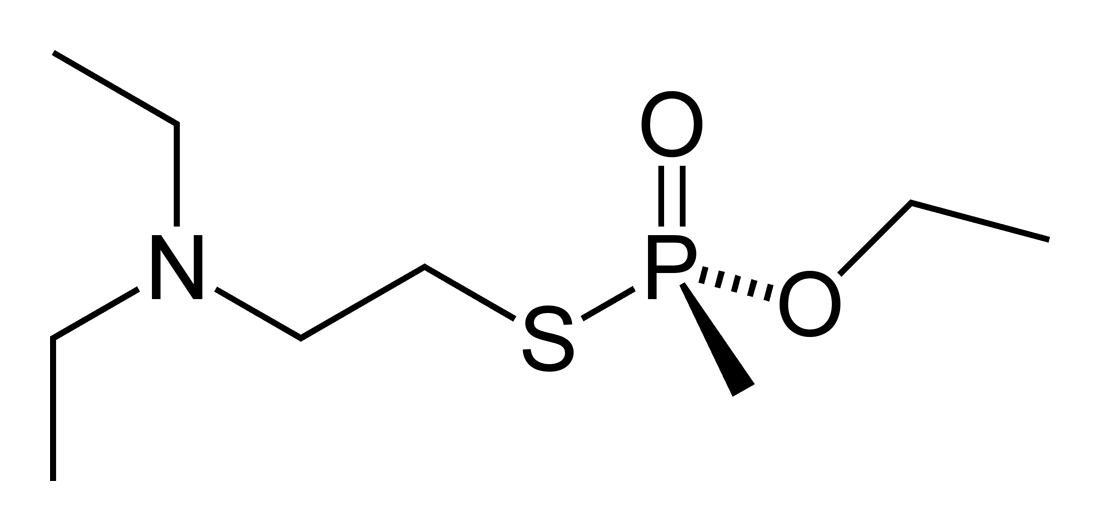
- Skeletal formula of VM

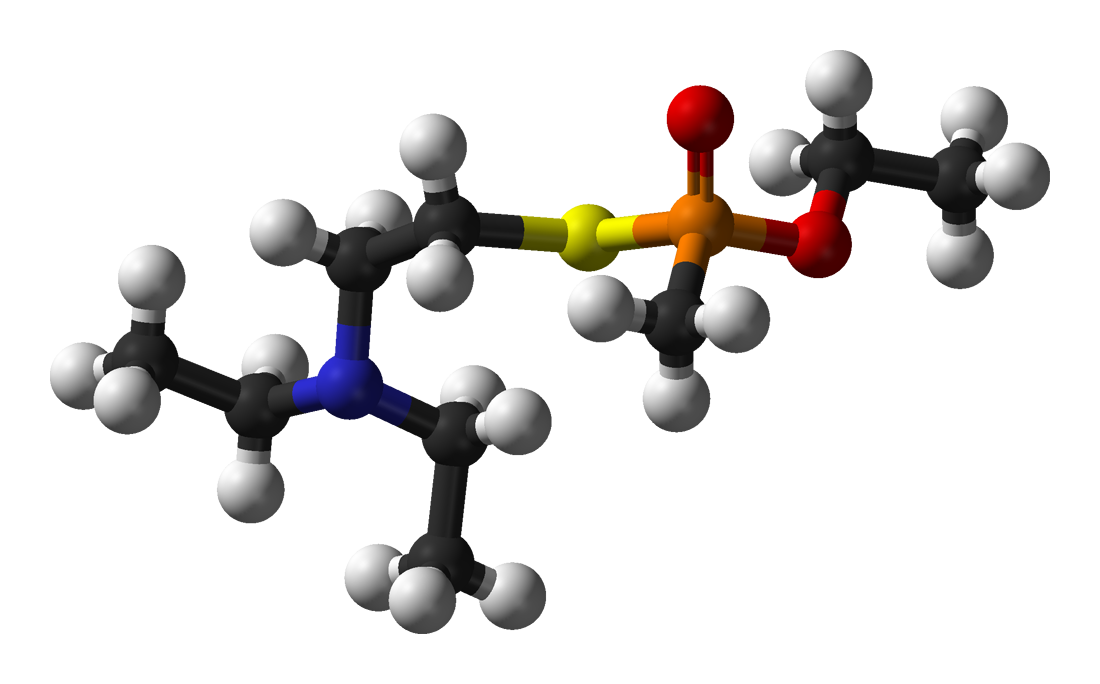
- Ball-and-stick model of VM

Names
- Preferred IUPAC name S-[2-(Diethylamino)ethyl] O-ethyl methylphosphonothioate

Identifiers
CAS Number	21770-86-5
3D model (JSmol)	Interactive image
ChemSpider	28577
PubChem CID	30800
UNII	2XM5EU7NUM
CompTox Dashboard (EPA)	DTXSID40865014
- InChI: InChI=1S/C9H22NO2PS/c1-5-10(6-2)8-9-14-13(4,11)12-7-3/h5-9H2,1-4H3 Key: BKWMHKJLXIRTAI-UHFFFAOYSA-N; InChI=1/C9H22NO2PS/c1-5-10(6-2)8-9-14-13(4,11)12-7-3/h5-9H2,1-4H3 Key: BKWMHKJLXIRTAI-UHFFFAOYAU
- SMILES: O=P(OCC)(SCCN(CC)CC)C

Properties
Chemical formula	C_{9}H_{22}NO_{2}PS
Molar mass	239.32 g/mol
- Except where otherwise noted, data are given for materials in their standard state (at 25 °C [77 °F], 100 kPa). verify (what is ?) Infobox references

VM (Edemo) is a "V-series" nerve agent closely related to the better-known VX nerve agent.

Like most of the agents in the V-series (with the exception of VX), VM has not been extensively studied outside of military science. Little is known about this chemical compound other than its chemical formula.

It is commonly theorized that the so-called "second-generation" V series agents came from a Cold War era Russian chemical weapons development program. They may have been developed sometime between 1950 and 1990. They have similar lethal dose levels to VX (between 10 and 50 mg) and have similar symptoms and method of action to other nerve agents that act on cholinesterase. The treatment remains the same, but the window for effectively treating second generation V series seizures is shorter. In addition to the standard seizures, some of the second generation V series agents are known to cause comas.
