= Kyonghung County =

Kyonghung County 경흥군
- County

Korean transcription(s)
  - Hanja: 慶興郡
  - McCune-Reischauer: Kyŏnghŭng-gun
  - Revised Romanization: Gyeongheung-gun
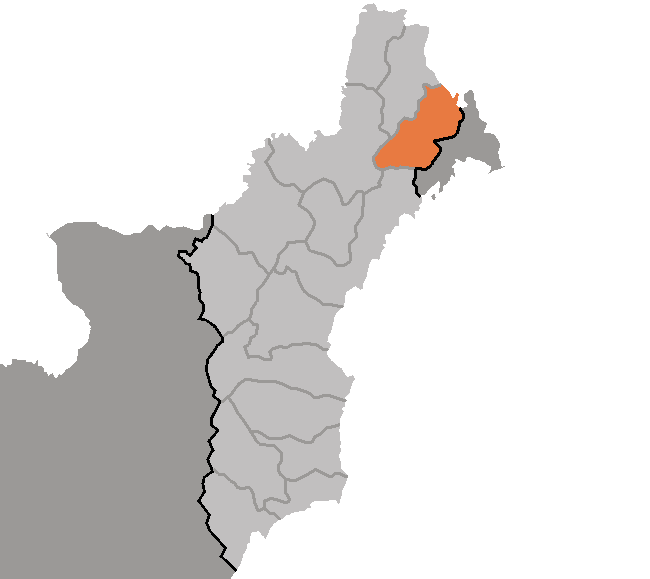
- Map of North Hamgyong showing the location of Kyonghung
- Country: North Korea
- Province: North Hamgyong Province
- Administrative divisions: 1 ŭp;, 3 workers' districts, 12 ri

Area
  - Total: 920 km^{2} (360 sq mi)

Population (2008 census)
  - Total: 107,327
  - Density: 120/km^{2} (300/sq mi)

Kyŏnghŭng County is a kun, or county, in North Hamgyong province, North Korea. Formerly known as Ŭndŏk County (Korean: 은덕군; Hancha: 恩德郡), from 1977 to 2010.

The county borders the People's Republic of China to the northeast. Except for the southwest, it is dominated by low hills, with occasional plains. The highest point is Songjinsan, which is 1,146 m (3,760 ft). The dominant river is the Tumen, which separates the county from China. The level ground along the Tumen is developed, but approximately 80% of the county is forested.

Mining, particularly coal mining, is the chief industry in Undok, where lignite is found; Undok is the site of the Aoji Coal Mine. In addition, farming and livestock raising are widespread. The chief crops are maize, rice, soybeans, and potatoes. The Aoji-ri Chemical Complex is located in the county as well.

Undok lies on the Hambuk Line and Hoeam Line railroads.

== History ==
Under Joseon period "Kyunghung", the ancient name of Undok, was one of the six post/garrisons (Korean: 육진; Hancha: 六鎭) established under the order of King Sejong the Great of Joseon in 1433, to safeguard his people from the hostile Chinese and Manchurian nomads living in Manchuria.

== Notable personalities ==
- Lee Gyung-Rok (Korean: 이경록; Hancha: 李慶祿) the prefect of Kyŏnghŭng (Korean: 경흥 부사; Hancha: 慶興府使)

== Administrative divisions ==
Kyŏnghŭng County is divided into 1 town ("Ŭp") 12 villages ("Ri") and 3 worker's districts ("Rodongjagu").

	Chosŏn'gŭl	Hancha
Ŭndŏk-ŭp	은덕읍	恩德邑
Myŏngryong-rodongjagu	명룡노동자구	明龍勞動者區
Obong-rodongjagu	오봉노동자구	梧鳳勞動者區
Ryongyŏl-lodongjagu	룡연노동자구	龍淵勞動者區
Angil-li	안길리	安吉里
Changp'yŏng-ri	장평리	長坪里
Ch'ŏlju-ri	철주리	鐵柱里
Haksong-ri	학송리	鶴松里
Kŭmsong-ri	금송리	金松里
Kwirang-ri	귀락리	貴洛里
Myŏngdŏng-ri	명덕리	明德里
Rokya-ri	록야리	鹿野里
Sin'asal-li	신아산리	新阿山里
Songhang-ri	송학리	松鶴里
Songsal-li	송산리	松山里
T'aeyang-ri	태양리	太陽里

== See also ==
- Geography of North Korea
- Administrative divisions of North Korea
- Tumen River Bridge
