= Diphenylchlorarsine =

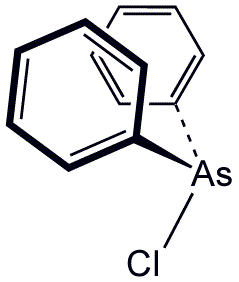

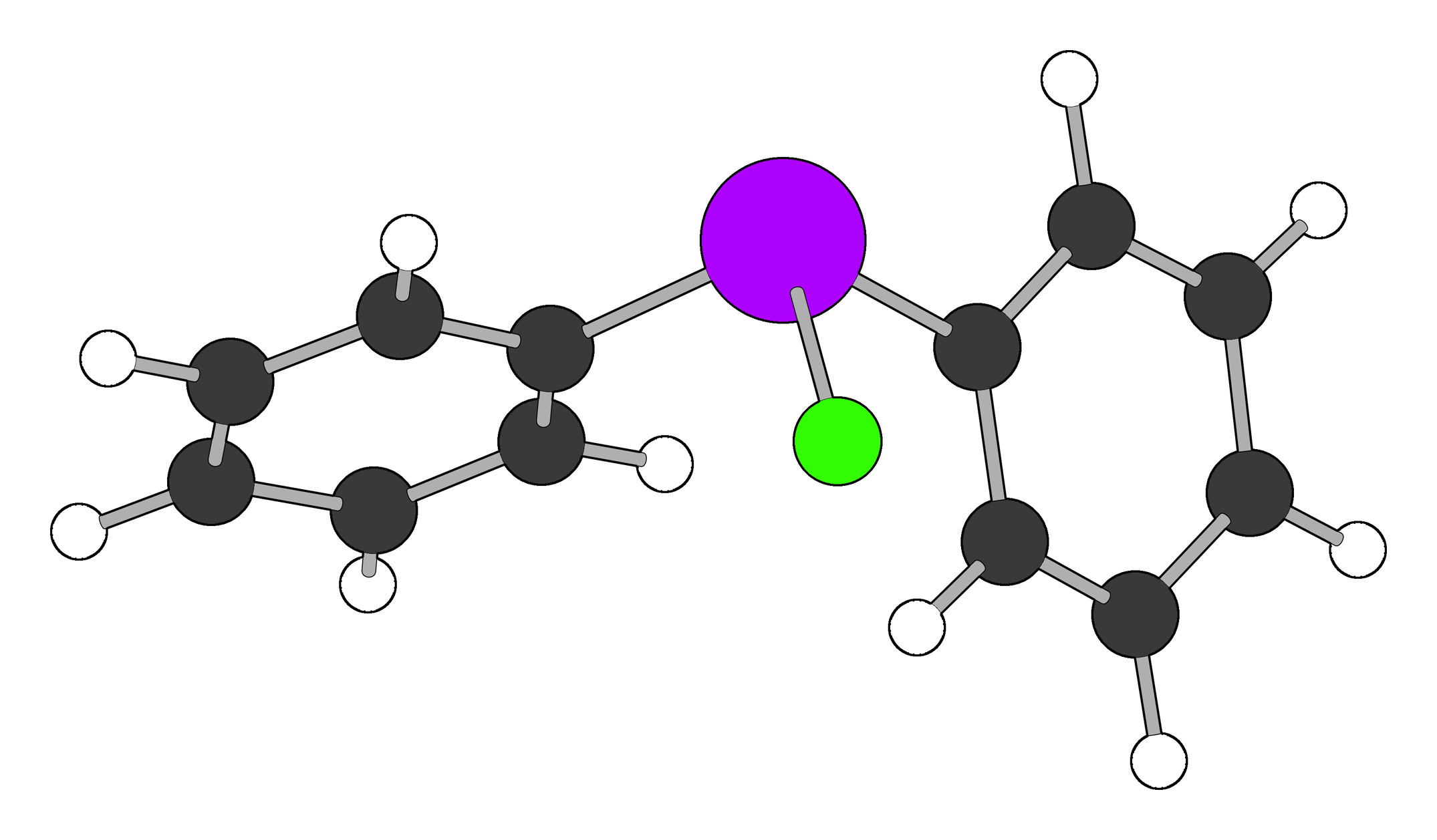

Names
- Preferred IUPAC name Diphenylarsinous chloride
- Other names diphenylchlorarsine, diphenyl arsine chloride, diphenylchloroarsenic, chlorodiphenylarsane, sneezing gas

Identifiers
CAS Number	712-48-1
3D model (JSmol)	Interactive image; Interactive image
Abbreviations	Ph_{2}AsCl
ChemSpider	12306
ECHA InfoCard	100.010.839
PubChem CID	12836
UNII	1H39V3559B
CompTox Dashboard (EPA)	DTXSID30858733
- InChI: InChI=1S/C12H10AsCl/c14-13(11-7-3-1-4-8-11)12-9-5-2-6-10-12/h1-10H Key: YHHKGKCOLGRKKB-UHFFFAOYSA-N; InChI=1/C12H10AsCl/c14-13(11-7-3-1-4-8-11)12-9-5-2-6-10-12/h1-10H Key: YHHKGKCOLGRKKB-UHFFFAOYAA
- SMILES: Cl[As](C1=CC=CC=C1)C2=CC=CC=C2; Cl[As](c1ccccc1)c2ccccc2

Properties
Chemical formula	C_{12}H_{10}AsCl
Molar mass	264.59 g mol^{−1}
Appearance	colorless crystalline solid
Density	1.55 g/cm^{3}
Melting point	42 °C (108 °F; 315 K)
Boiling point	307.2 °C (585.0 °F; 580.3 K)
Magnetic susceptibility (χ)	−145.5·10^{−6} cm^{3}/mol
- Except where otherwise noted, data are given for materials in their standard state (at 25 °C [77 °F], 100 kPa). verify (what is ?) Infobox references

Diphenylchloroarsine (DA) is the organoarsenic compound with the formula (C_{6}H_{5})_{2}AsCl. It is highly toxic and was once used in chemical warfare. It is also an intermediate in the preparation of other organoarsenic compounds. The molecule consists of a pyramidal As(III) center attached to two phenyl rings and one chloride. It was also known as sneezing oil during World War I by the Allies.

== Preparation and structure ==
It was first produced in 1878 by the German chemists August Michaelis (1847–1916) and Wilhelm La Coste (1854–1885). It is prepared by the reduction of diphenylarsinic acid with sulfur dioxide. An idealized equation is shown:

Ph_{2}AsO_{2}H + SO_{2} + HCl → Ph_{2}AsCl + H_{2}SO_{4}

The process adopted by Edgewood Arsenal, the "sodium process", for the production of DA for chemical warfare purposes, employed a reaction between chlorobenzene and arsenic trichloride in the presence of sodium.

The German process, used in the first war, applied at Hochstam-Main, used the Sandmeyer reaction between phenyldiazonium chloride and sodium arsenite. The acidified product was reduced and then neutralized. The salt was condensed again by the Sandmeyer reaction and reduced again, the final product was then acidified, resulting in DA.

DA is characterized by being the most difficult of the arsenic-based chemical warfare agents to synthesize. For example, in comparison, DM (Adamsite) requires only one manufacturing step and is applied in one-pot. PD, although manufactured in a very similar way to DA, is much more simpler to separate from the by-products.

The structure consists of pyramidal As centre. The As-Cl distance is 2.26 A and the Cl-As-C and C-As-C angles are 96 and 105°, respectively.

== Uses ==
It is a useful reagent for the preparation of other diphenylarsenic compounds, e.g. by reactions with Grignard reagents:

RMgBr + (C_{6}H_{5})_{2}AsCl → (C_{6}H_{5})_{2}AsR + MgBrCl
(R = alkyl, aryl)

=== Chemical warfare ===
Diphenylchlorarsine was used as a chemical weapon on the Western front during the trench warfare of World War I. It belongs to the class of chemicals classified as vomiting agents. Other such agents are diphenylcyanoarsine (DC) and diphenylaminechlorarsine (DM, Adamsite). Diphenylchlorarsine was sometimes believed to penetrate the gas masks of the time and to cause violent sneezing, forcing removal of the protecting device. The Germans called it Maskenbrecher (mask breaker), together with other substances with similar effects, such as Adamsite, diphenylarsincyanide, and diphenylaminarsincyanide. This gas did not actually penetrate masks any better than other gases.

DA (military code and acronym for diphenylchloroarsine) is a precursor to DC (diphenylcyanoarsine), generated by the reaction of an aqueous solution of sodium cyanide and DA (DC process, NaCN method), with cyanide being used in excess of 5%, for military purposes.

== Toxicity ==
Diphenylchlorarsine is known to cause sneezing, coughing, headache, salivation, and vomiting. China and Japan are negotiating remediation of stocks of a variety of organoarsenic weapons, including diphenylchlorarsine, dumped in northeastern China after Japan's numerous invasions of China.

== See also ==
- Blue Cross (chemical warfare)
