= Diphenylcyanoarsine =

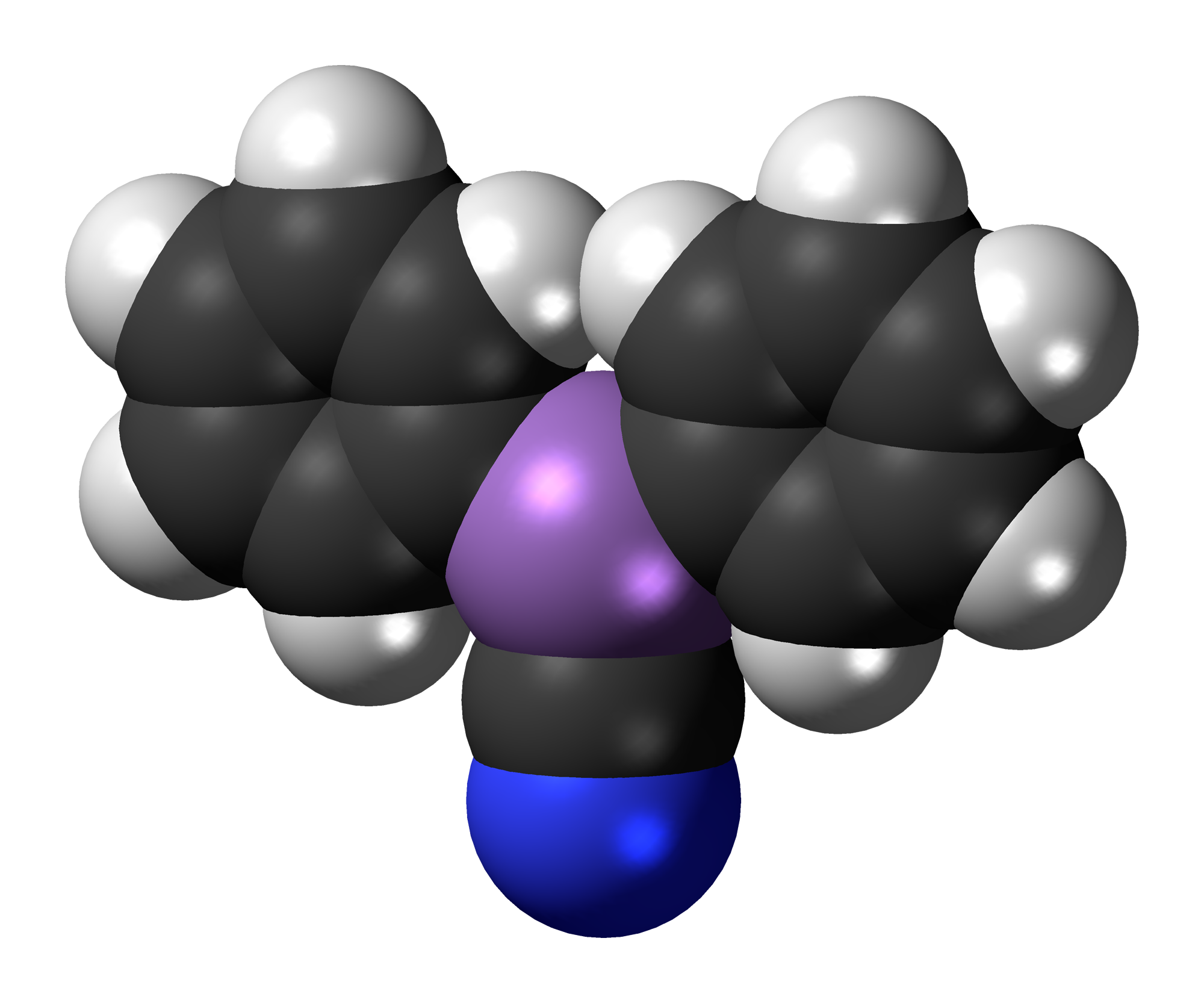

Names
- Preferred IUPAC name Diphenylarsinous cyanide
- Systematic IUPAC name Diphenylarsanecarbonitrile
- Other names Clark 2 Diphenylarsinecarbonitrile; Diphenylarsine cyanide Di(phenyl)arsanylformonitrile Diphenylcyanoarsine

Identifiers
CAS Number	23525-22-6
3D model (JSmol)	Interactive image; Interactive image
ChemSpider	58070
ECHA InfoCard	100.041.545
EC Number	245-716-6
MeSH	Clark+2
PubChem CID	64506
UNII	SF5K94TPOF
CompTox Dashboard (EPA)	DTXSID0075316
- InChI: InChI=1S/C13H10AsN/c15-11-14(12-7-3-1-4-8-12)13-9-5-2-6-10-13/h1-10H Key: BDHNJKLLVSRGDK-UHFFFAOYSA-N; InChI=1/C13H10AsN/c15-11-14(12-7-3-1-4-8-12)13-9-5-2-6-10-13/h1-10H
- SMILES: C1=CC=C(C=C1)[As](C#N)C2=CC=CC=C2; N#C[As](C1=CC=CC=C1)C1=CC=CC=C1

Properties
Chemical formula	C_{13}H_{10}AsN
Molar mass	255.002920742 g mol^{−1}
- Except where otherwise noted, data are given for materials in their standard state (at 25 °C [77 °F], 100 kPa). Infobox references

Diphenylcyanoarsine, also called Clark 2 (Chlor-Arsen-Kampfstoff 2, being the successor of Clark 1) by the Germans, was discovered in 1918 by Sturniolo and Bellinzoni and shortly thereafter used like the related diphenylchlorarsine "Clark 1" gas by the Germans for chemical warfare in the First World War. The substance causes nausea, vomiting, and headaches. It can subsequently lead to, e.g., pulmonary edema (fluid in the lungs).

== See also ==
- Cacodyl cyanide
- Diphenylchlorarsine
- Chemical weapons
