= Ethyldichloroarsine =

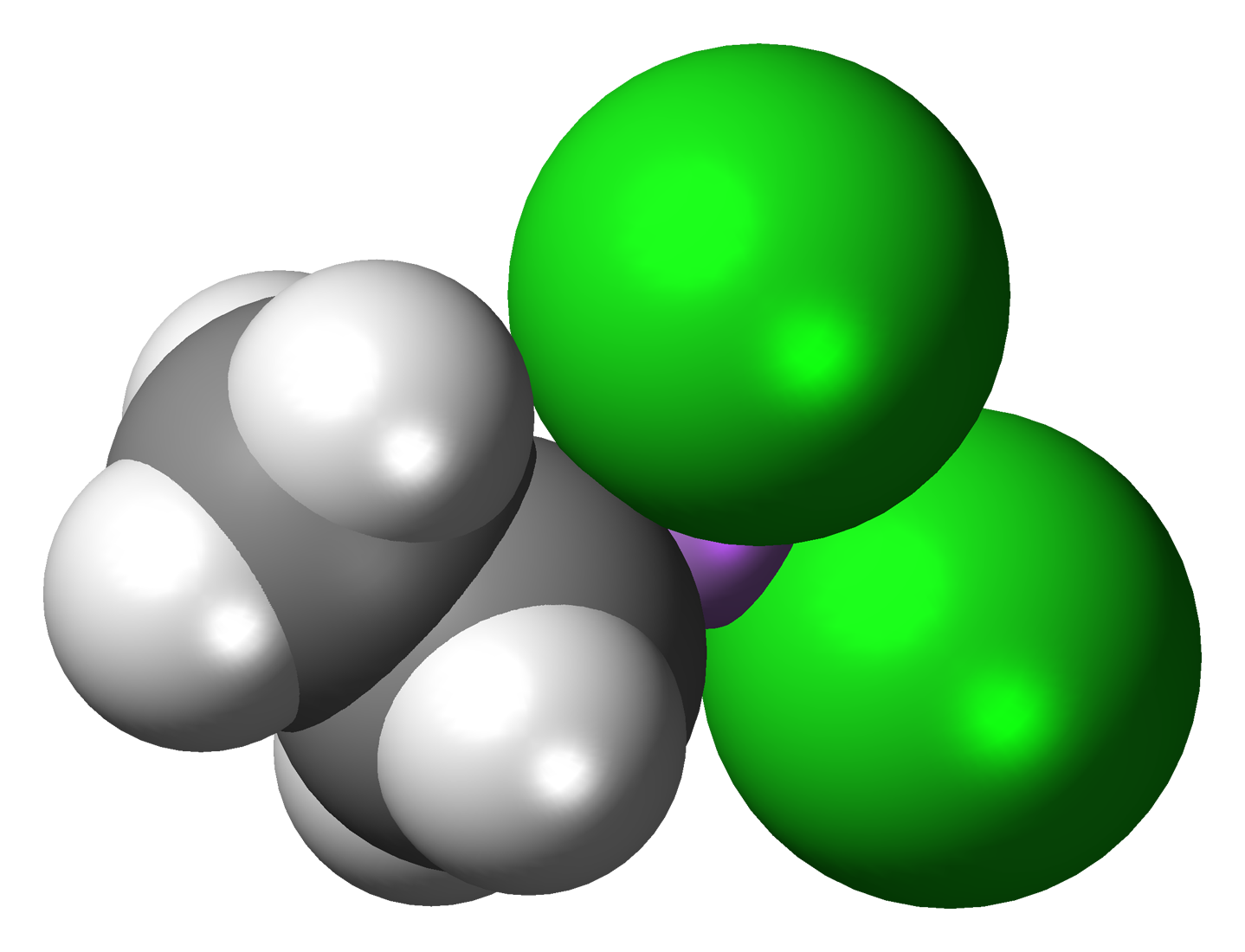

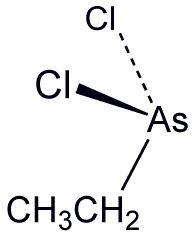

Names
- Preferred IUPAC name Ethylarsonous dichloride
- Other names ED; Dichloroethylarsane; DICK

Identifiers
CAS Number	598-14-1
3D model (JSmol)	Interactive image
ChemSpider	11219
ECHA InfoCard	100.009.019
EC Number	209-919-3
PubChem CID	11711
RTECS number	CH3500000
UNII	4Z7627500U
UN number	1892
CompTox Dashboard (EPA)	DTXSID6060505
- InChI: InChI=1S/C2H5AsCl2/c1-2-3(4)5/h2H2,1H3 Key: LQSFEOMOHFPNEB-UHFFFAOYSA-N
- SMILES: CC[As](Cl)Cl

Properties
Chemical formula	C_{2}H_{5}AsCl_{2}
Molar mass	174.8893 g/mol
Appearance	Colorless, mobile liquid
Density	1.742 @ 14 °C
Melting point	−65 °C (−85 °F; 208 K)
Boiling point	156 °C (313 °F; 429 K) (decomposes)
Solubility in water	Soluble in alcohol, benzene, ether, and water

Hazards
- Occupational safety and health (OHS/OSH)
Main hazards	Highly toxic, irritant
- Except where otherwise noted, data are given for materials in their standard state (at 25 °C [77 °F], 100 kPa). verify (what is ?) Infobox references

Ethyldichloroarsine, also known as ED, CY, and ethyl Dick, is an organoarsenic compound with the formula CH_{3}CH_{2}AsCl_{2}. This colourless volatile liquid is a highly toxic vesicant (blister agent) that was used during World War I in chemical warfare. The molecule is pyramidal with the Cl–As–Cl and C–As–Cl angles approaching 90° (see image). Ethyldichloroarsine has high chronic toxicity, similar to lewisite.
