= VE (nerve agent) =

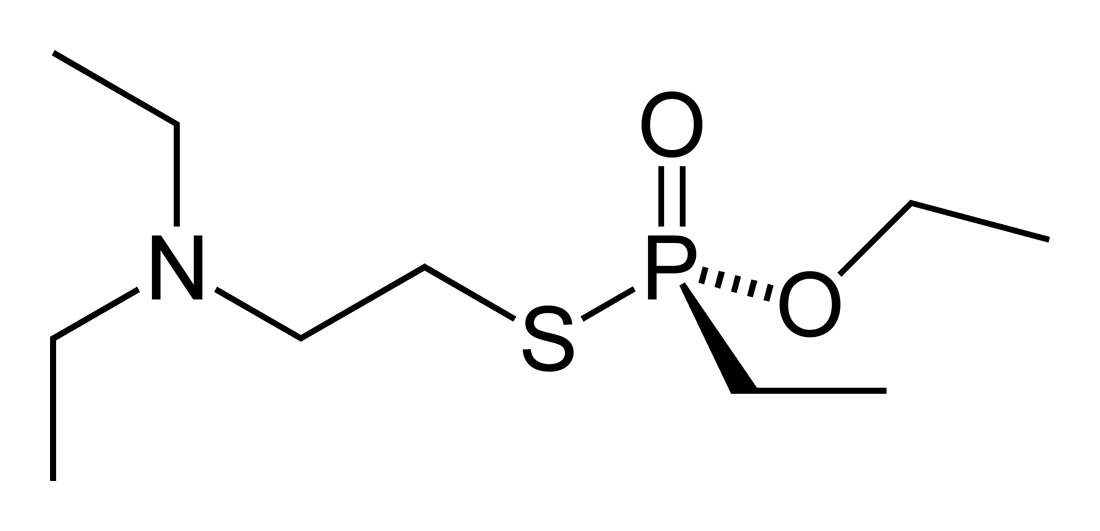
- Skeletal formula of VE

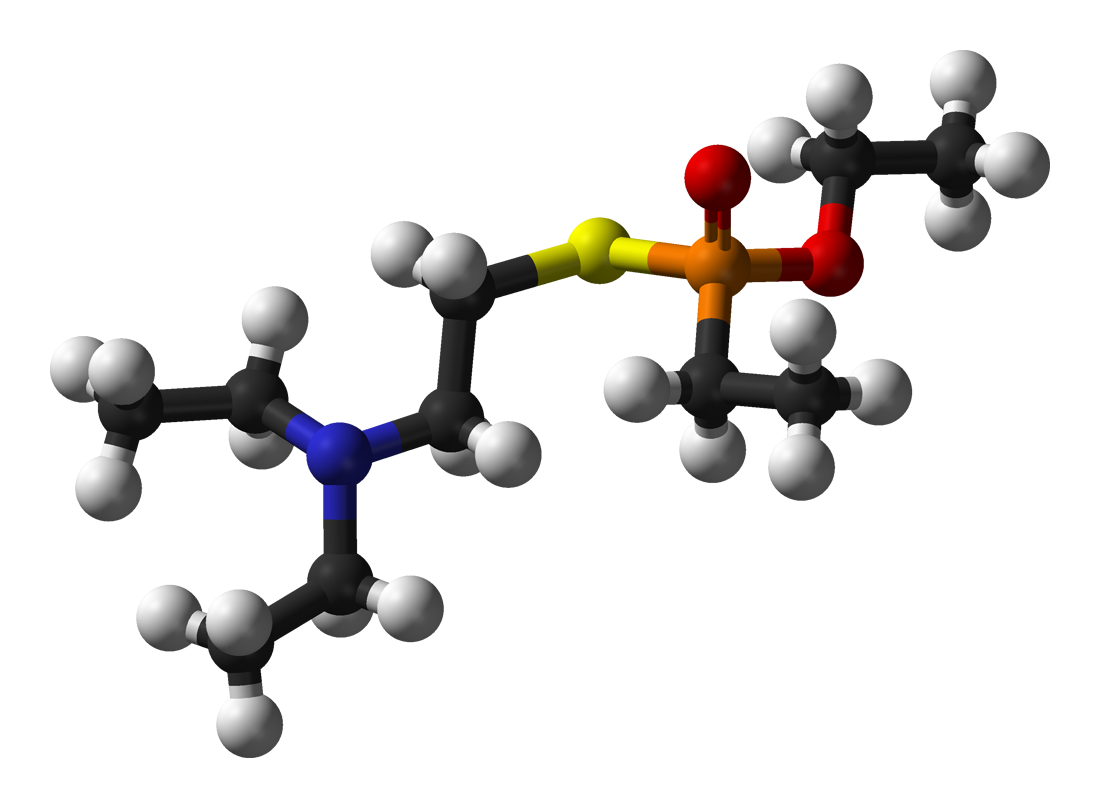
- Ball-and-stick model of VE

Names
- IUPAC name (S)-(ethyl {[2-(diethylamino)ethyl]sulfanyl}(ethyl)phosphinate)

Identifiers
CAS Number	21738-25-0
3D model (JSmol)	Interactive image
ChemSpider	59011
PubChem CID	65568
UNII	ZKS86A93Y9
CompTox Dashboard (EPA)	DTXSID00893813
- InChI: InChI=1S/C10H24NO2PS/c1-5-11(6-2)9-10-15-14(12,8-4)13-7-3/h5-10H2,1-4H3 Key: QXRUNSUMQBTCQS-UHFFFAOYSA-N; InChI=1/C10H24NO2PS/c1-5-11(6-2)9-10-15-14(12,8-4)13-7-3/h5-10H2,1-4H3 Key: QXRUNSUMQBTCQS-UHFFFAOYAY
- SMILES: O=P(OCC)(SCCN(CC)CC)CC

Properties
Chemical formula	C_{10}H_{24}NO_{2}PS
Molar mass	253.34 g·mol^{−1}
- Except where otherwise noted, data are given for materials in their standard state (at 25 °C [77 °F], 100 kPa). verify (what is ?) Infobox references

VE (S-(diethylamino)ethyl O-ethyl ethylphosphonothioate) is a "V-series" nerve agent closely related to the better-known VX nerve agent. It was first reported in 1958 as a pesticide.

Like most of the agents in the V-series (with the exception of VX), VE has not been extensively studied outside of military science.

It is commonly theorized that the so-called "second-generation" V series agents came from a Cold War era Russian chemical weapons development program. They may have been developed sometime between 1950 and 1990. They have similar lethal dose levels to VX (between 10–50 mg) and have similar symptoms and method of action to other nerve agents that act on cholinesterase, and treatment remains the same, but the window for effectively treating second generation V series seizures is shorter. In addition to the standard seizures, some of the second generation V series agents are known to cause comas.
