= CH3NO =

The molecular formula CH_{3}NO (molar mass: 45.04 g/mol, exact mass: 45.0215 u) may refer to:

- Formaldoxime
- Formamide, or methanamide
- Nitrosomethane
- Oxaziridine
