= 1,2-Dichloro-2-nitrosopropane =

Names
- Preferred IUPAC name 1,2-Dichloro-2-nitrosopropane
- Other names TL-359

Identifiers
CAS Number	14825-96-8
3D model (JSmol)	Interactive image
ChemSpider	77367
PubChem CID	85777
CompTox Dashboard (EPA)	DTXSID80933347
- InChI: InChI=1S/C3H5Cl2NO/c1-3(5,2-4)6-7/h2H2,1H3 Key: RWLUVRSRFMGCME-UHFFFAOYSA-N
- SMILES: CC(CCl)(N=O)Cl

Properties
Chemical formula	C_{3}H_{5}Cl_{2}NO
Molar mass	141.98 g·mol^{−1}
Appearance	Deep blue liquid
- Except where otherwise noted, data are given for materials in their standard state (at 25 °C [77 °F], 100 kPa). Infobox references

1,2-Dichloro-2-nitrosopropane is a chlorinated nitrosoalkane. It's a deep blue liquid with powerful lachrymatory effects.

== See also ==
- Chloropicrin
- Trifluoronitrosomethane
- Trichloronitrosomethane
