= Tetrachlorodinitroethane =

Names
- Preferred IUPAC name 1,1,2,2-Tetrachloro-1,2-dinitroethane
- Other names Tetrachlordinitroethane

Identifiers
| CAS Number | 67226-85-1 |
| 3D model (JSmol) | Interactive image |
| ChemSpider | 87805 |
| PubChem CID | 97280 |
| CompTox Dashboard (EPA) | DTXSID60217536 |
- InChI: InChI=1S/C2Cl4N2O4/c3-1(4,7(9)10)2(5,6)8(11)12 Key: VDUMCAJVLOJOCK-UHFFFAOYSA-N
- SMILES: C(C([N+](=O)[O-])(Cl)Cl)([N+](=O)[O-])(Cl)Cl

Properties
| Chemical formula | C_{2}Cl_{4}N_{2}O_{4} |
| Molar mass | 257.83 g·mol^{−1} |
- Except where otherwise noted, data are given for materials in their standard state (at 25 °C [77 °F], 100 kPa). Infobox references

Tetrachlorodinitroethane is a chlorinated nitroalkane produced by nitration of tetrachloroethylene with dinitrogen tetroxide or fuming nitric acid. It is a powerful lachrymatory agent and pulmonary agent that is six times more toxic than chloropicrin. Tetrachlorodinitroethane may be used as a fumigant.

Tetrachlorodinitroethane was discovered by Hermann Kolbe in 1869 by reacting tetrachloroethylene and dinitrogen tetroxide.

== See also ==
- Chloropicrin
- Trifluoronitrosomethane
- Trichloronitrosomethane
