= Chemical burn =

Medical condition

- Other names: Acid burn
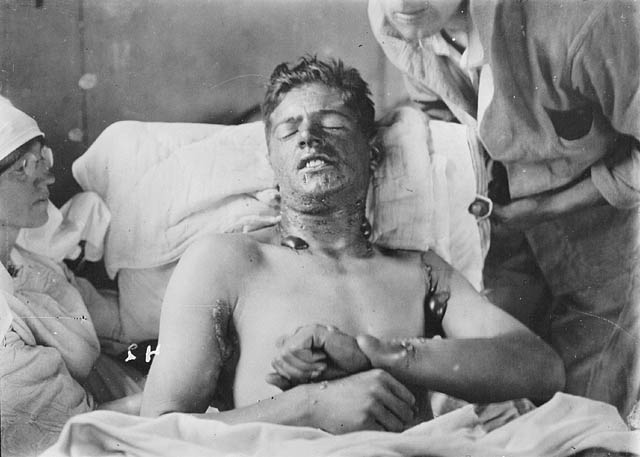
- Chemical burns caused by exposure to mustard gas during the First World War
- Specialty: Emergency medicine, plastic surgery, dermatology
- Symptoms: itching, bleaching or darkening of skin, burning sensations, trouble breathing, coughing blood or tissue necrosis
- Complications: Depends on the severity
- Causes: most common include: sulfuric acid, hydrochloric acid, sodium hydroxide, lime, silver nitrate, and greater than 5% hydrogen peroxide solutions.
- Treatment: Depends on the chemicals being exposed

A chemical burn occurs when living tissue is exposed to a corrosive substance (such as a strong acid, base or oxidizer) or a cytotoxic agent (such as mustard gas, lewisite or arsine). Chemical burns follow standard burn classification and may cause extensive tissue damage. The main types of irritant and/or corrosive products are: acids, bases, oxidizers and reducing agents, solvents, and alkylants. Additionally, chemical burns can be caused by biological toxins (such as cantharidin) and by some types of cytotoxic chemical weapons, e.g., vesicants such as mustard gas and Lewisite, or urticants such as phosgene oxime.

Chemical burns may:

- need no source of heat
- occur immediately on contact
- not be immediately evident or noticeable
- be extremely painful
- diffuse into tissue and damage cellular structures under skin without immediately apparent damage to skin surface

Exposure to a toxic substance that is insufficient to cause a chemical burn can still be very serious, and the lack of a noticeable effect from a chemical exposure is not an indication of safety, particularly in the case of chronic exposure.

== Presentation ==
The exact symptoms of a chemical burn depend on the chemical involved. Symptoms include itching, bleaching or darkening of skin, burning sensations, trouble breathing, coughing blood and/or tissue necrosis. Common sources of chemical burns include sulfuric acid (H_{2}SO_{4}), hydrochloric acid (HCl), sodium hydroxide (NaOH), lime (CaO), silver nitrate (AgNO_{3}), and hydrogen peroxide (H_{2}O_{2}). Effects depend on the substance; hydrogen peroxide removes a bleached layer of skin, while nitric acid causes a characteristic color change to yellow in the skin, and silver nitrate produces noticeable black stains. Chemical burns may occur through direct contact on body surfaces, including skin and eyes, via inhalation, and/or by ingestion. Substances that diffuse efficiently in human tissue, e.g., hydrofluoric acid, sulfur mustard, and dimethyl sulfate, may not react immediately, but instead produce the burns and inflammation hours after the contact. Chemical fabrication, mining, medicine, and related professional fields are examples of occupations where chemical burns may occur. Hydrofluoric acid leaches into the bloodstream, reacts with calcium and magnesium, and the resulting salts can cause cardiac arrest after eating through skin.

== Prevention ==
In Belgium, the Conseil Supérieur de la Santé gives a scientific advisory report on public health policy. The Superior Health Council of Belgium provides an overview of products that are authorized in Belgium for consumer use and that contain caustic substances, as well as of the risks linked to exposure to these products. This report aims at suggesting protection measures for the consumers, and formulates recommendations that apply to the different stages of the chain, which begins with the formulation of the product, followed by its regulation, marketing, application, post-application and ends with its monitoring.

== Gallery ==
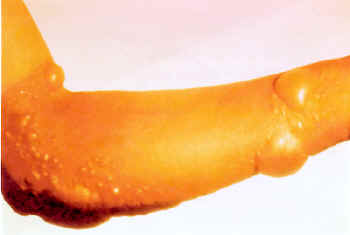
Chemical burns to the arm, caused by a blister agent e.g. mustard gas

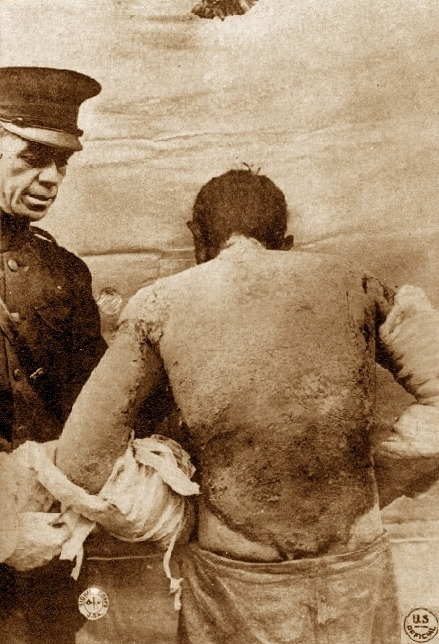
Soldier with severe mustard gas burns to back and arms, circa 1918. These burns are severe enough to be life-threatening.

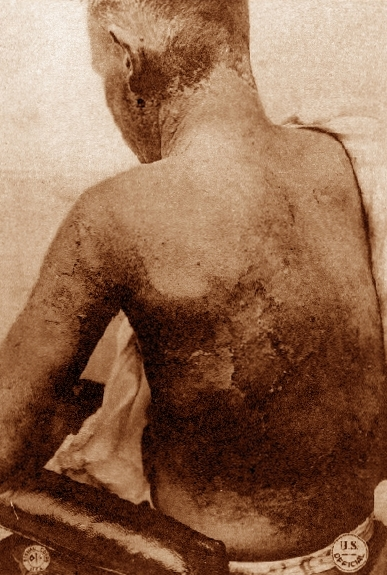
Soldier with mustard gas burns, circa 1918

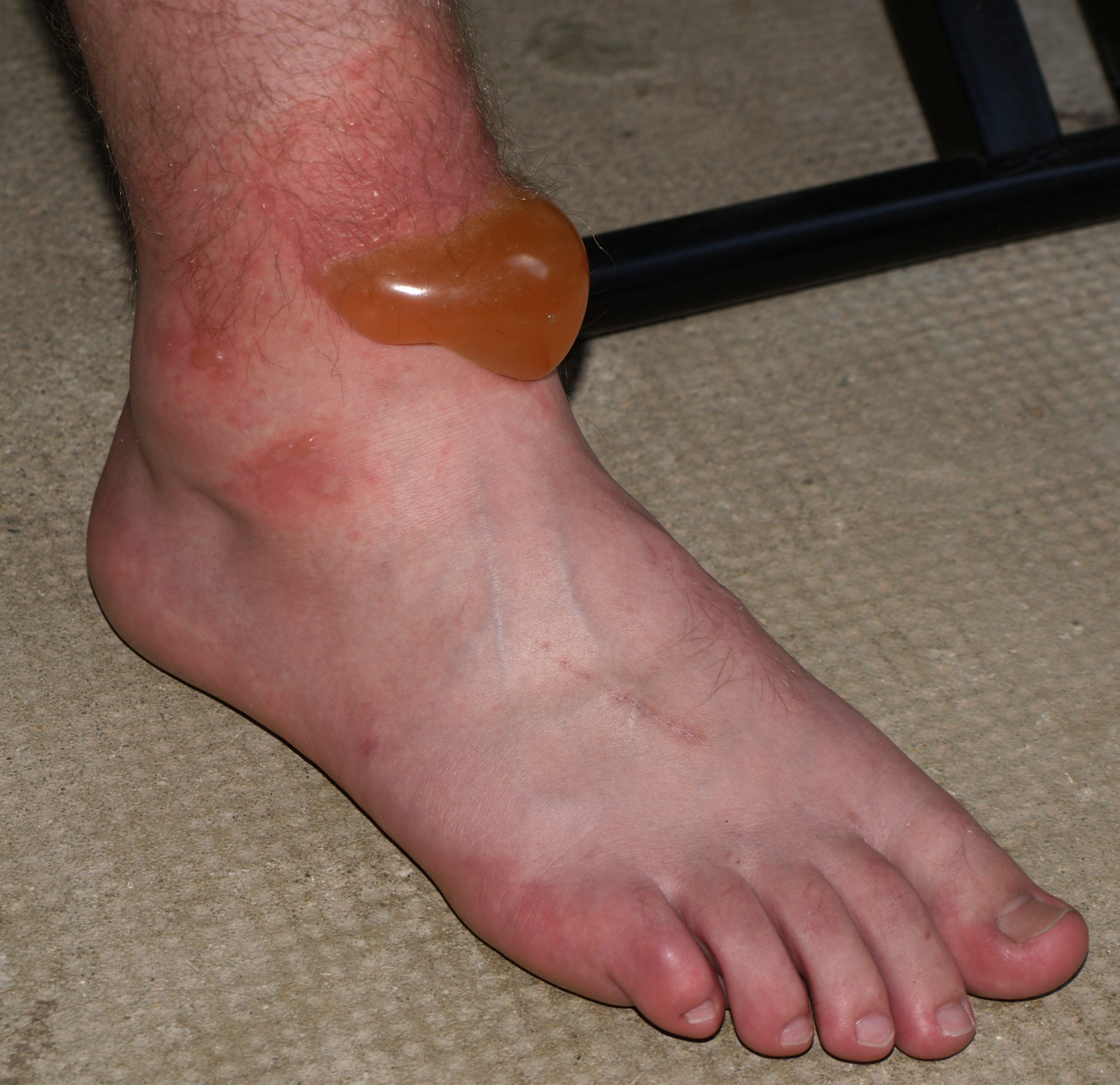
Severe skin burns with blisters are very rare, but possible.

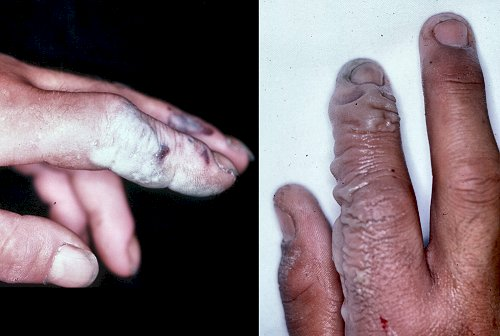
Hydrofluoric acid (HF) burns, which were not evident until a day after exposure

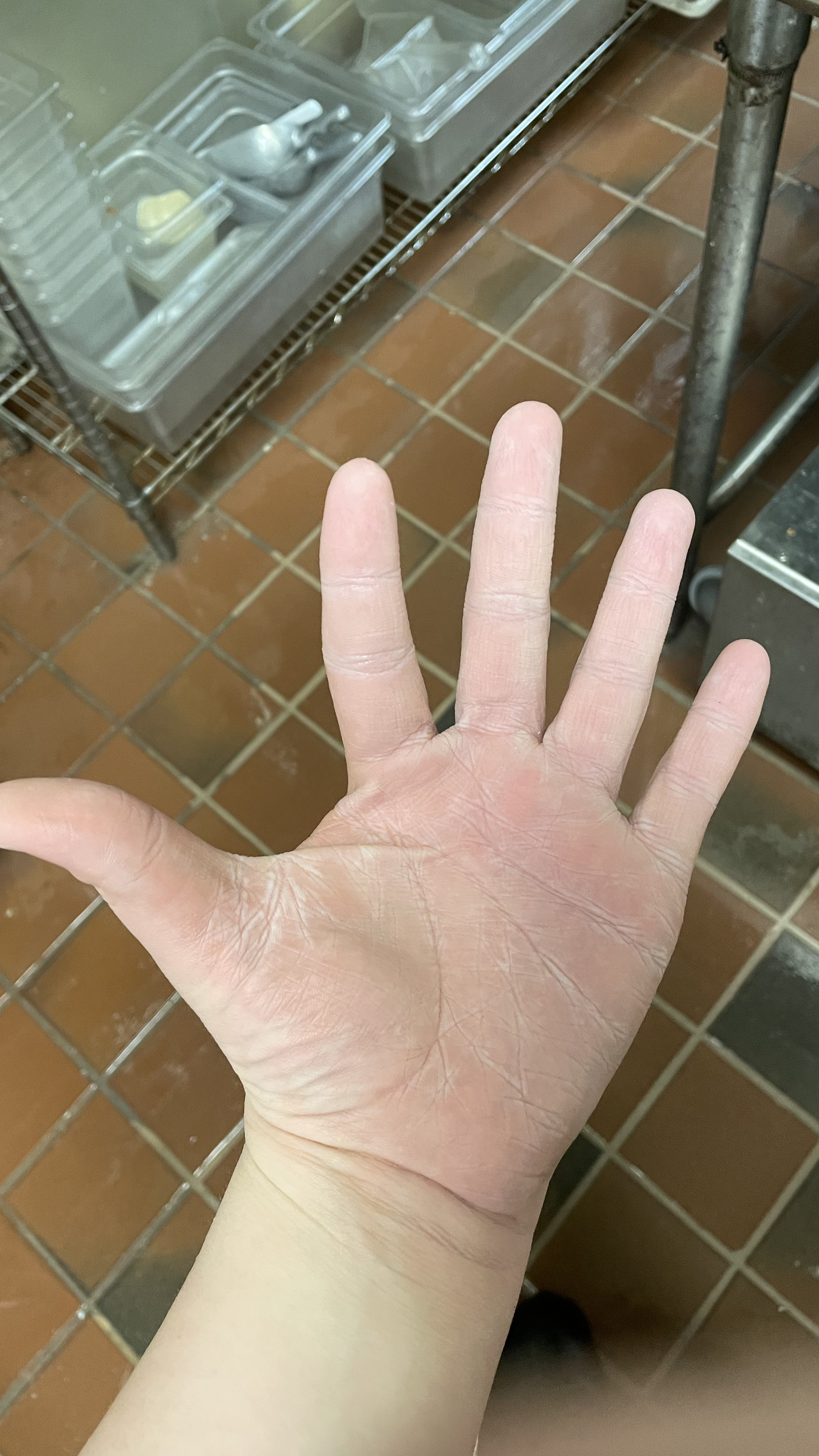
A hand that has received minor chemical burns from a commercial grade dishwasher. Said dishwasher uses caustic chemicals such as high concentration chlorine.

== See also ==
- Acid throwing
