= Nitrosomethane =

Names
- IUPAC name Nitrosomethane

Identifiers
CAS Number	865-40-7
3D model (JSmol)	Interactive image
PubChem CID	70075
CompTox Dashboard (EPA)	DTXSID60235598
- SMILES: CN=O

Properties
Chemical formula	CH_{3}NO
Molar mass	45.041 g·mol^{−1}
Boiling point	−18.3 °C (−0.9 °F; 254.8 K)
- Except where otherwise noted, data are given for materials in their standard state (at 25 °C [77 °F], 100 kPa). Infobox references

Nitrosomethane is an organic chemical compound with the chemical formula CH_{3}NO.

== Chemical properties ==
It is an organic chemical compound made up from a methyl group (-CH_{3}) and nitroso group (-NO). At room temperature, it is a flammable gas that boils at -18.3 °C (±9.0 °C).

== Synthesis ==
Same as trifluoronitrosomethane (a rather rare example of a blue gas), it can be synthesized by the reaction of nitric oxide with methyl iodide with a catalytic amount of mercury metal:

2 CH_{3}I + 2 NO → 2 CH_{3}NO + I_{2}

== Related compounds ==
Nitrosomethane is related to a few other compounds, such as:

- Trifluoronitrosomethane
- Nitromethane
- Formaldoxime (isomer and tautomer)
