= Thioformamide =

Identifiers
CAS Number	115-08-2
3D model (JSmol)	Interactive image
ChemSpider	2275727
ECHA InfoCard	100.003.694
EC Number	204-063-7
PubChem CID	3005587
UNII	G525TLN0E7
CompTox Dashboard (EPA)	DTXSID00150918
- InChI: InChI=1S/CH3NS/c2-1-3/h1H,(H2,2,3) Key: CYEBJEDOHLIWNP-UHFFFAOYSA-N
- SMILES: C(=S)N

Properties
Chemical formula	CH_{3}NS
Molar mass	61.10 g·mol^{−1}
Appearance	white solid
Density	1.261 g/cm^{3}
- Except where otherwise noted, data are given for materials in their standard state (at 25 °C [77 °F], 100 kPa). Infobox references

Thioformamide is the organosulfur compound with the formula HC(S)NH_{2}. Although lightly studied, it is of interest as the parent thioamide. The structure has been confirmed by X-ray crystallography, which reveals the expected planar structure with a C=S bond (167 picometer).

The compound is prepared by treating formamide with phosphorus pentasulfide.

As a component of the cyanosulfidic protometabolism hypothesis, thioformamide and related compounds have been implicated as prebiotic precursors to peptides.
