= Nettle agent =

Type of chemical warfare agent

Nettle agents (named after stinging nettles) or urticants are a variety of chemical warfare agents that produce corrosive skin and tissue injury upon contact, resulting in erythema, urticaria, intense itching, and a hive-like rash.

Most nettle agents, such as the best known and studied nettle agent, phosgene oxime, are often grouped with the vesicant (blister agent) chemical agents. However, because nettle agents do not cause blisters, they are not true vesicants.
