= Phosgene oxime =

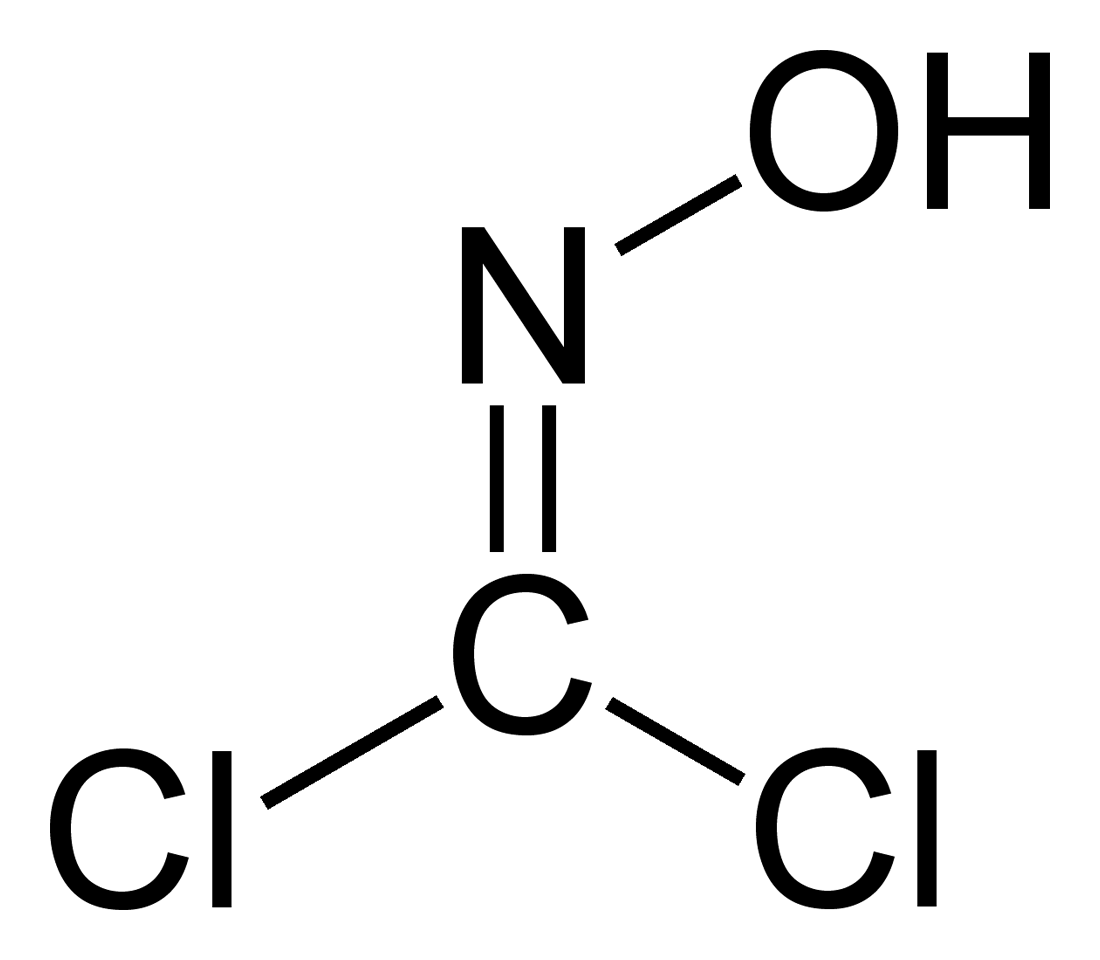
- Full structural formula

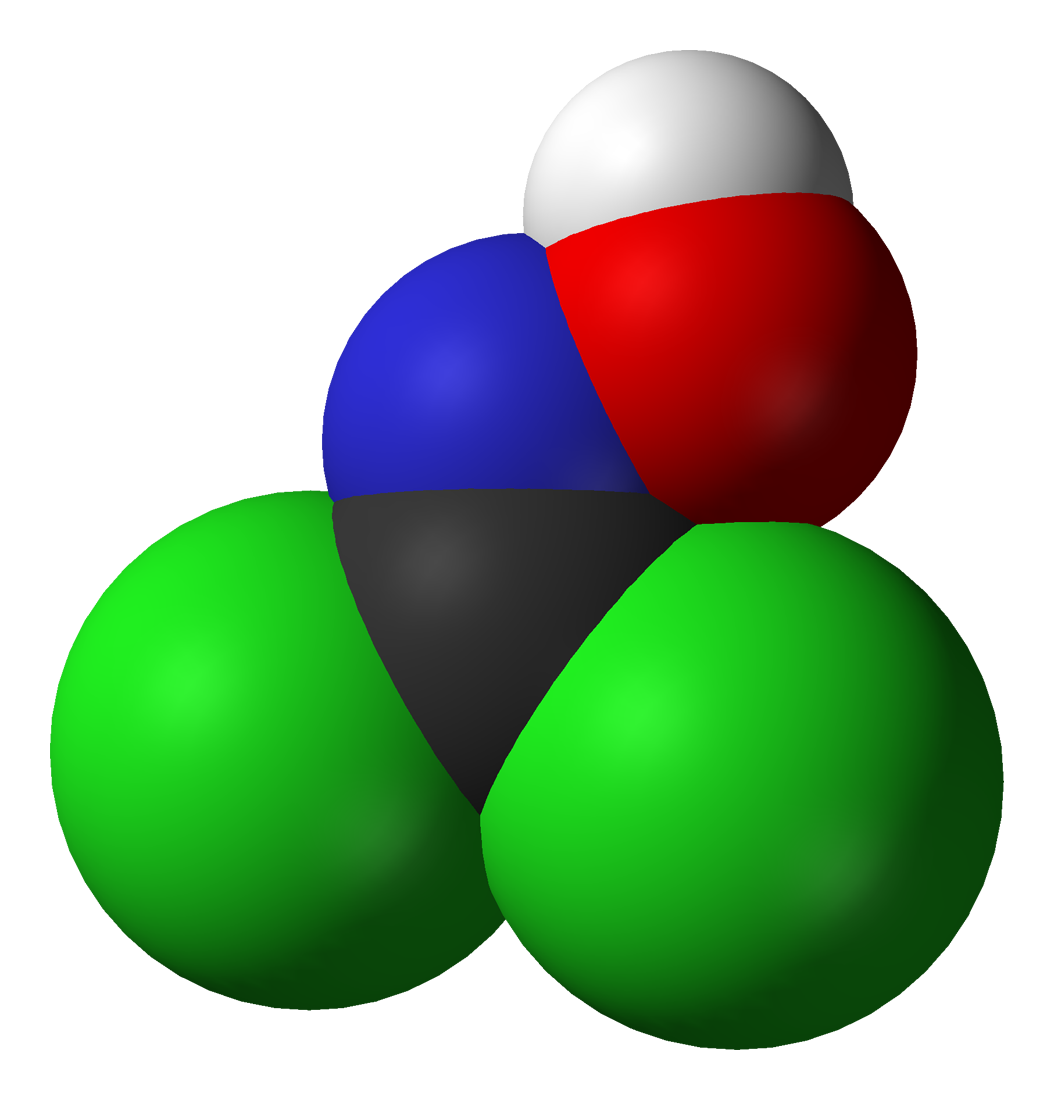
- Space-filling model Carbon, C Hydrogen, H Oxygen, O Nitrogen, N Chlorine, Cl

Names
- Preferred IUPAC name 1,1-Dichloro-N-hydroxymethanimine
- Other names: CX; Dichloroformaldehyde oxime; Dichloroformaldoxime; Dichloroformoxime; Hydroxycarbonimidic dichloride

Identifiers
CAS Number	1794-86-1
3D model (JSmol)	Interactive image
ChemSpider	59024
PubChem CID	65582
UNII	G45S3149SQ
CompTox Dashboard (EPA)	DTXSID9075292
- InChI: InChI=1S/CHCl2NO/c2-1(3)4-5/h5H Key: JIRJHEXNDQBKRZ-UHFFFAOYSA-N; InChI=1/CHCl2NO/c2-1(3)4-5/h5H Key: JIRJHEXNDQBKRZ-UHFFFAOYAP
- SMILES: Cl/C(Cl)=N\O

Properties
Chemical formula	Cl_{2}CNOH
Molar mass	113.93 g·mol^{−1}
Appearance	colorless or white solid
Odor	Strong, disagreeable and irritating
Melting point	35 to 40 °C (95 to 104 °F; 308 to 313 K)
Boiling point	128 °C (262 °F; 401 K)
Solubility in water	70%

Hazards
- Occupational safety and health (OHS/OSH)
Main hazards	Highly toxic

Related compounds
Related compounds	Formaldoxime; Phosgene; Oxime
- Except where otherwise noted, data are given for materials in their standard state (at 25 °C [77 °F], 100 kPa). verify (what is ?) Infobox references

Phosgene oxime, or CX, is an organic compound with the formula Cl_{2}C=N−OH. It is a potent chemical weapon, specifically a nettle agent. The compound itself is a colorless solid, but impure samples are often yellowish liquids. It has a strong, disagreeable and irritating odor. It is used as a reagent in organic chemistry.

== Preparation and reactions ==
Phosgene oxime can be prepared by reduction of chloropicrin using a combination of tin metal and hydrochloric acid as the source of the active hydrogen reducing agent:

Cl_{3}CNO_{2} + 4 [H] → Cl_{2}C=N−OH + HCl + H_{2}O

The observation of a transient violet color in the reaction suggests intermediate formation of trichloronitrosomethane (Cl_{3}CNO). Early preparations, using stannous chloride as the reductant, also started with chloropicrin.

The compound is electrophilic and thus sensitive to nucleophiles, including bases, which destroy it:

Cl_{2}CNOH + 2 NaOH → CO_{2} + NH_{2}OH + 2 NaCl + H_{2}O

Phosgene oxime has been used to prepare heterocycles that contain N-O bonds, such as isoxazoles.

Dehydrohalogenation upon contact with mercuric oxide generates chloroformonitrile oxide, a reactive nitrile oxide:

Cl_{2}CNOH → Cl−C≡N^{+}−O^{−} + HCl

== Toxicity ==
Phosgene oxime is classified as a vesicant even though it does not produce blisters. It is toxic by inhalation, ingestion, or skin contact. The effects of the poisoning occur almost immediately. No antidote for phosgene oxime poisoning is known. Generally, any treatment is supportive. Typical physical symptoms of CX exposure are as follows:

- Skin: Blanching surrounded by an erythematous ring can be observed within 30 seconds of exposure. A wheal develops on exposed skin within 30 minutes. The original blanched area acquires a brown pigmentation by 24 hours. An eschar forms in the pigmented area by 1 week and sloughs after approximately 3 weeks. Initially, the effects of CX can easily be misidentified as mustard gas exposure. However, the onset of skin irritation resulting from CX exposure is a great deal faster than mustard gas, which typically takes several hours or more to cause skin irritation.
- Eyes: Eye examination typically demonstrates conjunctivitis, lacrimation, lid edema, and blepharospasm after even minute exposures. More severe exposures can result in keratitis, iritis, corneal perforation, and blindness.
- Respiratory: Irritation of the mucous membranes may be observed on examination of the oropharynx and nose. Evidence of pulmonary edema, including rales and wheezes, may be noted on auscultation. Pulmonary thromboses are prominent features of severe CX exposure.
- Gastrointestinal: Some animal data suggest that CX may cause hemorrhagic inflammatory changes in the GI tract.
