= Chloropicrin =

Trichloro-nitro-methane

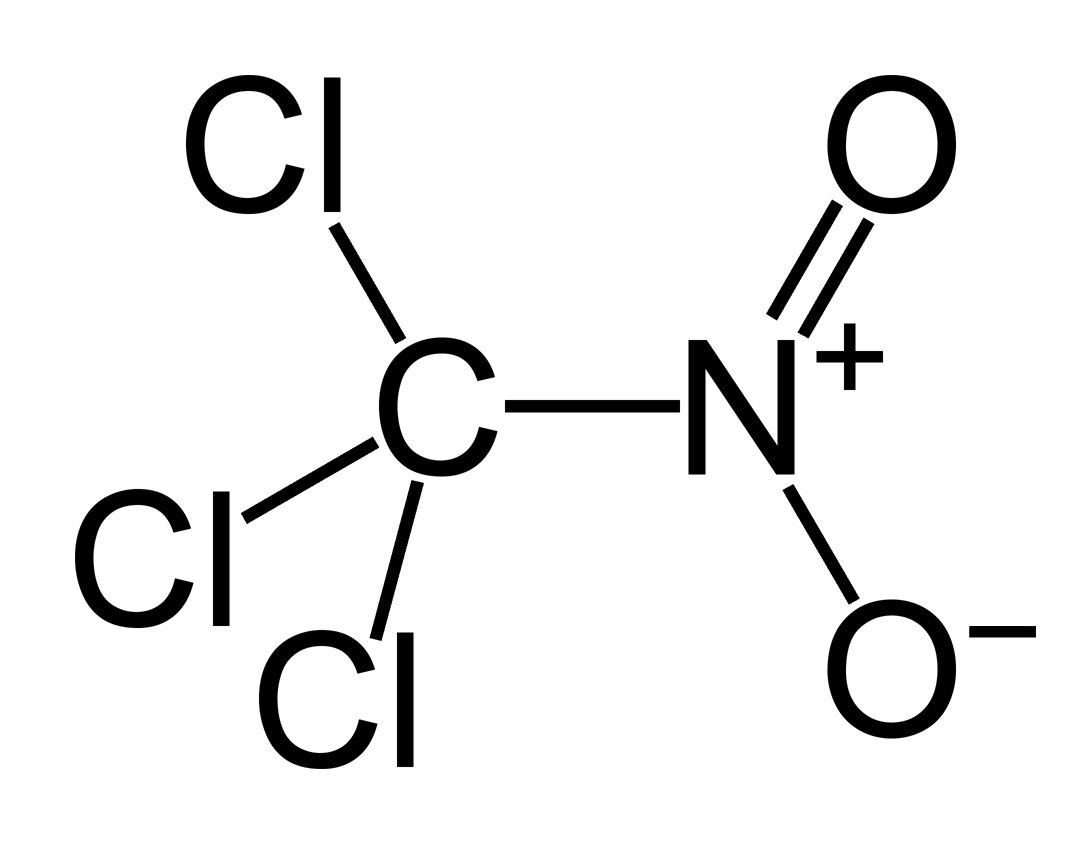

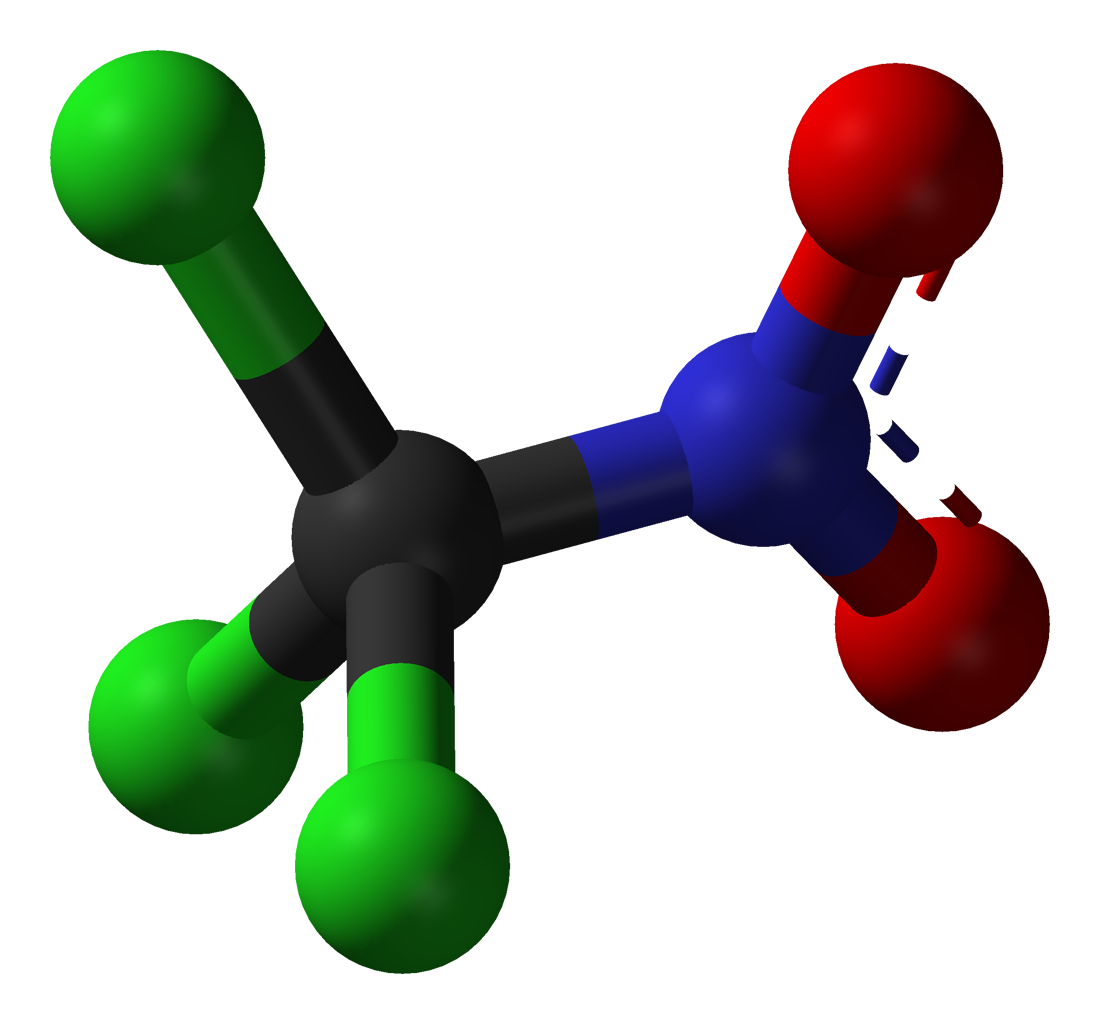

Names
- IUPAC name Trichloro(nitro)methane
- Other names: Nitrochloroform; Nitrotrichloromethane; PS; Tri-clor; Trichloronitromethane

Identifiers
CAS Number	76-06-2
3D model (JSmol)	Interactive image
Beilstein Reference	1756135
ChEBI	CHEBI:39285
ChEMBL	ChEMBL1327143
ChemSpider	13861343
ECHA InfoCard	100.000.847
EC Number	200-930-9
Gmelin Reference	240197
IUPHAR/BPS	6292
KEGG	C18445
PubChem CID	6423
RTECS number	PB6300000
UNII	I4JTX7Z7U2
UN number	1580
CompTox Dashboard (EPA)	DTXSID0020315
- InChI: InChI=1S/CCl3NO2/c2-1(3,4)5(6)7 Key: LFHISGNCFUNFFM-UHFFFAOYSA-N; InChI=1/CCl3NO2/c2-1(3,4)5(6)7 Key: LFHISGNCFUNFFM-UHFFFAOYAJ
- SMILES: ClC(Cl)(Cl)[N+]([O-])=O

Properties
Chemical formula	CCl_{3}NO_{2}
Molar mass	164.375 g/mol
Appearance	colorless liquid
Odor	irritating
Density	1.692 g/ml
Melting point	−69 °C (−92 °F; 204 K)
Boiling point	112 °C (234 °F; 385 K) (decomposes)
Solubility in water	0.2%
Vapor pressure	18 mmHg (20°C)
Magnetic susceptibility (χ)	−75.3·10^{−6} cm^{3}/mol

Hazards
- Occupational safety and health (OHS/OSH)
Main hazards	Extremely toxic and irritating to skin, eyes, and lungs.
- GHS labelling
Pictograms	(GHS05: Corrosive) (GHS06: Toxic) (GHS08: Health hazard) (GHS09: Environmental hazard)
Signal word	Danger
Hazard statements	H301, H314, H330, H370, H372, H410
Precautionary statements	P260, P264, P270, P271, P273, P280, P284, P301+P310, P301+P330+P331, P303+P361+P353, P304+P340, P305+P351+P338, P307+P311, P310, P314, P320, P321, P330, P363, P391, P403+P233, P405, P501
NFPA 704 (fire diamond)	4 0 3
- Lethal dose or concentration (LD, LC)
LC_{50} (median concentration)	9.7 ppm (mouse, 4 hr); 117 ppm (rat, 20 min); 14.4 ppm (rat, 4 hr)
LC_{Lo} (lowest published)	293 ppm (human, 10 min); 340 ppm (mouse, 1 min); 117 ppm (cat, 20 min)
- NIOSH (US health exposure limits)
PEL (Permissible)	TWA 0.1 ppm (0.7 mg/m^{3})
REL (Recommended)	TWA 0.1 ppm (0.7 mg/m^{3})
IDLH (Immediate danger)	2 ppm
- Except where otherwise noted, data are given for materials in their standard state (at 25 °C [77 °F], 100 kPa). verify (what is ?) Infobox references

Chloropicrin, also known as PS (from Port Sunlight) and nitrochloroform, is a chemical compound currently used as a broad-spectrum antimicrobial, fungicide, herbicide, insecticide, and nematicide. It was used as a poison gas in World War I. Its chemical structural formula is Cl_{3}C−NO_{2}.

== Synthesis ==
Chloropicrin was discovered in 1848 by Scottish chemist John Stenhouse. He prepared it by the reaction of sodium hypochlorite with picric acid:

HOC_{6}H_{2}(NO_{2})_{3} + 11 NaOCl → 3 Cl_{3}CNO_{2} + 3 Na_{2}CO_{3} + 3 NaOH + 2 NaCl

Because of the precursor used, Stenhouse named the compound chloropicrin, although the two compounds are structurally dissimilar.

Today, chloropicrin is manufactured by the reaction of nitromethane with sodium hypochlorite:

H_{3}CNO_{2} + 3 NaOCl → Cl_{3}CNO_{2} + 3 NaOH

Reaction of chloroform and nitric acid also yields chloropicrin:

Cl_{3}CH + HONO_{2} → Cl_{3}CNO_{2} + H_{2}O

== Properties ==
Chloropicrin's chemical formula is CCl_{3}NO_{2} and its molecular weight is 164.38 grams/mol. Pure chloropicrin is a colorless liquid, with a boiling point of 112 °C. Chloropicrin is sparingly soluble in water with solubility of 2 g/L at 25 °C. It is volatile, with a vapor pressure of 23.2 millimeters of mercury (mmHg) at 25 °C; the corresponding Henry's law constant is 0.00251 atmosphere-cubic meter per mole. The octanol-water partition coefficient (K_{ow}) of chloropicrin is estimated to be 269. Its soil adsorption coefficient (K_{oc}; normalized to soil organic matter content) is 25 cm^{3}/g.

== Uses ==
=== Poison ===
Chloropicrin was manufactured for use as poison gas in World War I. In World War I, German forces used concentrated chloropicrin against Allied forces as a tear gas. While not as lethal as other chemical weapons, it induced vomiting and forced Allied soldiers to remove their masks to vomit, exposing them to more toxic gases used as weapons during the war. It was also used by the Imperial Russian Army in hand grenades as 50% solution in sulfuryl chloride.

In February 2024, Ukrainian General Oleksandr Tarnavskyi accused the Russian Armed Forces of using chloropicrin munitions. In May 2024, the United States Department of State also alleged use of chloropicrin by Russian forces in Ukraine, and imposed sanctions against Russian individuals and entities as a response. Dutch and German intelligence agencies found chloropicrin use to be "commonplace" by July 2025.

=== Agriculture ===
In agriculture, chloropicrin is injected into soil prior to planting a crop to fumigate soil. Chloropicrin affects a broad spectrum of fungi, microbes and insects. It is commonly used as a stand-alone treatment or in combination / co-formulation with methyl bromide and 1,3-dichloropropene. Chloropicrin is used as an indicator and repellent when fumigating residences for insects with sulfuryl fluoride which is an odorless gas. Chloropicrin's mode of action is unknown (IRAC MoA 8B). Chloropicrin may stimulate weed germination, which can be useful when quickly followed by a more effective herbicide.

Chloropicrin was first registered in 1975 in the US. After a 2008 re-approval, the EPA stated that chloropicrin "means more fresh fruits and vegetables can be cheaply produced domestically year-round because several severe pest problems can be efficiently controlled." To ensure chloropicrin is used safely, the EPA requires a strict set of protections for handlers, workers, and persons living and working in and around farmland during treatments. EPA protections were increased in both 2011 and 2012, reducing fumigant exposures and significantly improving safety. Protections include the training of certified applicators supervising pesticide application, the use of buffer zones, posting before and during pesticide application, fumigant management plans, and compliance assistance and assurance measures.

Used as a preplant soil treatment measure, chloropicrin suppresses soilborne pathogenic fungi and some nematodes and insects. According to chloropicrin manufacturers, with a half-life of hours to days, it is completely digested by soil organisms before the crop is planted, making it safe and efficient. Contrary to popular belief, chloropicrin does not sterilize soil and does not deplete the ozone layer, as the compound is destroyed by sunlight. Additionally, chloropicrin has never been found in groundwater, due to its low solubility.

==== California ====
In California, experience with acute effects of chloropicrin when used as a soil fumigant for strawberries and other crops led to the release of regulations in January 2015 creating buffer zones and other precautions to minimize exposure to farm workers, neighbors, and passersby.

== Safety ==
At a national level, chloropicrin is regulated in the United States by the United States Environmental Protection Agency as a restricted use pesticide. Because of its toxicity, distribution and use of chloropicrin is available only to licensed professionals and specially certified growers who are trained in its proper and safe use. In the US, occupational exposure limits have been set at 0.1 ppm over an eight-hour time-weighted average.

=== High concentrations ===
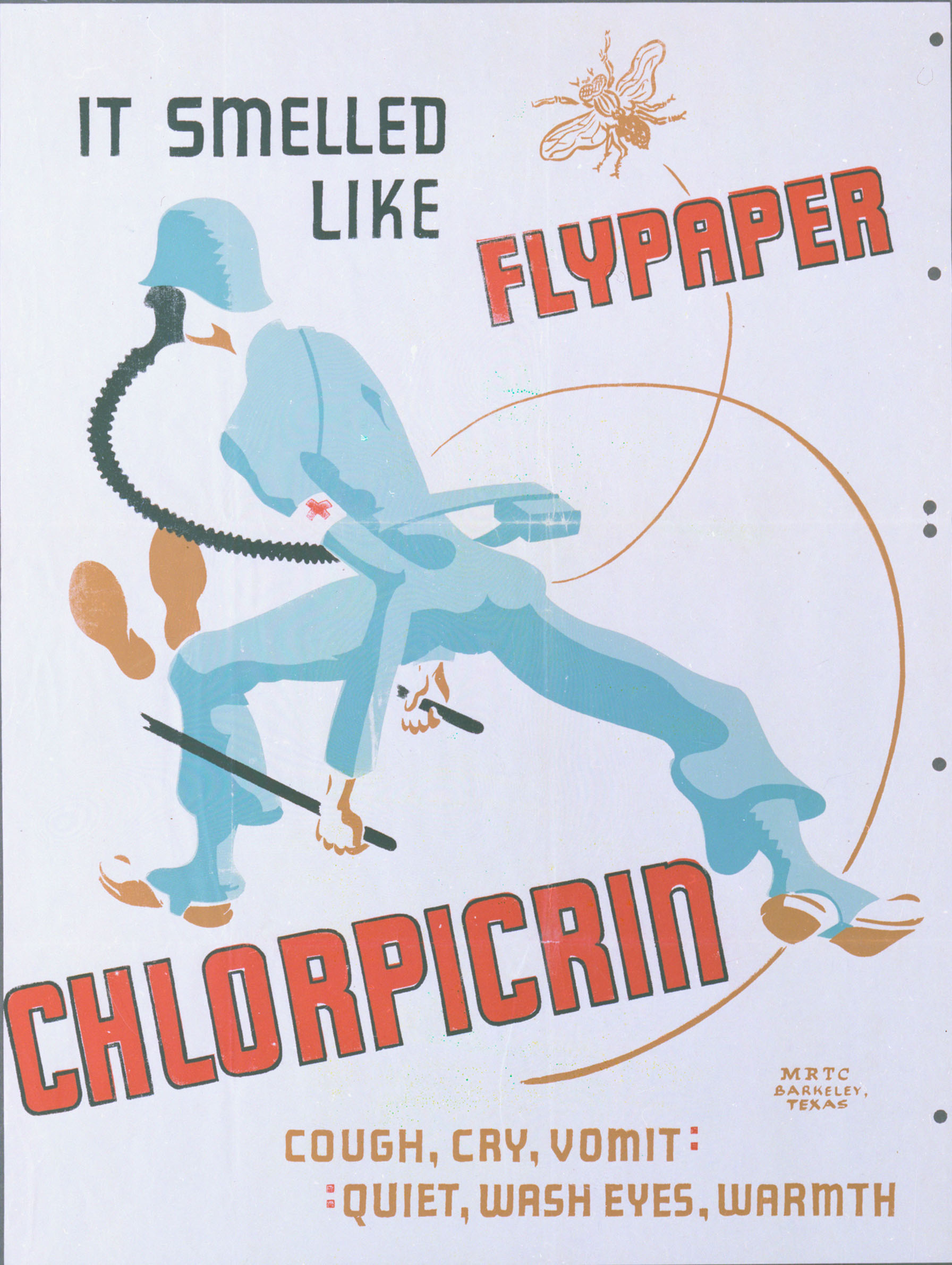
Gas identification art for chloropicrin

Chloropicrin is harmful to humans. It can be absorbed systemically through inhalation, ingestion, and the skin. At high concentrations, it is severely irritating to the lungs, eyes, and skin.

== Damage to protective gear ==
Chloropicrin and its derivative phosgene oxime have been known to damage or compromise earlier generations of personal protective equipment. Some of the soldiers attacked mentioned a white smoke emerging from their gas masks.

== See also ==
- Trichloronitrosomethane
- Tetrachlorodinitroethane
