= Formamide =

CH3NO, simplest amide

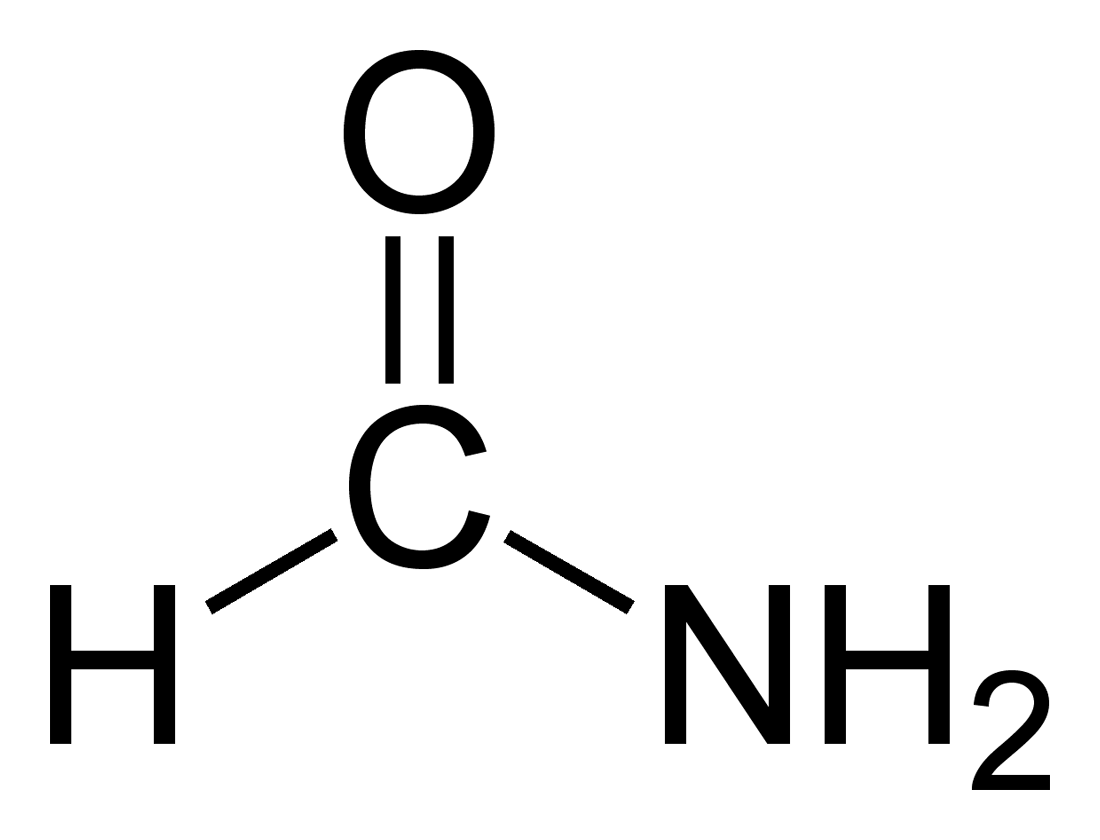
- Structural formula of the formamide molecule

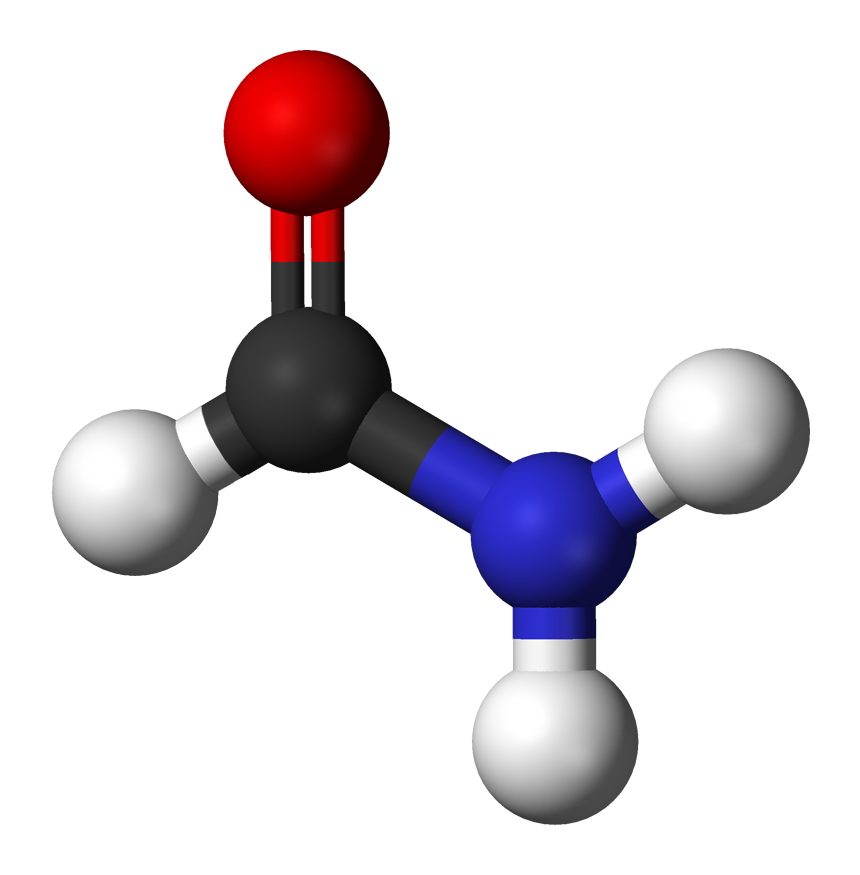
Ball and stick model of formamide
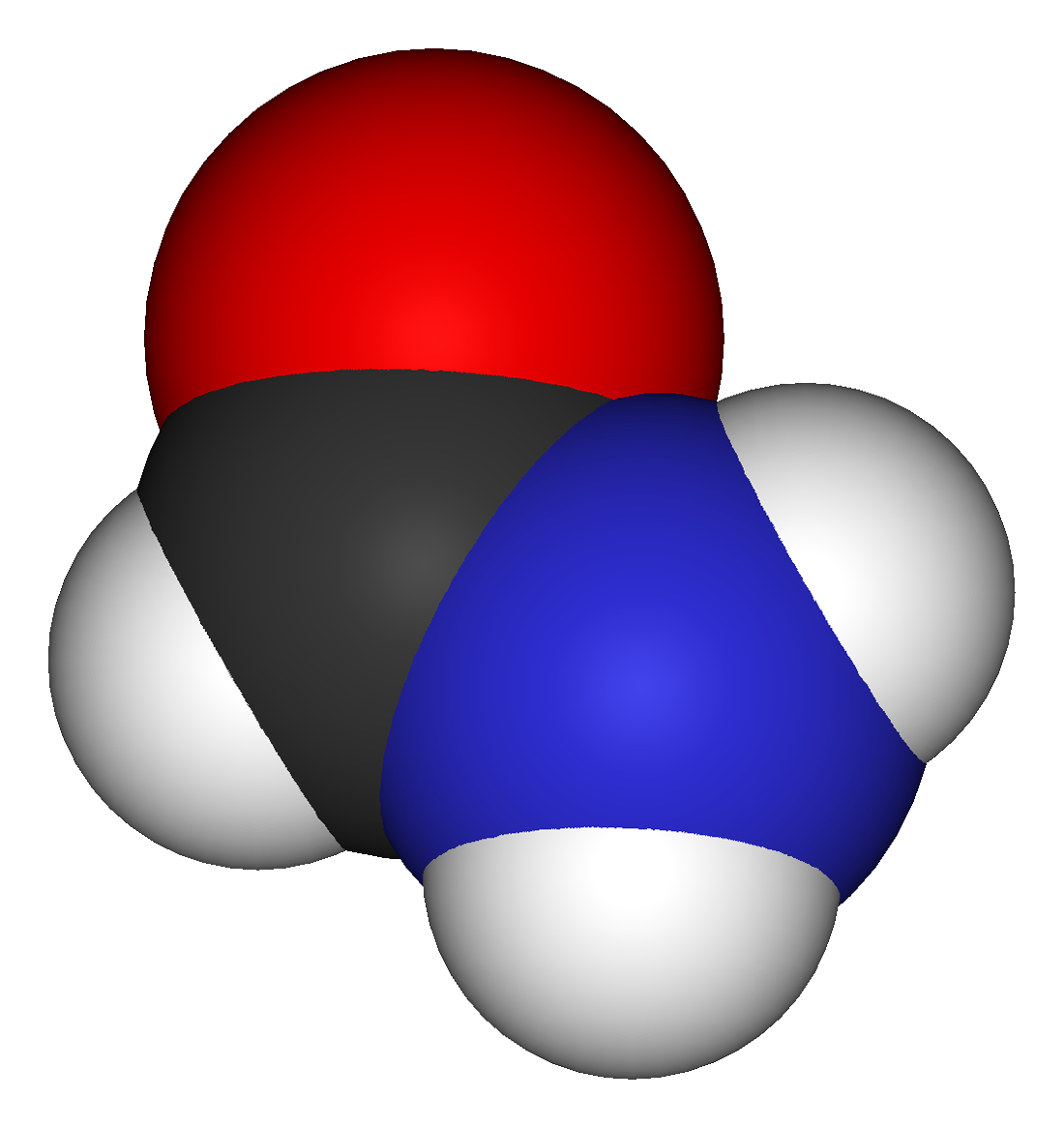
Space-filling model of the formamide molecule

Names
- Preferred IUPAC name Formamide
- Systematic IUPAC name Methanamide
- Other names Carbamaldehyde

Identifiers
| CAS Number | 75-12-7 |
| 3D model (JSmol) | Interactive image |
| ChEBI | CHEBI:48431 |
| ChEMBL | ChEMBL266160 |
| ChemSpider | 693 |
| ECHA InfoCard | 100.000.766 |
| EC Number | 200-842-0 |
| IUPHAR/BPS | 4739 |
| KEGG | C00488 |
| PubChem CID | 713 |
| UNII | 4781T907ZS |
| CompTox Dashboard (EPA) | DTXSID8025337 |
- InChI: InChI=1S/CH3NO/c2-1-3/h1H,(H2,2,3) Key: ZHNUHDYFZUAESO-UHFFFAOYSA-N; InChI=1/CH3NO/c2-1-3/h1H,(H2,2,3) Key: ZHNUHDYFZUAESO-UHFFFAOYAQ
- SMILES: O=CN

Properties
| Chemical formula | CH_{3}NO |
| Molar mass | 45.041 g·mol^{−1} |
| Appearance | Colorless, oily liquid |
| Density | 1.133 g/cm^{3} |
| Melting point | 2 to 3 °C (36 to 37 °F; 275 to 276 K) |
| Boiling point | 210 °C (410 °F; 483 K) |
| Solubility in water | Miscible |
| Vapor pressure | 0.08 mmHg at 20 °C |
| Acidity (pK_{a}) | 23.5 (in DMSO) |
| Magnetic susceptibility (χ) | −2.19×10^{−5} cm^{3}/mol |

Hazards
| NFPA 704 (fire diamond) | 2 1 0 |
| Flash point | 154 °C (309 °F; 427 K) (closed cup) |
- NIOSH (US health exposure limits)
| PEL (Permissible) | none |
| REL (Recommended) | TWA 10 ppm (15 mg/m^{3}) [skin] |
| IDLH (Immediate danger) | N.D. |

Related compounds
| Related compounds | Carbamic acid Dimethylformamide; Formaldoxime |
- Except where otherwise noted, data are given for materials in their standard state (at 25 °C [77 °F], 100 kPa). verify (what is ?) Infobox references

Formamide is an amide derived from formic acid. It is a colorless liquid which is miscible with water and has an ammonia-like odor. It is chemical feedstock for the manufacture of sulfa drugs and other pharmaceuticals, herbicides and pesticides, and in the manufacture of hydrocyanic acid. It has been used as a softener for paper and fiber. It is a solvent for many ionic compounds. It has also been used as a solvent for resins and plasticizers. Some astrobiologists suggest that it may be an alternative to water as the main solvent in other forms of life.

Formamides are compounds of the type RR′NCHO. One important formamide is dimethylformamide, (CH_{3})_{2}NCHO.

== Production ==
=== Historical production ===
In the past, formamide was produced by treating formic acid with ammonia, which produces ammonium formate, which in turn yields formamide upon heating:

HCOOH + NH_{3} → HCOO^{−}[NH_{4}]^{+}
HCOO^{−}[NH_{4}]^{+} → HCONH_{2} + H_{2}O

Formamide is also generated by aminolysis of ethyl formate:

HCOOCH_{2}CH_{3} + NH_{3} → HCONH_{2} + CH_{3}CH_{2}OH

=== Modern production ===
The current industrial process for the manufacture of formamide involves the carbonylation of ammonia:

CO + NH_{3} → HCONH_{2}

An alternative two-stage process involves the ammonolysis of methyl formate, which is formed from carbon monoxide and methanol:

CO + CH_{3}OH → HCOOCH_{3}
HCO_{2}CH_{3} + NH_{3} → HCONH_{2} + CH_{3}OH

== Applications ==
Formamide is used in the industrial production of hydrogen cyanide. It is also used as a solvent for processing various polymers such as polyacrylonitrile.

It is also known that formamide is an excellent swelling agent for cellulosic fibres, and is used in some specific wood-related applications.

=== Reactions ===
Formamide decomposes into carbon monoxide and ammonia when heated above 100 °C.

HCONH_{2} → CO + NH_{3}

The reaction is slow below 160 °C, but accelerates thereafter. At very high temperatures, the reaction products shift to hydrogen cyanide (HCN) and water instead:

HC(O)NH_{2} → HCN + H_{2}O

The same effect occurs in the presence of solid acid catalysts. Contrariwise, heating potassium formamidate gives hydrogen gas and potassium cyanate.

=== Niche or laboratory applications ===
Formamide is a constituent of cryoprotectant vitrification mixtures used for cryopreservation of tissues and organs.

Formamide is also used as an RNA stabiliser in gel electrophoresis by deionizing RNA. In capillary electrophoresis, it is used for stabilizing (single) strands of denatured DNA.

Another use is to add it in sol-gel solutions in order to avoid cracking during sintering.

Formamide, in its pure state, has been used as an alternative solvent for the electrostatic self-assembly of polymer nanofilms.

Formamide is used to prepare primary amines directly from ketones via their N-formyl derivatives, using the Leuckart reaction.

== Biochemistry ==
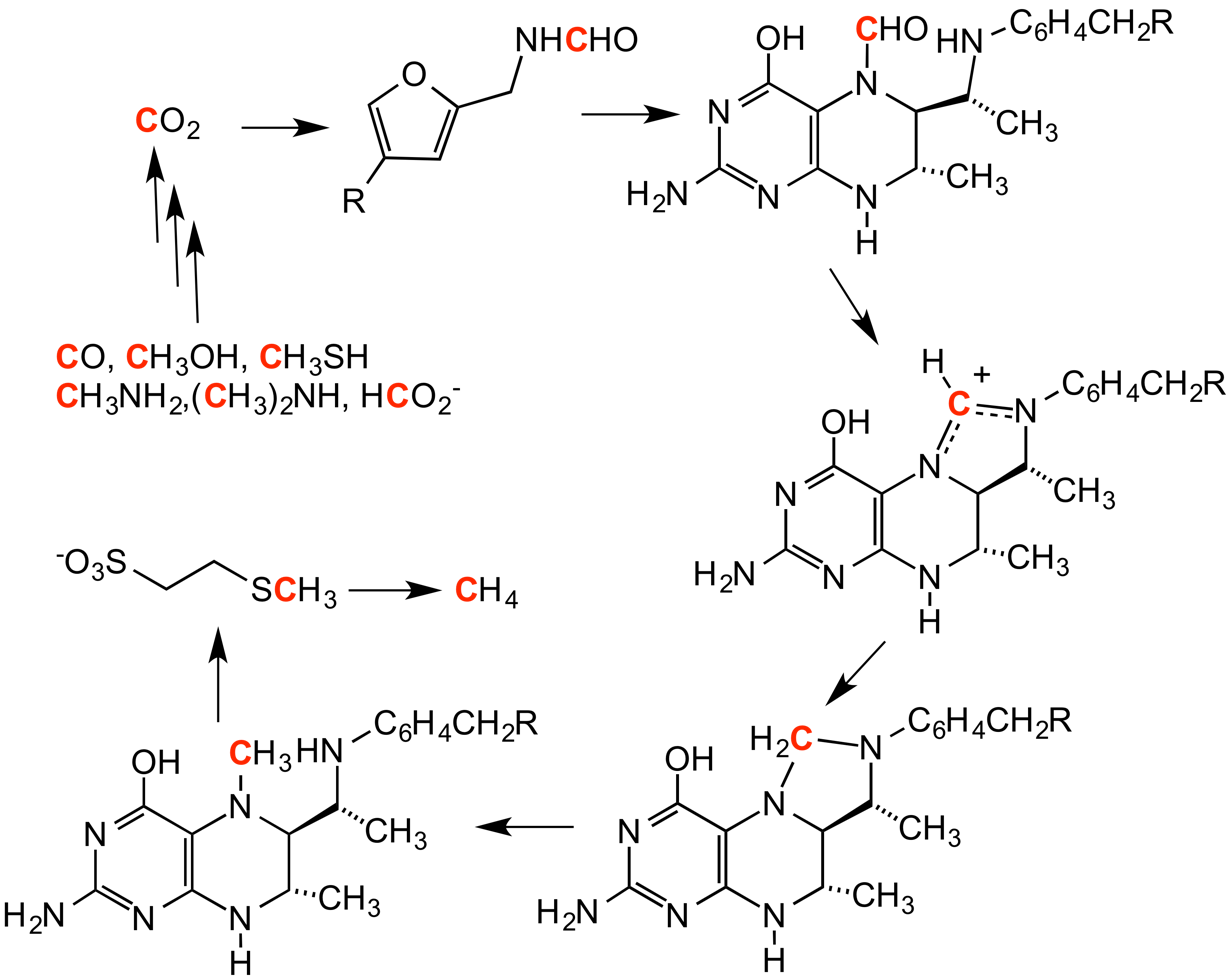
Cycle for methanogenesis, showing two formamide-containing intermediates.

Formamides are intermediates in the methanogenesis cycle.

=== Prebiotic chemistry ===
Formamide has been proposed as an alternative solvent to water, perhaps with the ability to support life with alternative biochemistries to that currently found on Earth. It forms by the hydrolysis of hydrogen cyanide. With a large dipole moment, its solvation properties are similar to those of water.

Formamide has been shown to convert to traces of guanine upon heating in the presence of ultraviolet light.

Several prebiotic chemical reactions producing amino acid derivatives have been shown to take place in formamide. Similar scenarios implicate thioformamide.

== Safety ==
Contact with skin and eyes is not recommended. With an LD50 of grams per kg, formamide is of low acute toxicity. It also has low mutagenicity.

Formamide is classified as toxic to reproductive health.
