= Trichloronitrosomethane =

Names
- Other names TL-358

Identifiers
CAS Number	3711-49-7
3D model (JSmol)	Interactive image
ChemSpider	69724
PubChem CID	77305
CompTox Dashboard (EPA)	DTXSID80190610
- InChI: InChI=1S/CCl3NO/c2-1(3,4)5-6 Key: WXWITNRAXGTELB-UHFFFAOYSA-N
- SMILES: C(N=O)(Cl)(Cl)Cl

Properties
Chemical formula	CCl_{3}NO
Molar mass	148.37 g·mol^{−1}
Appearance	Deep blue liquid
- Except where otherwise noted, data are given for materials in their standard state (at 25 °C [77 °F], 100 kPa). Infobox references

Trichloronitrosomethane is a chlorinated nitrosoalkane. It is a deep blue liquid with powerful lachrymatory effects.

== Synthesis ==
Trichloronitrosomethane can be produced with following methods:

- Oxidation of trichloromethylsulfinic acid with nitric acid.
- Reaction of sodium trichloromethylsulfinate with sodium nitrite and sodium nitrate or potassium nitrate in sulfuric acid.
- Pyrolysis of trichloroacetoxamic acid.

== Chemistry ==
Trichloronitrosomethane is an unstable substance. It slowly decomposes into nitrosyl chloride, nitrogen oxides, and chloropicrin over time.

Trichloronitrosomethane can be reduced to phosgene oxime by hydrogen sulfide.

== See also ==
- Chloropicrin
- Trifluoronitrosomethane
- Phosgene oxime
