= Formaldoxime =

Names
- Preferred IUPAC name N-Hydroxymethanimine

Identifiers
CAS Number	75-17-2
3D model (JSmol)	Interactive image
ChemSpider	6110
ECHA InfoCard	100.000.769
EC Number	200-845-7
PubChem CID	6350
UNII	420JFM0Z1Q
CompTox Dashboard (EPA)	DTXSID9058785
- InChI: InChI=1S/CH3NO/c1-2-3/h3H,1H2 Key: SQDFHQJTAWCFIB-UHFFFAOYSA-N
- SMILES: C=NO

Properties
Chemical formula	H_{2}C=N−OH
Molar mass	45.041 g·mol^{−1}
Appearance	colorless liquid
Melting point	2.5 °C (36.5 °F; 275.6 K)
Boiling point	84 °C (183 °F; 357 K)

Hazards
- GHS labelling
Pictograms	(GHS07: Exclamation mark)
Signal word	Warning

Related compounds
Related compounds	Phosgene oxime; Formaldehyde; Oxime; Imine
- Except where otherwise noted, data are given for materials in their standard state (at 25 °C [77 °F], 100 kPa). Infobox references

Formaldoxime is the organic compound with the formula H_{2}C=N−OH. It is the oxime of formaldehyde. A colorless liquid, the pure compound tends to polymerize into a cyclic trimer. Aqueous solutions are stable as is the formaldoxime hydrochloride ([H_{2}C=N(−H)(−OH)]^{+}Cl^{−}). It is a reagent in organic synthesis for the conversion of aryl diazonium salts to aryl aldehydes. It is an isomer of formamide.

It is generated by combining hydroxylamine and formaldehyde.

== Synonyms ==
- Formoxime
- Nitrone
- Formaldehyde oxime
- Formaldoxim
- Methylene nitrone - a tautomer with hydrogen connected to the nitrogen atom.
