= Trifluoronitrosomethane =

Toxic gaseous compound

Skeletal formula of trifluoronitrosomethane
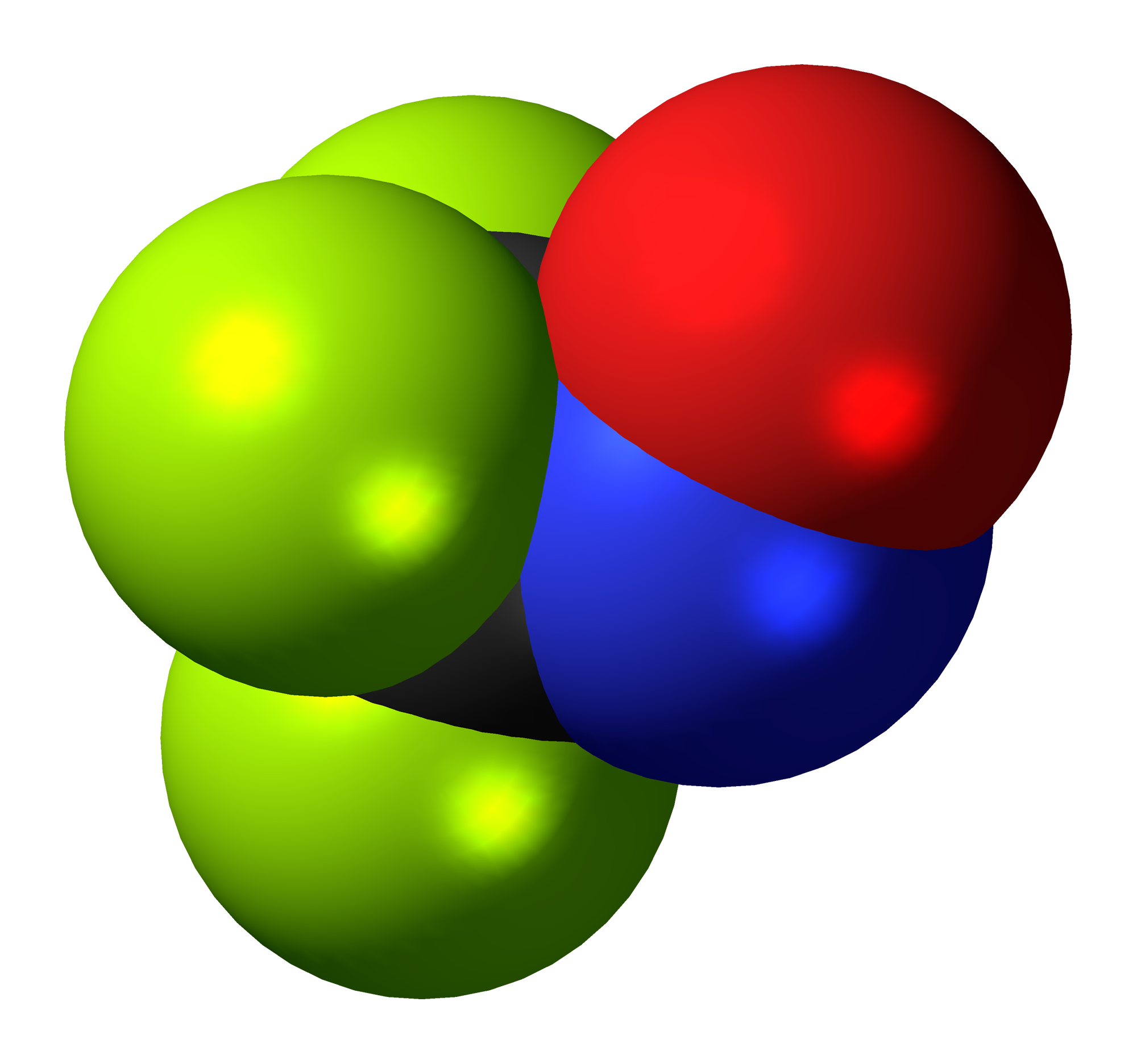
Space-filling model of trifluoronitrosomethane
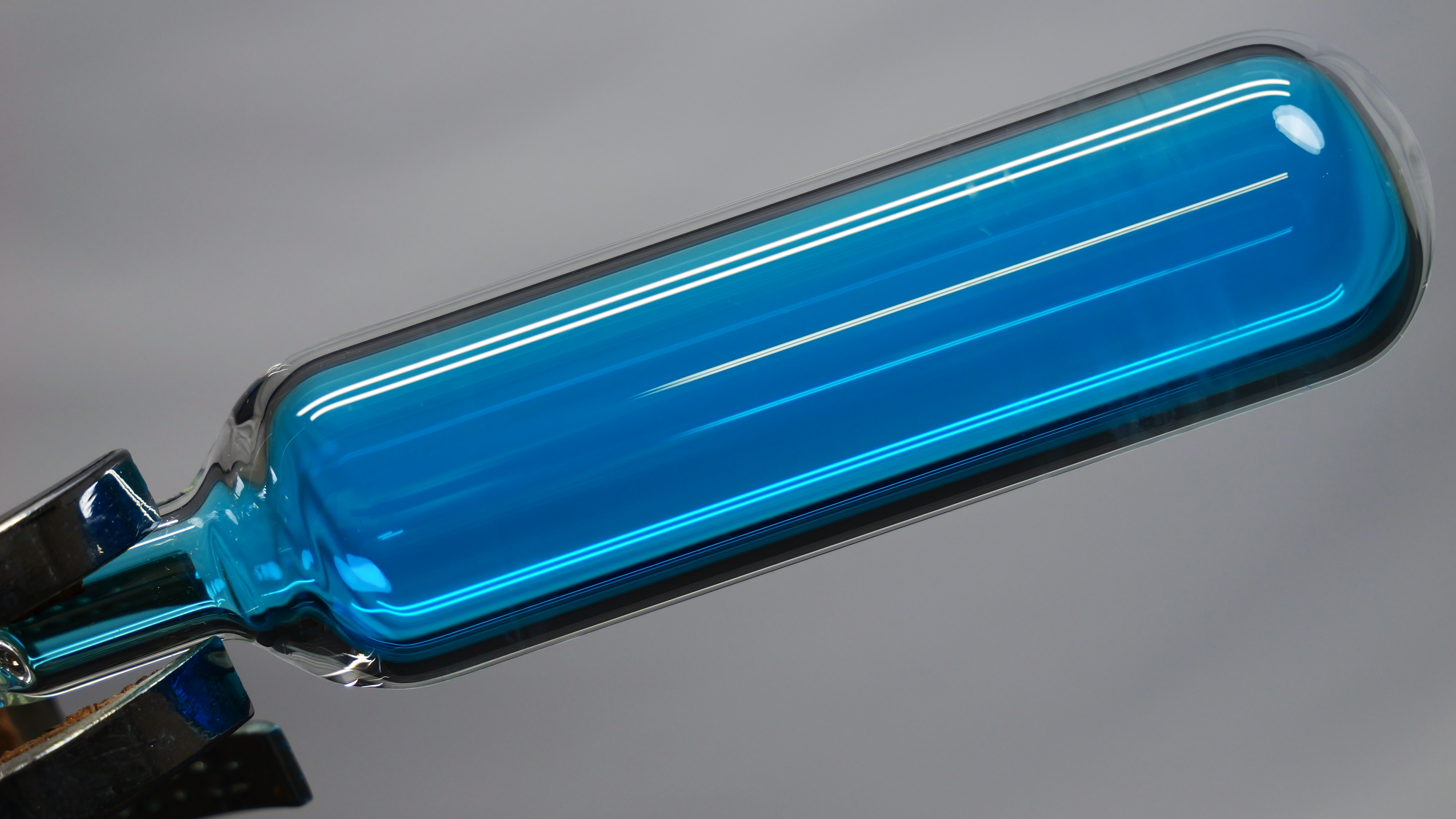

Names
- Preferred IUPAC name Trifluoro(nitroso)methane
- Other names: Trifluoro-nitrosomethane; Trifluoro-nitroso-methane; Nitrosotrifluoromethane

Identifiers
CAS Number	334-99-6
3D model (JSmol)	Interactive image
Abbreviations	TFNM
ChemSpider	60949
ECHA InfoCard	100.005.804
EC Number	206-383-2
PubChem CID	67630
UNII	M9H4YRQ7XZ
CompTox Dashboard (EPA)	DTXSID3073896
- InChI: InChI=1S/CF3NO/c2-1(3,4)5-6 Key: PGOMVYSURVZIIW-UHFFFAOYSA-N
- SMILES: O=NC(F)(F)F

Properties
Chemical formula	CF_{3}NO
Molar mass	99.012 g·mol^{−1}
Appearance	Blue to deep-blue gas Blue-green solid
Melting point	−196.6 °C (−321.9 °F; 76.5 K)
Boiling point	−85 °C (−121 °F; 188 K)

Hazards
- Occupational safety and health (OHS/OSH)
Main hazards	Toxic
NFPA 704 (fire diamond)	3 1 0
- Except where otherwise noted, data are given for materials in their standard state (at 25 °C [77 °F], 100 kPa). Infobox references

Trifluoronitrosomethane (commonly abbreviated as TFNM) is a toxic and unstable gaseous compound consisting of a trifluoromethyl group covalently bound to a nitroso group. The gas is notable for its intense blue colour.

== Properties ==
Although it is somewhat more kinetically stable than expected due to its fluorine substituents, trifluoronitrosomethane, like other nitroso compounds, has a C–N bond that is weaker than normal. The bond enthalpy of the C–N bond is only 167 kJ/mol (39.9 kcal/mol).

== Production ==
Trifluoronitrosomethane can be produced from the reaction of trifluoroiodomethane and nitric oxide under a UV light with a yield of up to 90%. A significant amount of mercury metal is needed to quench the iodine and nitrogen dioxide gases produced during the reaction.

Pyrolysis of trifluoroacetyl nitrite gives trifluoronitrosomethane with yields over 85%. Carbon dioxide is formed as a side product. This method may also be employed to make other perfluoronitrosoalkanes from the corresponding perfluorocarboxylic acids.

CF_{3}C(O)ONO → CF_{3}NO + CO_{2}

== History ==
Trifluoronitrosomethane was synthesised for the first time in 1936 by Otto Ruff and Manfred Giese at the Schlesische Friedrich-Wilhelms-Universität zu Breslau. It was formed through a reaction involving the fluorination of silver cyanide in the presence of silver nitrate and silver oxide.

Copolymers of this nitroso compound with tetrafluoroethylene have the formula [OC_{2}F_{4}N(CF_{3})-]_{n}. These materials once attracted interest as fire-resistant elastomers.

== See also ==
- Hexafluorothioacetone
- Trichloronitrosomethane
